= List of monitors of the United States Navy =

Ships of the United States Navy

Ships in current service
- Current ships

Ships grouped alphabetically
- A–B; C; D–F; G–H; I–K; L; M; N–O; P; Q–R; S; T–V; W–Z

Ships grouped by type
- Aircraft carriers; Airships; Amphibious warfare ships; Auxiliaries; Battlecruisers; Battleships; Cruisers; Destroyers; Destroyer escorts; Destroyer leaders; Escort carriers; Frigates; Hospital ships; Littoral combat ships; Mine warfare vessels; Monitors; Oilers; Patrol vessels; Registered civilian vessels; Sailing frigates; Steam frigates; Steam gunboats; Ships of the line; Sloops of war; Submarines; Torpedo boats; Torpedo retrievers; Unclassified miscellaneous; Yard and district craft

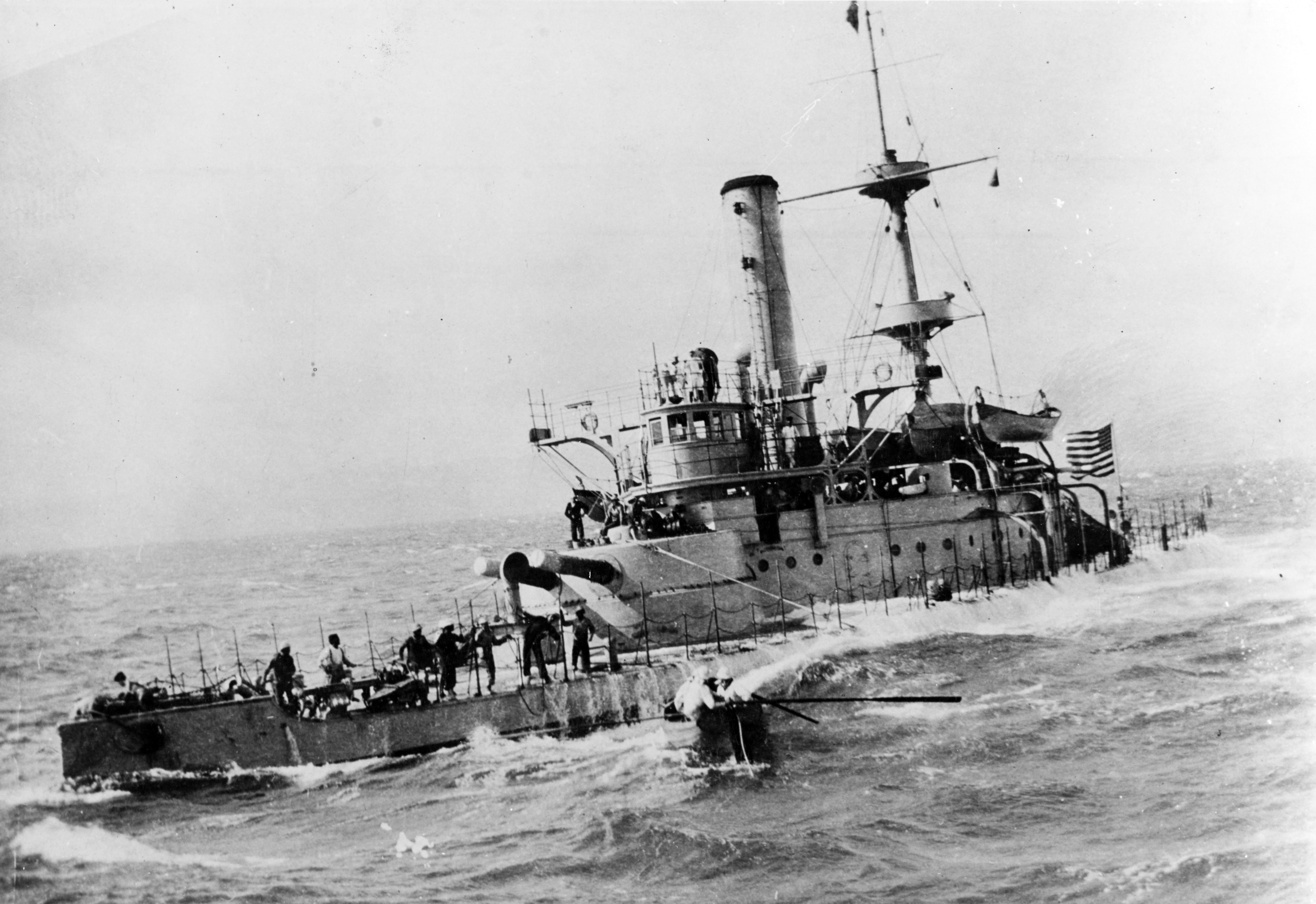
USS Monadnock (BM-3) crossing the Pacific Ocean in 1898; note how the ship is swamped due to the low-freeboard typical of monitors

This is a list of all monitors of the United States Navy. While the most famous name is represented in this list, many monitors held multiple names during their service life. View the complete list of names.

== Historical overview ==
The whole category of monitors took its name from the first of these, USS Monitor, designed in 1861 by John Ericsson. They were low-freeboard, steam-powered ironclad vessels, with one or two rotating armored turrets, rather than the traditional broadside of guns. The low freeboard meant that these ships were unsuitable for ocean-going duties and were always at risk of swamping and possible loss, but it reduced the amount of armor required for protection.

They were succeeded by more seaworthy armored cruisers and battleships.

== River monitors ==
Ozark class

- Ozark

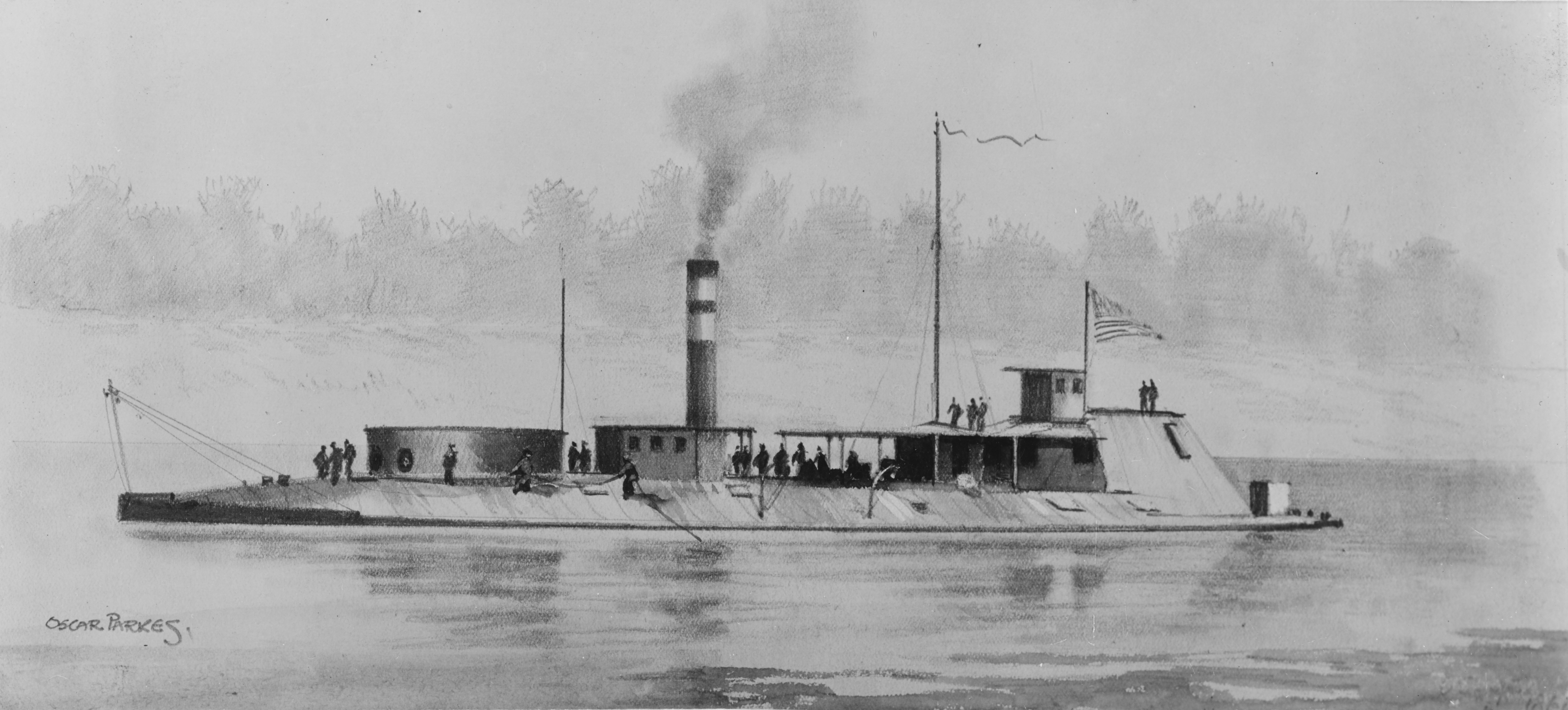
The river monitor Neosho.

Neosho class

- Neosho
- Osage, sunk by mine, 29 March 1865, 2 killed

Marietta class

- Marietta
- Sandusky

== Harbor monitors ==
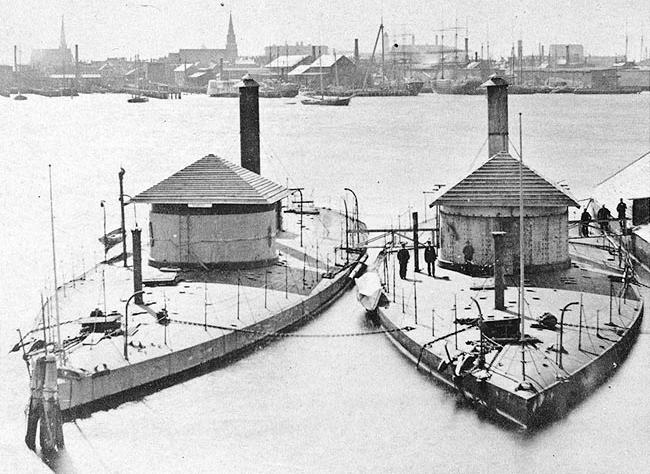
Casco-class monitors Shawnee and Wassuc.

Roanoke class

- Roanoke

Casco class

- Casco
- Chimo
- Cohoes
- Etlah
- Klamath
- Koka
- Modoc
- Napa
- Naubuc
- Nausett
- Shawnee
- Shiloh
- Squando
- Suncook
- Tunxis
- Umpqua
- Wassuc
- Waxsaw
- Yazoo
- Yuma

== Coastal monitors ==
The Monitor, prototype for an entire class of warship.

Monitor class

- Monitor, foundered 31 December 1862, 16 killed

Passaic class

- Passaic
- Montauk
- Nahant
- Patapsco, sunk by mine on 15 January 1865, 75 killed
- Weehawken, sunk at anchor, 6 December 1863, 31 killed
- Sangamon
- Catskill
- Nantucket
- Lehigh
- Camanche

Canonicus class

- Canonicus
- Saugus
- Tecumseh, sunk by mine, 5 August 1864, 94 killed
- Manhattan
- Mahopac
- Wyandotte
- Ajax
- Catawba, later BAP Atahualpa
- Oneota, later BAP Manco Cápac

Milwaukee class

- Milwaukee, sunk by mine, 28 March 1865, no fatalities
- Winnebago
- Chickasaw
- Kickapoo

== Seagoing monitors ==
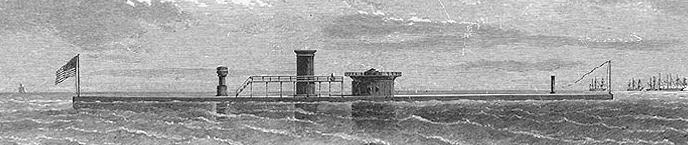
The original Puritan.

- Dictator
- Onondaga
- Puritan

Miantonomoh class

- Miantonomoh
- Monadnock
- Agamenticus
- Tonawanda

Kalamazoo class

- Kalamazoo
- Passaconaway
- Quinsigamond
- Shakamaxon

== "New Navy" monitors ==
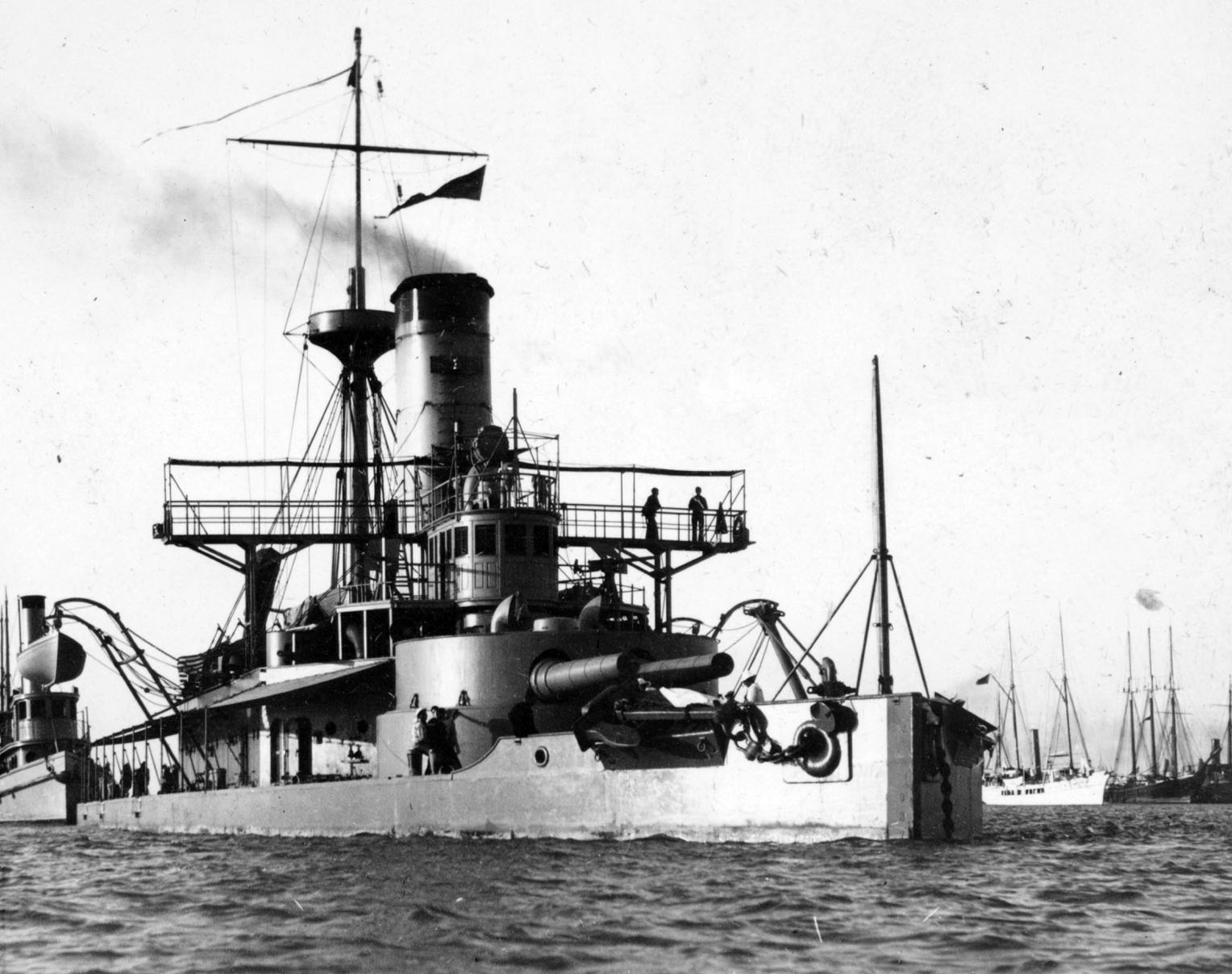
The "refit" Puritan.

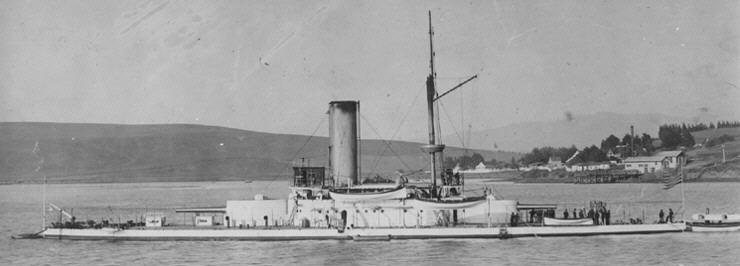
USS Monterey

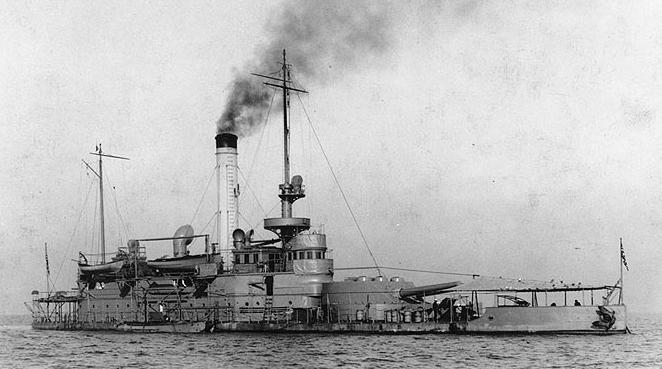
USS Wyoming

The first five of these were ostensibly rebuilds of Civil War era monitors (in much the same way that the 1854 sloop-of-war Constellation was ostensibly a refit of the 1797 sail frigate Constellation). In fact, they were entirely new ships, much larger and more capable than the previous ones. Dates listed are the first commissioning dates.

Puritan class

- (BM-1) Puritan (1896) Spanish–American War

Amphitrite class

- (BM-2) Amphitrite (1895) Spanish–American War, WW1
- (BM-3) Monadnock (1896) Spanish–American War, Boxer Rebellion, WW1
- (BM-4) Terror (1896) Spanish–American War
- (BM-5) Miantonomoh (1882) Spanish–American War

Monterey class

- (BM-6) Monterey (1893) Spanish–American War

Arkansas class

- (M-7/BM-7) Arkansas (1902) later Ozark, WW1
- (M-8/BM-8) Nevada (1903) ex-Connecticut, later Tonopah, WW1
- (M-9/BM-9) Florida (1903) later Tallahassee, WW1, later IX-16
- (M-10/BM-10) Wyoming (1902) Panama independence, later Cheyenne, WW1, later IX-4

== Vietnam War "brown-water navy" monitors ==
The US Navy created their first Mobile Riverine Force (MRF) for the first time since the American Civil War, during the Vietnam War. World War II all steel 56-foot (17 m)-long Landing Craft Mechanized (LCM-6s) were used as the basic hull to convert into 24 Monitors from 1966-1970. This was a separate US Navy Mobile Riverine Force from the Swift Boats (PCFs) and PBRs already operating in country. The twenty-four river Monitors were divided into two groups: Program 4 & 5. Ten Program 4 Monitors arrived first in Vietnam, and were armed with one 40mm cannon mounted inside a revolving Mk 52 turret; while the 8 later arriving Program 5 versions (designated Monitor "H") mounted one M49 105mm Howitzer inside a revolving T172 turret. Due to a shortage of M49 howitzers, the USN converted the remaining six Program 5 Monitors (designated Monitor "F") to Flamethrower Monitors, and equipped them with an M10-8 flamethrower mounted inside an M8 cupola turret. The early Program 4 Monitors had hull numbers reflecting their River Assault Division (RAD) as well as their hull number. Later, simply the hull numbers were used, such as M-1 (Monitor 1), A-1 (Alpha Boat 1), C-1 (Command/Communications/Control 1), etc.

=== River Assault Flotilla One Program 4 monitors (40mm cannon) ===
- RAD 91
  - M-91-1
  - M-91-2
  - M-91-3
  - Command Monitor (CCB-Command Communications Boat) C-91-1
- RAD 92
  - M-92-1
  - M-92-2
  - C-92-1
- RAD 111
  - M-111-1
  - M-111-2
  - M-111-3
  - C-111-1
- RAD 112
  - M-112-1
  - M-112-2
  - C-112-1

=== River Assault Flotilla One Program 5 monitors (105mm howitzer or flamethrower) ===
- M-1, M-2, M-3, M-4, M-5, M-6, M-7, and M-8
- Z-1 to Z-6.

== Similar vessels of interest ==
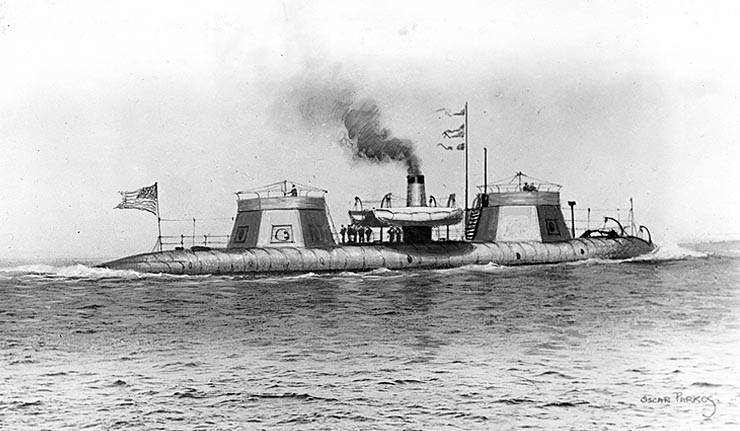
The Keokuk.

- Keokuk, an experimental ironclad steamer with composite armor and two armored three-gun towers, fought in one battle, sunk by artillery 8 April 1863, 1 killed
- Spuyten Duyvil, an innovative semi-submersible spar torpedo boat, effectively employed in the Civil War.
- Katahdin, an ironclad harbor defense ram.

== See also ==
- List of monitors of the Royal Navy
