= Amphitrite-class monitor =

Monitor class of the United States Navy

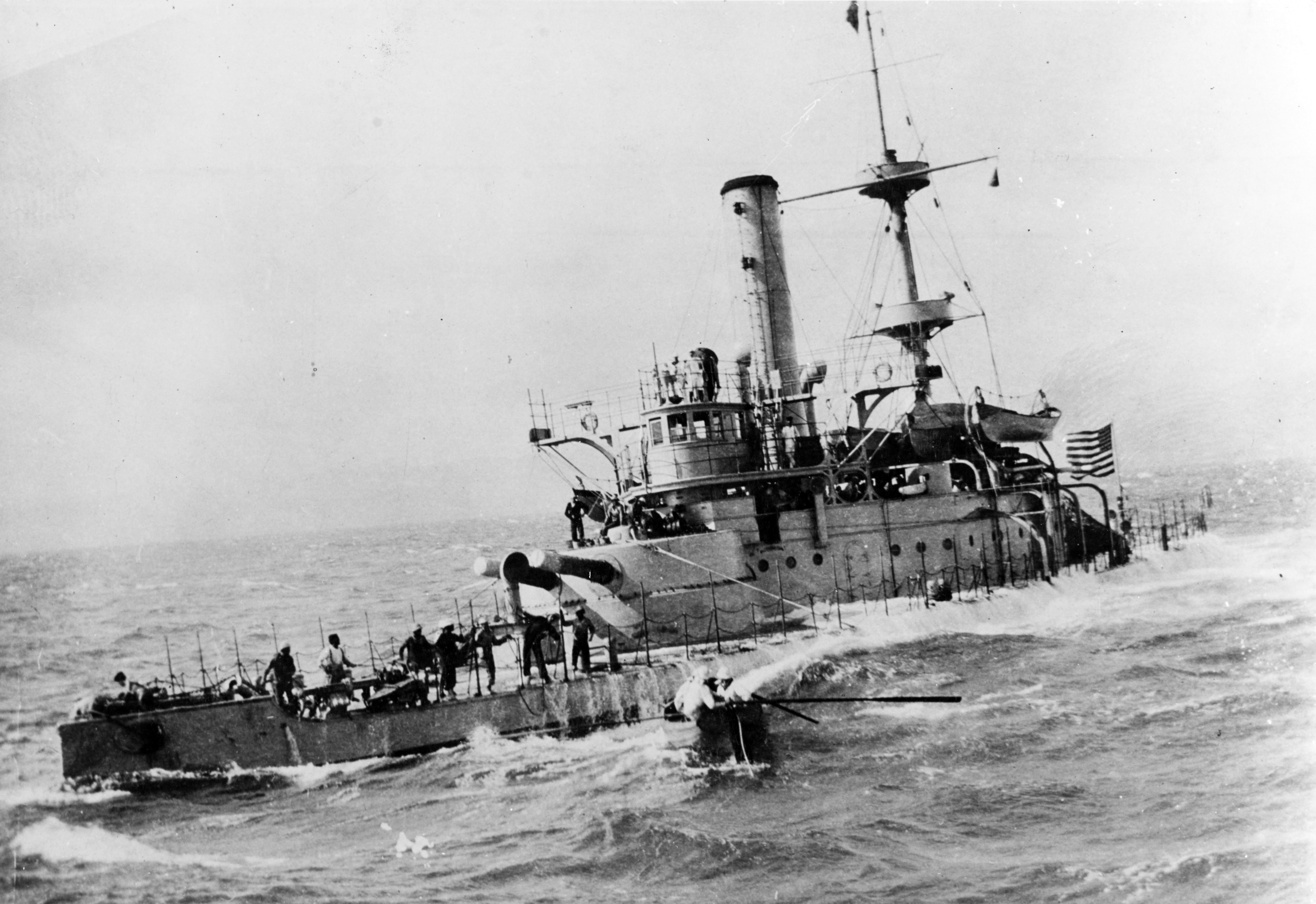
- USS Monadnock, a monitor of the Amphitrite class, crossing the Pacific Ocean during the Spanish–American War.

Class overview
- Builders: Continental Iron Works (Greenpoint, NY); Harlan & Hollingsworth; John Roach & Sons; Phineas Burgess; William Cramp & Sons
- Operators: United States Navy
- Succeeded by: Puritan class
- In commission: 1891–1919
- Planned: 5
- Completed: 4
- Scrapped: 4

General characteristics
- Type: Monitor
- Displacement: 3,990 long tons (4,050 t) (designed)
- Length: 262 ft (80 m) oa; 259 ft (79 m) lwl
- Beam: 55 ft 6 in (16.92 m)
- Draft: 14 ft 6 in (4.42 m)
- Installed power: 4 × single-ended steam boilers; 1,426 ihp (1,063 kW) (produced on trials)
- Propulsion: 2 × Triple expansion (Monadnock); 2 × Compound (Others)
- Speed: 12 kn (22 km/h; 14 mph) (designed); Monadnock: 11.5 kn (21.3 km/h; 13.2 mph); Others: 10.5 kn (19.4 km/h; 12.1 mph)
- Range: 1,370 nmi (2,540 km; 1,580 mi) @ 10 knots (19 km/h; 12 mph)
- Complement: 19 officers and 164 enlisted
- Armament: 4 × 10 in (250 mm)/30 caliber guns; 4 × 6-pounder 57 mm (2.2 in) guns; 2 × 3-pounder guns; Various smaller
- Armor: Iron armor; Belt: 7–5 in (180–130 mm); Deck: 1.75 in (44 mm); Turrets: 11.5 in (290 mm)

The Amphitrite-class monitors were a class of four U.S. Navy monitors ordered in the aftermath of the Virginius affair with Spain in 1873. The four ships of the class included Amphitrite, Monadnock, Terror, and Miantonomoh. A fifth ship originally of the same design, Puritan, was later fitted with extra armor and designated as a unique class.

Puritan and the Amphitrite class were to remain under construction for an extraordinarily long period due both to design changes and to the reluctance of the US Congress to appropriate funds for their completion. Most of the vessels were only commissioned in the mid-1890s—more than twenty years after the commencement of construction. They were eventually to see active service in the Spanish–American War.

== Virginius affair ==
On 1 October 1873, the American-flagged merchant ship Virginius was intercepted by the Spanish Navy on suspicion of supplying provisions and personnel to a Cuban insurgency. A few days later, 53 crew and passengers of Virginius were summarily executed by the Spanish, including several Americans and Britons, creating a serious diplomatic crisis. While war was apparently imminent, a Spanish ironclad was coincidentally berthed in New York Harbor, drawing attention to the fact that the U.S. Navy had not a single ironclad in serviceable condition for the defence of America's ports.

== Design ==
The Amphitrite-class monitors were designed with a displacement of 3,990 long tons (4,050 t) but at trials Miantonomoh only had a displacement of 3,815 long tons (3,876 t). They had an overall length of 262 ft (80 m) and a length at the waterline of 259 ft (79 m). They measured 55 ft 6 in (16.92 m) at the beam with a 14 ft 6 in (4.42 m) draft. They were manned by a total crew of 19 officers and 164 enlisted men.

The Amphitrites were powered by compound steam engines, except Monadnock, which used triple expansion engines, that drove two screw propellers. Steam was generated by four single-ended steam boilers that were designed to generated 1,600 ihp (1,200 kW) with a top speed of 12 kn (22 km/h; 14 mph), but on trials Miantonomoh only produced 1,425 ihp (1,063 kW) with a top speed of 10.5 kn (19.4 km/h; 12.1 mph).

The ships were armed with main battery of four 10 in (250 mm)/30 caliber guns, with 10-inch/31 caliber, later modified to 10-inch/35 caliber, guns being used on Miantonomoh. The secondary battery consisted of four 6-pounder 57 mm (2.2 in) guns. The main belt armor was 7 in (180 mm) in the middle tapering to 5 in (130 mm) at the ends. The gun turrets were 11.5 in (290 mm). The Amphitrite's also had a 1.75 in (44 mm) deck.

== Construction ==
In the years following the American Civil War, the US Congress had allowed the Navy to fall into disrepair as the nation focussed its energies on reconstruction and westward expansion.

=== The Robeson subterfuge ===
Secretary of the Navy George Robeson wasted no time in bringing the Navy's lack of readiness to the attention of Congress, which hastily allocated a million dollars for the overhaul of five of the larger twin-turret Civil-War era monitors—Puritan, Amphitrite, Miantonomoh, Monadnock and Terror. These vessels were in such poor condition however, that Robeson took it upon himself to use the money to build five entirely new monitors instead, under the guise of "repairing" the old ones. In furtherance of this scheme, he gave the new monitors identical names to the old, and authorized the scrapping of the latter to help pay for the new construction.

As the Navy's own shipyards lacked the capability to build ironclads at this time, Robeson approached four private shipyards—Harlan & Hollingsworth, William Cramp & Sons, John Roach & Sons and the Continental Iron Works, and offered them his "repair" contracts for Amphitrite, Terror, Miantonomoh and Puritan respectively. A fifth contract, for Monadnock, was accepted by a New York entrepreneur, Phineas Burgess. Continental Iron Works was the only firm to decline Robeson's offer, and consequently John Roach & Sons accepted the contracts to build both Puritan and Miantonomoh. However, Continental Iron Works would still participate in construction of the monitors through its supply of prefabricated ship parts to Burgess. The terms for each contractor were identical—a set of three contracts which covered respectively the building of the frames, installation of hull plates, and installation of the engines and boilers. The third contract was left unsigned in each case until the first two had been fulfilled.

Since Robeson had been unable to secure funding for new warship construction, he hoped to be able to complete the ships from the Navy's annual repair and maintenance budget, but in the wake of the Virginius incident, the Navy increased the number of its personnel and also conducted a series of Naval demonstrations, all of which reduced available funds. Robeson resorted to cannibalizing many of the old Civil War era ironclads to sell as scrap to the shipbuilders in lieu of cash payments. The Cramp shipyard received four old monitors for scrapping, including Otsego. John Roach & Sons, which had its own iron mill and could directly recycle scrap iron, received the most ironclads for scrapping—the original Miantonomoh and Puritan, in addition to the Casco-class monitors Cohoes, Casco, Chimo, Modoc, Napa, Nausett and Waxsaw. The scrap value of Puritan was estimated at $43,000 and that of the Casco class from $7,000 to $20,000 each. Roach also received several other vessels for scrap including the screw frigate Neshaminy and the screw sloop Severn—fourteen ships in total, including the monitors.

In spite of these ad hoc measures, Robeson soon ran out of money. In 1876, he was forced to ask Congress for an appropriation of $2,300,000 to complete the five new monitors. A few days before leaving office, he decided to sign the third (machinery) contracts for all five vessels, in hope that the incoming administration would honor them. He also awarded a new $997,642 contract to Roach for the fitting of additional armor to Puritan.

=== Cancellation of contracts, 1877 ===
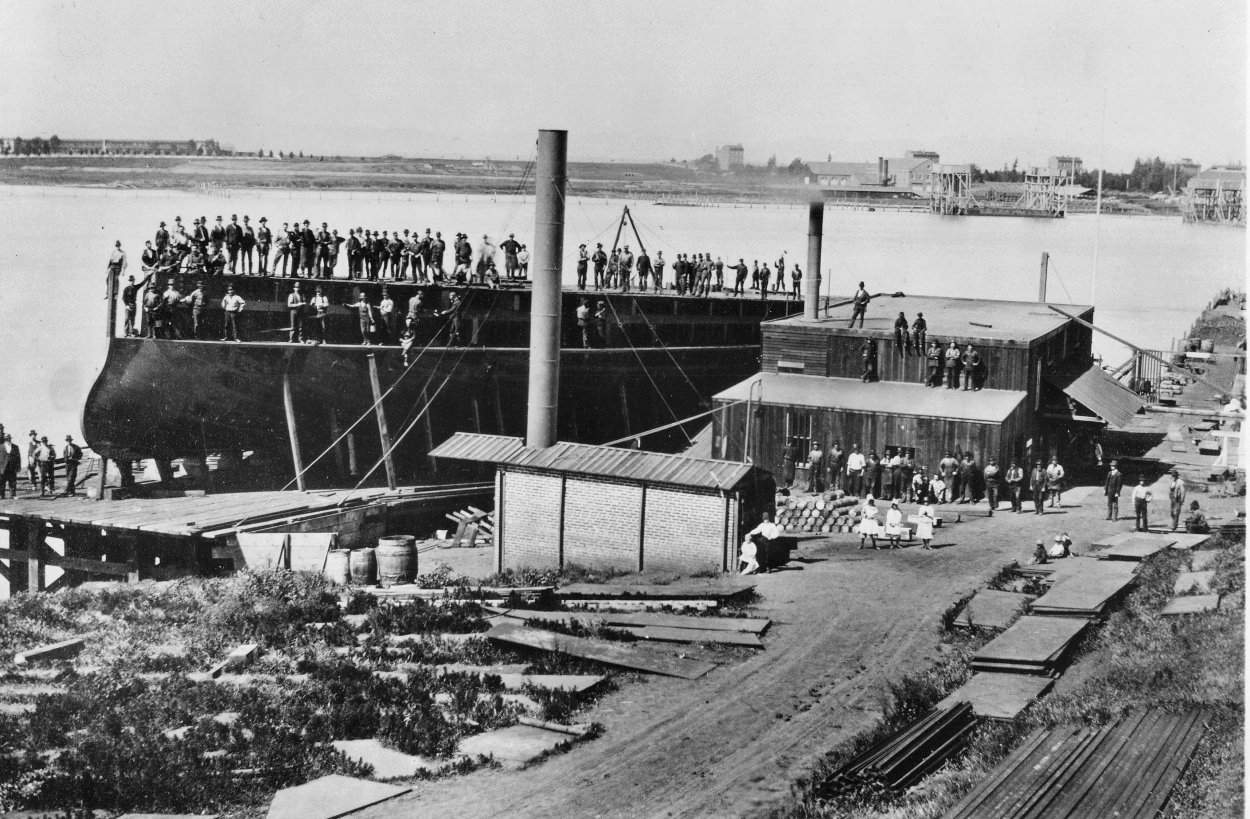
USS Monadnock prior to her launch at the Burgess shipyard, Vallejo, California, 19 September 1883. Monadnock is the only known ship to have been built by Burgess.

When the Hayes administration came to power in 1877, it appointed a new Secretary of the Navy, Richard W. Thompson, to replace Robeson. Thompson was shocked to discover the total indebtedness of the Navy to be in excess of seven million dollars, and he quickly slashed expenditures across the board by fifty percent. Considering the Amphitrite-class contracts signed by Robeson in his last days in office to be illegal, Thompson initiated an independent review. An ad hoc committee confirmed his opinion, and the contracts for all five monitors were cancelled.

The four shipyards which had contracted to build the monitors were now forced to retain the cancelled ships in an unfinished state on their slipways at their own expense, while their debts went unpaid. Roach, for example, was owed in excess of $500,000 by the Navy, the interest alone for which amounted to $30,000 per annum. He was even compelled by the government to retain a watchman, again at his own expense, to guard the unfinished warships. The shipyard of Phineas Burgess, set up in Vallejo, California specifically to build Monadnock, was forced into receivership by the cancellation. Burgess' heirs sued the government for compensation and in 1897 won a settlement of $129,311.45.

=== Reinstatement of contracts, 1880s ===
By the time the Garfield administration assumed office in 1881, the Navy's condition had deteriorated still further. A review conducted on behalf of the new Secretary of the Navy, William H. Hunt, found that of 140 vessels on the Navy's active list, only 52 were in an operational state, of which a mere 17 were iron-hulled ships, including 14 ageing Civil War era ironclads. Hunt recognized the necessity of modernizing the Navy, and set up an informal advisory board to make recommendations.

Following this board's recommendations, Congress in August 1882 tentatively authorized the completion of the Amphitrite-class monitors to the launching stage, including the installation of engines and boilers. It also set up a permanent Naval Advisory Board to make further recommendations. The new Board eventually recommended the construction of several new protected cruisers and a dispatch vessel, as well as the completion of the Amphitrite-class monitors including the extra armor for Puritan. Congress approved these recommendations on 3 March 1883.

=== Naval yard delays, 1883–1896 ===
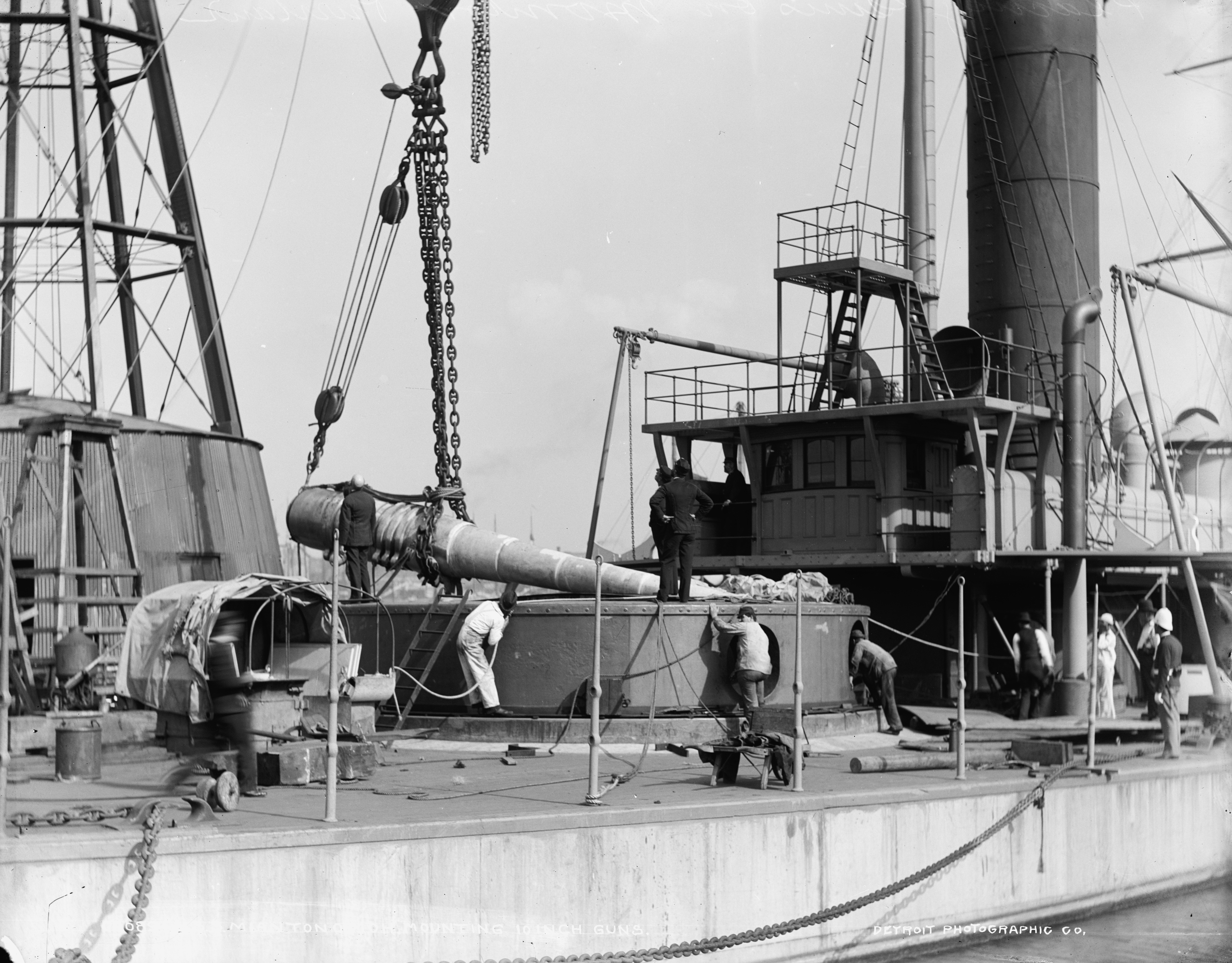
Fitting the main guns to a turret of USS Miantonomoh at the New York Navy Yard, circa 1890

After their launching, Congress decided to have the five monitors completed at the Navy's own shipyards. Amphitrite was transferred from the Harlan & Hollingsworth shipyard to the Norfolk Navy Yard in Portsmouth, Virginia; Monadnock from the Burgess yard to the Mare Island Navy Yard in Solano County, California; while Terror from William Cramp & Sons and Miantonomoh and Puritan from John Roach & Sons were all taken for completion to the New York Navy Yard in Brooklyn.

Following their transfer to the Navy yards, the ships were to suffer even longer delays due to repeated design changes, and construction proceeded at a snail's pace. A major redesign occurred in 1886, when it was decided to fit each vessel with four 10-inch breechloading cannon, and another redesign occurred in 1889. The first of the five monitors to be fully commissioned was Miantonomoh, on 27 October 1891; however, the other four vessels were not to enter service until 1895–96, more than two decades after the commencement of their construction in 1874–75.

== In service ==
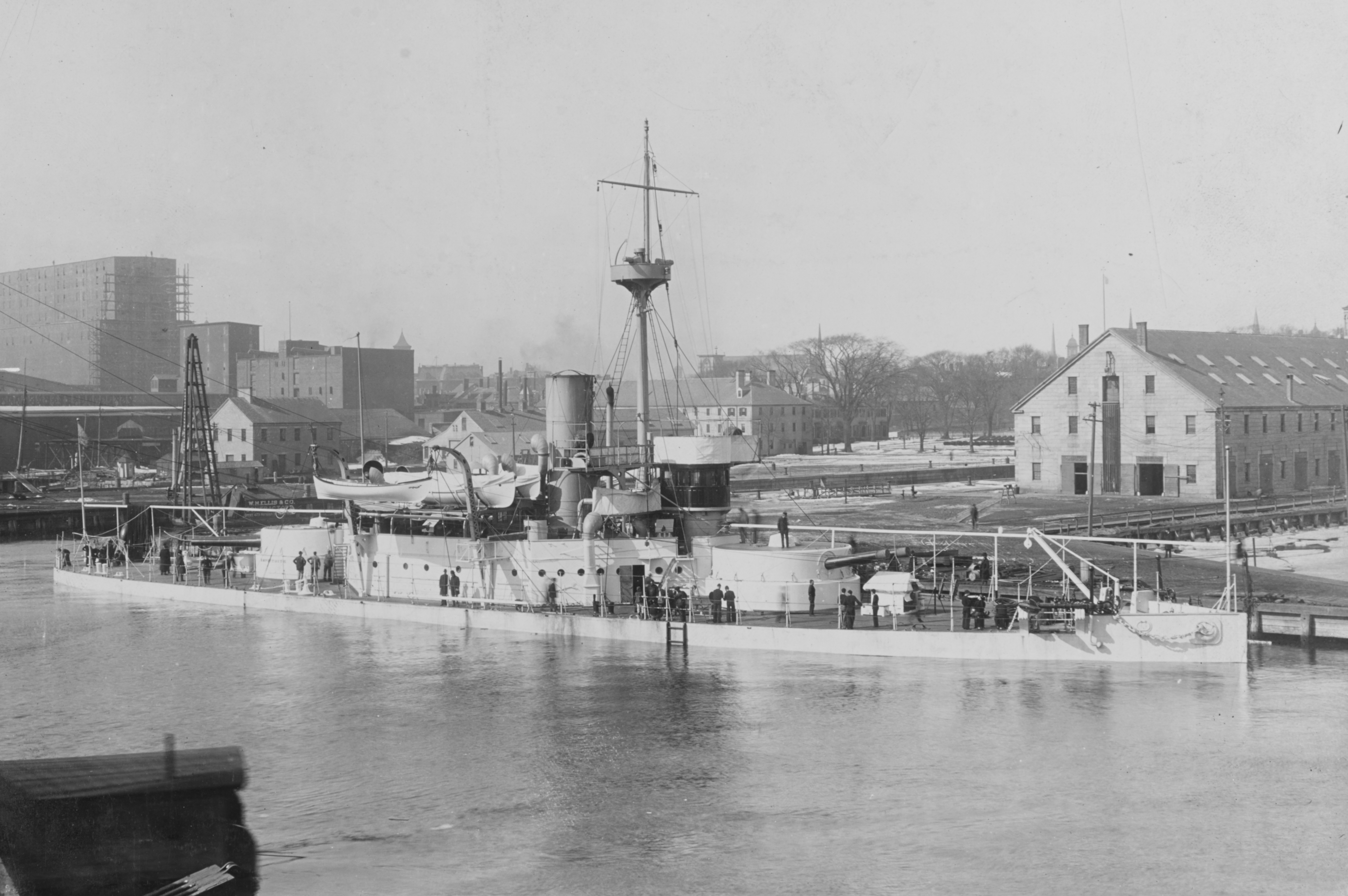
USS Amphitrite, lead ship of the Amphitrite class, at the Boston Navy Yard, 1890s

By the 1890s, the monitor concept was well and truly obsolete, if indeed it had ever been optimal. Monitor warships suffered a variety of well known defects, the most obvious of which was the type's poor suitability to oceangoing service, due mainly to the very low freeboard—a feature originally included as a means of reducing the vessel's exposure to enemy fire. Other problems which diminished the type's practicality for seagoing service were the low speed and short range due to a lack of space for fuel. An additional problem was the lack of ventilation which often made for almost unbearable heat below deck (the engine room of one particular monitor once recorded a temperature of 200 °F (93 °C)). On the positive side, monitors were considered stable gun platforms and could generally be fitted with larger guns than more conventional vessels of an equivalent tonnage.

The Amphitrite class suffered from all the usual monitor defects (as did Puritan which was eventually redesignated as a unique class due to her extra armor), and their combat limitations quickly became evident during the Spanish–American War. For example, during one sortie to Puerto Rico, USS Amphitrite had to be taken under tow as she lacked the fuel reserves to travel there under her own steam, reducing the speed of the entire fleet to a mere seven knots. Having arrived at the destination, Amphitrite's heavy guns proved effective against shore defences, but the heat within the ship was so oppressive during the 2 1/2 hour bombardment that the crew found it almost impossible to continue manning their posts, and one of the gunners actually died of heat exhaustion.

Monadnock, meanwhile, earned the distinction of becoming one of only two U.S. Navy monitors ever to cross the Pacific Ocean when she sailed for the Philippines theater in the same year, after which she remained in the Far East for the rest of her career. The other Amphitrites were withdrawn from frontline service after the war, and became training ships. USS Amphitrite saw some service in home waters during World War I, and was the last of the Amphitrite class to be decommissioned, on 31 May 1919.

== See also ==
- USS Puritan (BM-1)
