= USS Squando =

1865 American warship

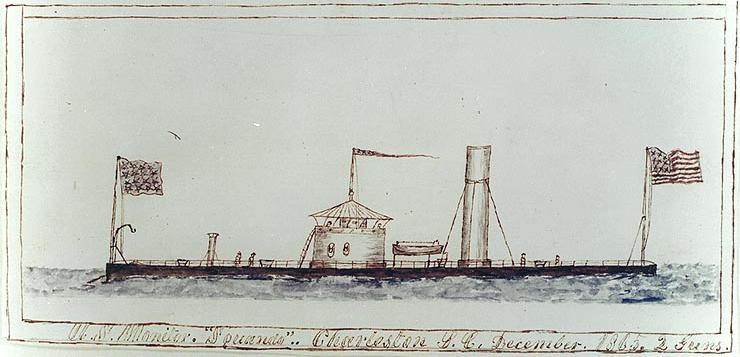
- A rough color sketch of USS Squando at Charleston, SC, in December 1865.

History

United States
- Name: USS Squando
- Builder: McKay & Aldus, East Boston, Massachusetts
- Launched: December 31, 1864 or January 6, 1865
- Completed: March 30, 1865
- Commissioned: June 6, 1865
- Decommissioned: May 26, 1866
- Fate: Broken up, 1874

General characteristics
- Class & type: Casco-class monitor
- Displacement: 1,175 or 1,618 tons
- Length: 225 ft (69 m)
- Beam: 45 ft (14 m)
- Draft: 8.3 ft (2.5 m) or 9 ft (2.7 m)
- Propulsion: 2 × marine steam engines; 2 × shafts
- Speed: 9 knots (10 mph; 17 km/h)
- Complement: 69 officers and enlisted
- Armament: 2 × 11 in (280 mm) smoothbore Dahlgren guns
- Armor: Turret: 8 in (200 mm); Pilothouse: 10 in (250 mm); Deck: 3 in (76 mm)

USS Squando was a Casco-class light draft monitor built during the American Civil War. Designed for service in rivers, the class required design changes due to the lack of seaworthiness of the first Casco-class vessel. Squando required her deck to be raised 22 inches (56 cm) before completion in order to provide more freeboard. launched in late December 1864 or early January 1865, she was commissioned on June 6, 1865. Completed after the American Civil War had wound down, she served in the North Atlantic Squadron in 1865 and 1866 before being decommissioned in May of the latter year. After being renamed twice in 1869, she was sold in 1874 and then broken up.

== Construction and characteristics ==
In mid-1862, the Union Navy leadership, having determined that a class of light-draft monitors was needed for use in the shallow waters of inland rivers, began discussing designs for monitors with a 6 feet (1.8 m) draft with John Ericsson, who had designed USS Monitor, an early Union ironclad. Ericsson provided his plan in early October, but delays and redesigns by engineer Alban C. Stimers resulted in the project design not being matured until February 1863. The designs resulted in the Casco class, of which there were to be 20 ships. Contracts for the Casco-class monitors were given out between March and June. The East Boston firm of McKay & Aldus was awarded the contract for Squando on June 10, although in July 1863 the firm's machine shop did not have steam power or a complete set of tools. She was named after Squando, a Native American involved in King Philip's War. The first member of the class to be launched was USS Chimo in May 1864. Chimo was found to be unseaworthy due to a lack of freeboard, and modifications to the design were required. Some ships of the class were greatly scaled down and turned into torpedo boats, while others had their decks raised; Squando's deck was raised 22 inches (56 cm) in order to increase her freeboard. Another ship of the Casco class, USS Tunxis, was launched in September, but despite the modifications almost sunk immediately due to taking on large quantities of water; The modifications for Squando began on September 19 and decreased her speed. Less than half of the vessels were completed before the end of the American Civil War and none saw combat. McKay spent decades after the war attempting to recoup extra costs related to the ship's construction.

According to naval historian Paul H. Silverstone, Squando was 225 feet (69 m) long, had a beam of 45 feet (14 m), and a draft of 9 feet (2.7 m), while the Dictionary of American Naval Fighting Ships (DANFS) states that she had a length of 225 feet 5 inches (68.71 m), a beam of 45 feet 2 inches (13.77 m), and a draft of 8.3 feet (2.5 m). Her depth of hold was about 11 feet (3.4 m), which was greater than the other ships of the class; this was due to the 22-inch raising of the deck. According to Silverstone, she displaced 1,618 tons, while the DANFS puts displacement at 1,175 tons. Squando was powered by two marine steam engines driving two propeller shafts, and could make a speed of 9 knots (17 km/h; 10 mph). She was manned by a crew of 69, and was armed with two smoothbore 11-inch Dahlgren guns. The turret was protected by 8 inches (20 cm) of armor, the deck by 3 inches (7.6 cm), and the pilothouse by 10 inches (25 cm). Squando was completed at a cost of $90,000.

== Service history ==
Silverstone states that Squando was launched on December 31, 1864, while the DANFS gives the date as January 6, 1865. She was completed on March 30 and was transferred to the Union Navy at the Boston Navy Yard on April 5. In March, the citizens of Boston had requested that Squando remain on duty there, for fear that foreign-built Confederate vessels could threaten the harbor. Commissioned on June 6, she was placed under the command of Acting Master George H. Leinas. Squando's fitting out process took place at Boston and New York City; she arrived at the latter place alone on June 13 after her escorting vessel, USS Gettysburg ran aground. A construction accident in late June on Squando resulted in the steamer USS Queen being damaged. Squando departed New York City on July 30.

Assigned to the North Atlantic Squadron in 1865, she traveled to Charleston, South Carolina. When she arrived at Charleston on August 2, she was the first light-draft monitor to travel south of Fort Monroe. Heading north in May 1866, and now commanded by Lieutenant George P. Ryan, she was towed to Philadelphia, Pennsylvania, by the gunboat USS Lenapee, was decommissioned on May 26 and then mothballed at League Island, Pennsylvania. The United States War Department advertised for sealed bids for Squando and several other vessels in March 1868. She was renamed to Erebus on June 15, 1869. The DANFS states that she reverted to her former name on August 10, but Silverstone claims she was given the name Algoma on that day. An 1869 newspaper report noted that she could brought up to good enough condition for active duty in "a few days", while describing the entire class of vessels as "total failures". Sold in July 1874, the vessel was then broken up that year while at League Island.

== Sources ==
- Dictionary of American Naval Fighting Ships. Vol. 3. Washington, D.C.: Office of the Chief of Naval Operations. 1968.
- Lee, John W. I.; North, Michael, eds. (2016). Globalizing Borderlands Studies in Europe and North America. Lincoln, Nebraska: University of Nebraska Press. ISBN 978-0-8032-8562-0.
- McPherson, James M. (2012). War on the Waters: The Union & Confederate Navies, 1861–1865. Chapel Hill, North Carolina: University of North Carolina Press. ISBN 978-0-8078-3588-3.
- Roberts, William H. (2002). Civil War Ironclads: The U.S. Navy and Industrial Mobilization. Baltimore, Maryland: Johns Hopkins University Press. ISBN 978-0-8018-8751-2.
- Silverstone, Paul H. (1989). Warships of the Civil War Navies. Annapolis, Maryland: Naval Institute Press. ISBN 0-87021-783-6.
