= List of ships named Modoc =

USCGC Modoc may refer to the following vessels of the United States Coast Guard:

- USCGC Modoc (WPG-46), a Tampa-class cutter which served from 1992 to 1947
- USS Bagaduce, a tug which served from 1959 to 1979, under the name USCGC Modoc (WATA-194), after serving in the United States Navy as Bagaduce

Modoc may refer to the following vessels of the United States Navy:

- USS Modoc (1865), briefly renamed Achilles, a Casco-class monitor of the US Navy which was ordered April 1863 before being canceled after launching
- Modoc (YT-16), formally Enterprise and YT-16, a tug which served the US Navy from 1898 to 1947
