= USS Shawnee =

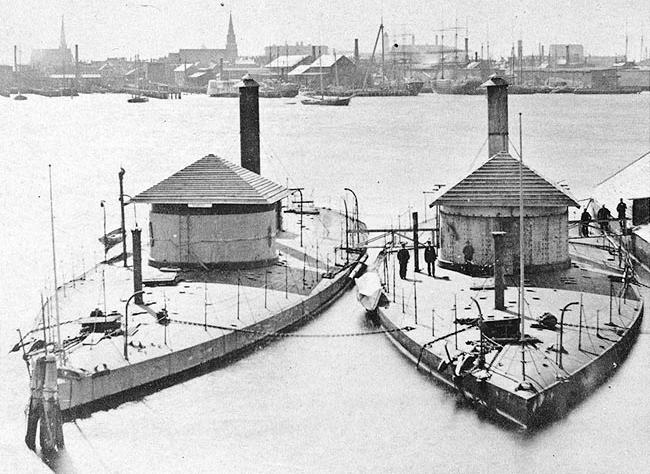
- Shawnee and Wassuc laid up at the Boston Navy Yard, circa 1871-72.

History

United States
- Name: USS Shawnee
- Ordered: April 1863
- Builder: James Tetlow (ironwork); Curtis & Tilden (woodwork); Built at the Curtis & Tilden yard in Boston, MA
- Acquired: 22 July 1865
- Commissioned: 18 August 1865
- Decommissioned: November? 1865
- Fate: Sold for scrap, 9 September 1875

General characteristics
- Class & type: Casco-class monitor
- Displacement: 1,175 long tons (1,194 t)
- Length: 225 ft (69 m)
- Beam: 45 ft (14 m)
- Draft: 9 ft (2.7 m)
- Propulsion: Screw steamer
- Speed: 9 knots (10 mph; 17 km/h)
- Complement: 69 officers and enlisted
- Armament: 2 × guns of unknown type
- Armor: Turret: 8 in (200 mm); Pilothouse: 10 in (250 mm); Hull: 3 in (76 mm); Deck: 3 in (76 mm)

USS Shawnee was a single-turreted, twin-screw monitor built by Curtis & Tilden, Boston, Massachusetts, United States. It was delivered 22 July 1865, and commissioned 18 August 1865.

Shawnee was a Casco-class, light-draft monitor intended for service in the shallow bays, rivers, and inlets of the Confederacy. These warships sacrificed armor plate for a shallow draft and were fitted with a ballast compartment designed to lower them in the water during battle.

== Design revisions ==
Though the original designs for the Casco-class monitors were drawn by John Ericsson, the final revision was created by Chief Engineer Alban C. Stimers following Rear Admiral Samuel F. Du Pont's failed bombardment of Fort Sumter in 1863. By the time that the plans were put before the Monitor Board in New York City, Ericsson and Simers had a poor relationship, and Chief of the Bureau of Construction and Repair John Lenthall had little connection to the board. This resulted in the plans being approved and 20 vessels ordered without serious scrutiny of the new design. $14 million US was allocated for the construction of these vessels. It was discovered that Stimers had failed to compensate for the armor his revisions added to the original plan and this resulted in excessive stress on the wooden hull frames and a freeboard of only 3 inches. Stimers was removed from the control of the project and Ericsson was called in to undo the damage. He was forced to raise the hulls of the monitors under construction by 22 inches to make them seaworthy.

== Fate ==
Therefore, the Navy Department ordered on 10 November 1865 that Shawnee to be laid up in ordinary at the Boston Navy Yard. In June 1869, she was renamed Eolus, but regained her original name less than two months later. Shawnee was sold for scrap on 9 September 1875.
