= USS Napa (1864) =

Torpedo boat of the United States Navy

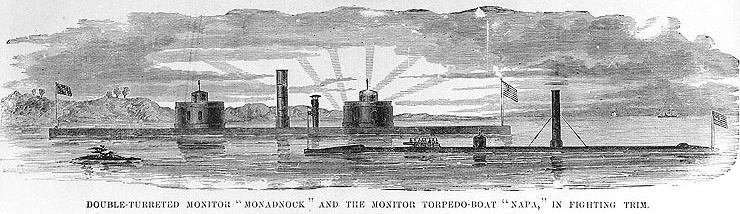
- The USS Napa and the USS Monadnock from an engraving published in "The Soldier in Our Civil War".

History

United States
- Namesake: Napa County, California
- Ordered: April 1863
- Launched: 26 November 1864
- Commissioned: Never
- Fate: Broken up, 1875

General characteristics
- Class & type: Casco-class light-draft monitor
- Displacement: 1,175 tons
- Length: 225 ft (69 m)
- Beam: 45 ft (14 m)
- Draft: 9 ft (2.7 m)
- Propulsion: Screw Steamer
- Speed: 9 knots (17 km/h)
- Complement: 60 officers and enlisted
- Armament: 1 × 11 in Dahlgren Smoothbore gun, 1 × spar torpedo
- Armor: 10 in pilothouse, 3 in hull, 3 in deck

USS Napa was a Casco class twin-screw light draft monitor built during the American Civil War for operation in the shallow inland waters of the Confederacy. These warships sacrificed armor plate for a shallow draft and were fitted with a ballast compartment designed to lower them in the water during battle.

== Construction ==
The single-turreted Napa was built by the Harlan & Hollingsworth Co., Wilmington, DE, and launched 26 November 1864. Though the original designs for the Casco-class monitors were drawn by John Ericsson, the final revision was created by Chief Engineer Alban B. Stimers following Rear Admiral Samuel F. Du Pont's failed bombardment of Fort Sumter in 1863. By the time that the plans were put before the Monitor Board in New York City, Ericsson and Stimers had a poor relationship, and Chief of the Bureau of Construction and Repair John Lenthall had little connection to the board. This resulted in the plans being approved and 20 vessels ordered without serious scrutiny of the new design. $14 million US was allocated for the construction of these vessels. It was discovered that Stimers had failed to compensate for the armor his revisions added to the original plan and this resulted in excessive stress on the wooden hull frames and a freeboard of only 3 inches (76 mm). Stimers was removed from the control of the project and Ericsson was called in to undo the damage. He was forced to raise the hulls of the monitors under construction by nearly two feet and the first few completed vessels had their turrets removed and a single pivot-mount 11 inch Dahlgren cannon mounted. These same few vessels had a retractable spar torpedo added as well.

== Torpedo vessel conversion ==
As a result, Napa was converted to a torpedo vessel, 25 June 1864 and turned over to the government upon her completion 4 May 1865. Never commissioned, she was laid up at League Island, PA, until 1875 when she was broken up by John Roach at New York. While at League Island, her name was changed twice: to Nemesis, 15 June 1869; and back to Napa, 10 August 1869.
