= USS Yuma (1865) =

1865 monitor

History

United States
- Name: USS Yuma
- Ordered: April 1863
- Builder: Alexander Swift and Co., Cincinnati, Ohio
- Launched: 30 March 1865
- Commissioned: Never commissioned
- Fate: Sold, 12 September 1874

General characteristics
- Class & type: Casco-class monitor
- Displacement: 1,175 long tons (1,194 t)
- Length: 225 ft (69 m)
- Beam: 45 ft (14 m)
- Draft: 9 ft (2.7 m)
- Propulsion: Screw steamer
- Speed: 9 knots (10 mph; 17 km/h)
- Complement: 60 officers and enlisted
- Armament: 2 × 11 in (280 mm) smoothbore Dahlgren guns
- Armor: Turret: 8 in (200 mm); Pilothouse: 10 in (250 mm); Hull: 3 in (76 mm); Deck: 3 in (76 mm)

USS Yuma, a single-turreted, twin-screw monitor, was laid down at Cincinnati, Ohio, by Alexander Swift and Co. and launched on 30 May 1865. A Casco-class, light-draft monitor, she was intended for service in the shallow bays, rivers, and inlets of the Confederacy. These warships sacrificed armor plate for a shallow draft and were fitted with a ballast compartment designed to lower them in the water during battle.

== Design revisions ==
Though the original designs for the Casco-class monitors were drawn by John Ericsson, the final revision was created by Chief Engineer Alban C. Stimers following Rear Admiral Samuel F. Du Pont's failed bombardment of Fort Sumter in 1863. By the time that the plans were put before the Monitor Board in New York City, Ericsson and Simers had a poor relationship, and Chief of the Bureau of Construction and Repair John Lenthall had little connection to the board. This resulted in the plans being approved and 20 vessels ordered without serious scrutiny of the new design. $14 million US was allocated for the construction of these vessels. It was discovered that Stimers had failed to compensate for the armor his revisions added to the original plan and this resulted in excessive stress on the wooden hull frames and a freeboard of only 3 inches (76 mm). Stimers was removed from the control of the project and Ericsson was called in to undo the damage. He was forced to raise the hulls of the monitors under construction by 22 inches (560 mm) to make them seaworthy.

== Fate ==
Alterations were accordingly carried out on the vessel during the spring of 1866 to remedy the shortcoming in design, but the ship never saw active service. Laid up from 1866 to 1874, Yuma was twice renamed during this time period: first, to Tempest on 15 June 1869 and, second, back to Yuma on 10 August 1869.

The monitor was subsequently sold at auction to Theodore Allen, at New Orleans, Louisiana, on 12 September 1874.
