= USS Yazoo (1865) =

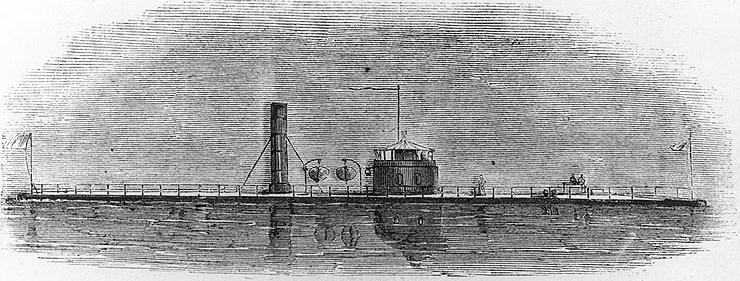
- An engraving of the USS Yazoo published in Harper′s Weekly

History

United States
- Name: USS Yazoo
- Ordered: April 1863
- Builder: Merrick & Sons, Philadelphia, Pennsylvania
- Yard number: 119
- Laid down: March 1863
- Launched: 8 May 1865
- Commissioned: Never commissioned
- Fate: Sold for scrap, 5 September 1874

General characteristics
- Class & type: Casco-class monitor
- Displacement: 1,175 long tons (1,194 t)
- Length: 225 ft (69 m)
- Beam: 45 ft (14 m)
- Draft: 9 ft (2.7 m)
- Propulsion: Screw steamer
- Speed: 9 knots (10 mph; 17 km/h)
- Complement: 80 officers and enlisted
- Armament: 2 × 11 in (280 mm) smoothbore Dahlgren guns
- Armor: Turret: 8 in (200 mm); Pilothouse: 10 in (250 mm); Hull: 3 in (76 mm); Deck: 3 in (76 mm)

USS Yazoo — a single-turreted, twin-screw monitor — was laid down in March 1863, before final government approval had been given, by Merrick & Sons, Philadelphia.; launched on 8 May 1865; and completed on 15 December 1865.

Yazoo was a Casco-class monitor intended for service in the shallow bays, sounds, rivers, and inlets of the Confederacy. These warships sacrificed armor plate for a shallow draft and were fitted with a ballast compartment designed to enable them to ride exceptionally low in the water during battle.

== Design revisions ==
Though the original designs for the Casco-class monitors were drawn by John Ericsson, the final revision was created by Chief Engineer Alban C. Stimers following Rear Admiral Samuel F. Du Pont's failed bombardment of Fort Sumter in 1863. By the time that the plans were put before the Monitor Board in New York City, Ericsson and Stimers had a poor relationship, and Chief of the Bureau of Construction and Repair John Lenthall had little connection to the board. This resulted in the plans being approved and 20 vessels ordered without serious scrutiny of the new design. $14 million US was allocated for the construction of these vessels. It was discovered that Stimers had failed to compensate for the armor his revisions added to the original plan and this resulted in excessive stress on the wooden hull frames and a freeboard of only 3 inches. Stimers was removed from the control of the project and Ericsson was called in to undo the damage. He was forced to raise the hulls of the monitors under construction by 22 inches to make them seaworthy.

== Fate ==
The ship was laid up at the Philadelphia Navy Yard on 20 December 1865, where Yazoo was extensively reworked. Nevertheless, since her class design had proven disappointing she saw no commissioned service. Her name was changed twice: first to Tartar on 15 June 1869 and then back to Yazoo on 10 August 1869. Yazoo was sold at Philadelphia on 5 September 1874 to A. Purvis & Son.
