= USS Klamath =

History

United States
- Name: USS Klamath
- Ordered: April 1863
- Builder: S. T. Hambleton & Co., Cincinnati
- Launched: 20 April 1865
- Acquired: 6 May 1866
- Commissioned: Never commissioned
- Fate: Sold, 12 September 1874

General characteristics
- Class & type: Casco-class monitor
- Displacement: 1,175 long tons (1,194 t)
- Length: 225 ft (69 m)
- Beam: 45 ft (14 m)
- Draft: 9 ft (2.7 m)
- Propulsion: Screw steamer
- Speed: 9 knots (10 mph; 17 km/h)
- Complement: 69 officers and enlisted
- Armament: 2 × 11 in (280 mm) smoothbore Dahlgren guns
- Armor: Turret: 8 in (200 mm); Pilothouse: 10 in (250 mm); Hull: 3 in (76 mm); Deck: 3 in (76 mm)

USS Klamath—a single-turreted, twin-screw monitor of the United States Navy—was launched 20 April 1865 by S. T. Hambleton & Co., Cincinnati, OH, under subcontract with Alexander Swift & Co., also of Cincinnati, OH. She was delivered to the Navy on 6 May 1866 but was never commissioned and saw no service.

Klamath was a Casco-class, light-draft monitor intended for service in the shallow bays, rivers, and inlets of the Confederacy. These warships sacrificed armor plate for a shallow draft and were fitted with a ballast compartment designed to lower them in the water during battle.

== Design revisions ==
Though the original designs for the Casco-class monitors were drawn by John Ericsson, the final revision was created by Chief Engineer Alban C. Stimers following Rear Admiral Samuel F. Du Pont's failed bombardment of Fort Sumter in 1863. By the time that the plans were put before the Monitor Board in New York City, Ericsson and Stimers had a poor relationship, and the Chief of the Bureau of Construction and Repair, John Lenthall, had little connection to the board. This resulted in the plans being approved and 20 vessels ordered without serious scrutiny of the new design. $14 million US was allocated for the construction of these vessels. It was discovered that Simers had failed to compensate for the armor his revisions added to the original plan and this resulted in excessive stress on the wooden hull frames and a freeboard of only 3 inches. Stimers was removed from the control of the project and Ericsson was called in to undo the damage. He was forced to raise the hulls of the monitors under construction by 22 inches to make them seaworthy.

== Fate ==
As a result, she was laid up at Mound City, IL. She was renamed Harpy 15 June 1869, but was changed back to Klamath 10 August of that same year. She was moved to New Orleans, LA in 1870, and sold at auction there to Schickels, Harrison & Co. 12 September 1874.
