= USS Umpqua (1865) =

History

United States
- Name: USS Umpqua
- Builder: Snowden & Mason, Brownsville, Pennsylvania
- Laid down: March 1863
- Launched: 21 December 1865
- Commissioned: Never commissioned
- Stricken: 1874 (est.)
- Home port: Mound City, Illinois; New Orleans, Louisiana
- Fate: Sold, 12 September 1874

General characteristics
- Class & type: Casco-class monitor
- Displacement: 1,175 long tons (1,194 t)
- Length: 225 ft (69 m)
- Beam: 45 ft (14 m)
- Draft: 6 ft (1.8 m)
- Propulsion: steam engine; twin-screw propelled
- Speed: 9 knots (10 mph; 17 km/h)
- Complement: 69 officers and enlisted
- Armament: 2 × 11 in (280 mm) smoothbore Dahlgren guns
- Armor: Turret: 8 in (200 mm); Pilothouse: 10 in (250 mm); Hull: 3 in (76 mm); Deck: 3 in (76 mm)

USS Umpqua, a single-turreted, twin-screw monitor, was laid down in March 1863, before the official order had been placed, at Brownsville, Pennsylvania, by Snowden & Mason; launched on 21 December 1865; and completed on 7 May 1866.

== Characteristics of the class ==
Umpqua was a Casco-class monitor intended for service in the shallow bays, rivers, and inlets of the Confederacy. These warships sacrificed armor plate for a shallow draft and were fitted with a ballast compartment designed to lower them in the water during battle to reduce the target they provided enemy guns.

== Engineering and construction difficulties ==
Though the original designs for the Casco-class monitors were drawn by John Ericsson, the final revision was created by Chief Engineer Alban B. Simers following Rear Admiral Samuel F. Du Pont's failed bombardment of Fort Sumter in 1863. By the time that the plans were put before the Monitor Board in New York City, Ericsson and Simers had a poor relationship, and Chief of the Bureau of Construction and Repair John Lenthall had little connection to the board. This resulted in the plans being approved and 20 vessels ordered without serious scrutiny of the new design. $14 million US was allocated for the construction of these vessels. It was discovered that Simers had failed to compensate for the armor his revisions added to the original plan and this resulted in excessive stress on the wooden hull frames and a freeboard of only 3 inches. Simers was removed from the control of the project and Ericsson was called in to undo the damage. He was forced to raise the hulls of the monitors under construction by 22 inches to make them seaworthy.

As a result, the Navy Department ordered on 24 June 1864 that Umpqua's deck be raised to provide sufficient freeboard. Upon delivery, the monitor was laid up at Mound City, IL; and she saw no commissioned service. In August 1868, she was moved to New Orleans, LA. Her name was changed to Fury on 15 June 1869, but she resumed the name Umpqua on 10 August 1869.

== Decommissioning and sale ==
Umpqua was sold at New Orleans on 12 September 1874 to Nathaniel McKay.

== See also ==
- United States Navy
- American Civil War
