= USS Naubuc (1864) =

Torpedo boat of the United States Navy

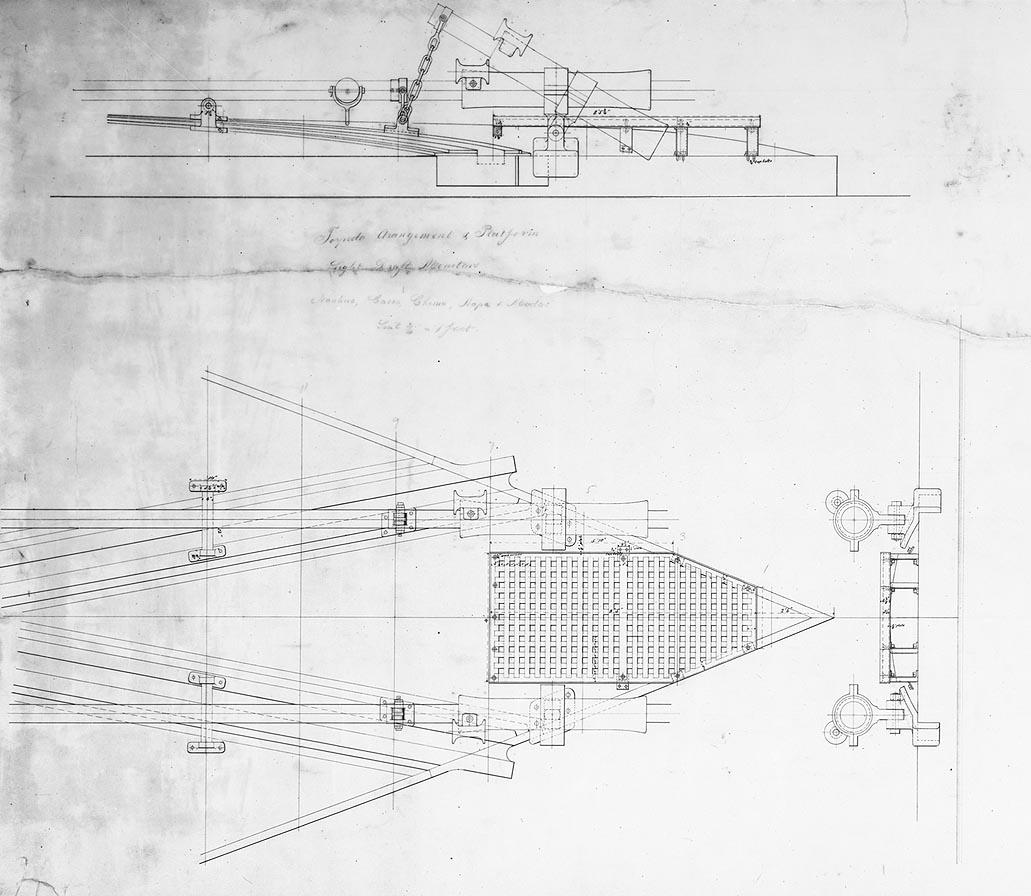
- The plans for the torpedo mechanism on the modified Casco-class monitors.

History

United States
- Name: USS Naubuc
- Ordered: April 1863
- Builder: Perine's Union Iron Works, Williamsburg, Brooklyn
- Launched: 19 October 1864
- Commissioned: 27 March 1865
- Fate: Broken up, 1875

General characteristics
- Class & type: Casco-class monitor
- Displacement: 1,175 long tons (1,194 t)
- Length: 225 ft (69 m)
- Beam: 45 ft (14 m)
- Draft: 9 ft (2.7 m)
- Propulsion: Screw steamer
- Speed: 9 knots (10 mph; 17 km/h)
- Complement: 69 officers and enlisted
- Armament: 1 × 11 in (280 mm) smoothbore pivot Dahlgren gun; 1 × spar torpedo
- Armor: Turret: 8 in (200 mm); [turret removed]; Pilothouse: 10 in (250 mm); Hull: 3 in (76 mm); Deck: 3 in (76 mm)

The first USS Naubuc, laid down as a 1,175-ton light-draft monitor at Perine's Union Iron Works, Williamsburgh, NY, was launched 19 October 1864. However, as with others of her class, she was of faulty design and was found to be unseaworthy prior to her completion. She was then converted to a torpedo boat, 4th rate, with one XI-inch Dahlgren smoothbore, and arid Wood-Lay spar torpedo equipment.

== Design revisions ==
Though the original designs for the Casco-class monitors were drawn by John Ericsson, the final revision was created by Chief Engineer Alban C. Stimers following Rear Admiral Samuel F. Du Pont's failed bombardment of Fort Sumter in 1863. By the time that the plans were put before the Monitor Board in New York City, Ericsson and Simers had a poor relationship, and Chief of the Bureau of Construction and Repair John Lenthall had little connection to the board. This resulted in the plans being approved and 20 vessels ordered without serious scrutiny of the new design. $14 million US was allocated for the construction of these vessels. It was discovered that Stimers had failed to compensate for the armour his revisions added to the original plan and this resulted in excessive stress on the wooden hull frames and a freeboard of only 3 inches. Stimers was removed from the control of the project and Ericsson was called in to undo the damage. He was forced to raise the hulls of the monitors under construction by nearly two feet and the first few completed vessels had their turrets removed and were converted to torpedo boats with the weapons listed above.

== Fate ==
Commissioned 27 March 1865, she saw no service and on 27 June 1865 was ordered to be laid up at the New York Navy Yard. In common with nearly all her many sister ships, while at the Navy Yard she was renamed twice: Gorgon, 15 June 1869; and Minnetonka, 10 August 1869. In 1875, she was broken up by Harlan and Hollingsworth, Wilmington, Delaware.
