= USS Waxsaw (1865) =

History

United States
- Name: USS Waxsaw
- Builder: A. & W. Denmead & Son, Baltimore, Maryland
- Laid down: March 1863
- Launched: 4 May 1865
- Commissioned: Never commissioned
- Fate: Broken up, 25 August 1875

General characteristics
- Class & type: Casco-class monitor
- Displacement: 1,175 long tons (1,194 t)
- Length: 225 ft (69 m)
- Beam: 45 ft (14 m)
- Draft: 9 ft (2.7 m)
- Propulsion: Screw steamer
- Speed: 9 knots (10 mph; 17 km/h)
- Complement: 69 officers and enlisted
- Armament: 2 × 11 in (280 mm) smoothbore Dahlgren guns
- Armor: Turret: 8 in (200 mm); Pilothouse: 10 in (250 mm); Hull: 3 in (76 mm); Deck: 3 in (76 mm)

USS Waxsaw, a single-turreted, twin-screw monitor, was laid down in March 1863, before the official order had been placed, at Baltimore, Maryland, by A. & W. Denmead & Son; launched on 4 May 1865; and completed on 21 October 1865.

Waxsaw was a Casco-class, light-draft monitor intended for service in the shallow bays, rivers, and inlets of the Confederacy. These warships sacrificed armor plate for a shallow draft and were fitted with a ballast compartment designed to lower them in the water during battle.

== Design revisions ==
Though the original designs for the Casco-class monitors were drawn by John Ericsson, the final revision was created by Chief Engineer Alban C. Stimers following Rear Admiral Samuel F. Du Pont's failed bombardment of Fort Sumter in 1863. By the time that the plans were put before the Monitor Board in New York City, Ericsson and Simers had a poor relationship, and Chief of the Bureau of Construction and Repair John Lenthall had little connection to the board. This resulted in the plans being approved and 20 vessels ordered without serious scrutiny of the new design. $14 million US was allocated for the construction of these vessels. It was discovered that Stimers had failed to compensate for the armor his revisions added to the original plan and this resulted in excessive stress on the wooden hull frames and a freeboard of only 3 inches. Stimers was removed from the control of the project and Ericsson was called in to undo the damage. He was forced to raise the hulls of the monitors under construction by 22 inches to make them seaworthy.

== Fate ==
As a result, the Navy Department ordered on 24 June 1864 that Waxsaw's deck be raised to provide sufficient freeboard. Upon delivery, the monitor was laid up at the Philadelphia Navy Yard; and she saw no commissioned service.

She was renamed Niobe on 15 June 1869. She would be broken up at New York, NY by John Roach on 25 August 1875.
