= USS Tunxis (1864) =

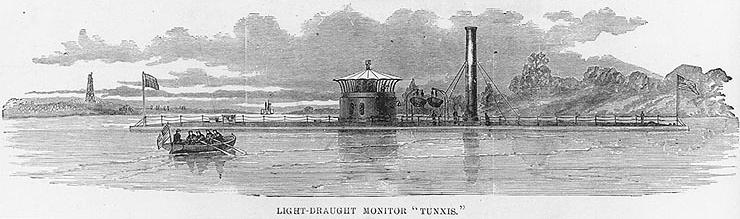
- Engraving of USS Tunxis published in "The Soldier in Our Civil War"

History

United States
- Name: USS Tunxis
- Ordered: April 1863
- Builder: Reaney, Son & Archbold, Chester, Pennsylvania
- Launched: 4 June 1864
- Commissioned: 12 July 1864
- Decommissioned: September 1864
- Fate: Broken up, 1874

General characteristics
- Class & type: Casco-class monitor
- Displacement: 1,175 long tons (1,194 t)
- Length: 225 ft (69 m)
- Beam: 45 ft (14 m)
- Draft: 9 ft (2.7 m)
- Propulsion: Screw steamer
- Speed: 9 knots (17 km/h)
- Complement: 69 officers and enlisted
- Armament: 1 × 11 in (280 mm) smoothbore Dahlgren guns; 1 × 150-pounder rifle
- Armor: Turret: 8 in (200 mm); Pilothouse: 10 in (250 mm); Hull: 3 in (76 mm); Deck: 3 in (76 mm)

The first USS Tunxis was launched on 4 June 1864 at Chester, Pennsylvania, by Reaney, Son & Archbold; and commissioned at the Philadelphia Navy Yard on 12 July 1864. On 21 September 1864, the light-draft monitor departed the sheltered waters of the navy yard on her maiden voyage. However, she soon began taking on water at such an alarming rate that she came about and returned to Philadelphia where she was decommissioned later in the month.

== Design revisions ==
Though the original designs for the Casco-class monitors were drawn by John Ericsson, the final revision was created by Chief Engineer Alban C. Stimers following Rear Admiral Samuel F. Du Pont's failed bombardment of Fort Sumter in 1863. By the time that the plans were put before the Monitor Board in New York City, Ericsson and Stimers had a poor relationship, and Chief of the Bureau of Construction and Repair John Lenthall had little connection to the board. This resulted in the plans being approved and 20 vessels ordered without serious scrutiny of the new design. $14 million US was allocated for the construction of these vessels. It was discovered that Stimers had failed to compensate for the armour his revisions added to the original plan and this resulted in excessive stress on the wooden hull frames and a freeboard of only 3 inches. Stimers was removed from the control of the project and Ericsson was called in to undo the damage. He was forced to raise the hulls of the monitors under construction by nearly two feet and the first few completed vessels had their turrets removed and a single pivot-mount 11 inch Dahlgren cannon mounted. These same few vessels had a retractable spar torpedo added as well.

Tunxis would be the first monitor of the class to keep her armoured turret. On 19 October 1864 Tunxis entered William Cramp & Sons' shipyard, Philadelphia, for extensive refit and rebuilding. On 12 July 1866, two years to the day since her first commissioning, the monitor emerged from the complete overhaul far more seaworthy than before. Nevertheless, since her class design had proven disappointing, she was immediately laid up at League Island Navy Yard.

== Fate ==
On 15 June 1869, her name was changed to Hydra; and, on 10 August 1869, she was renamed Otsego. In 1874, Otsego was broken up for scrap, having never seen active service.

== See also ==
- Union Navy
