= USS Monadnock (BM-3) =

US Navy monitor

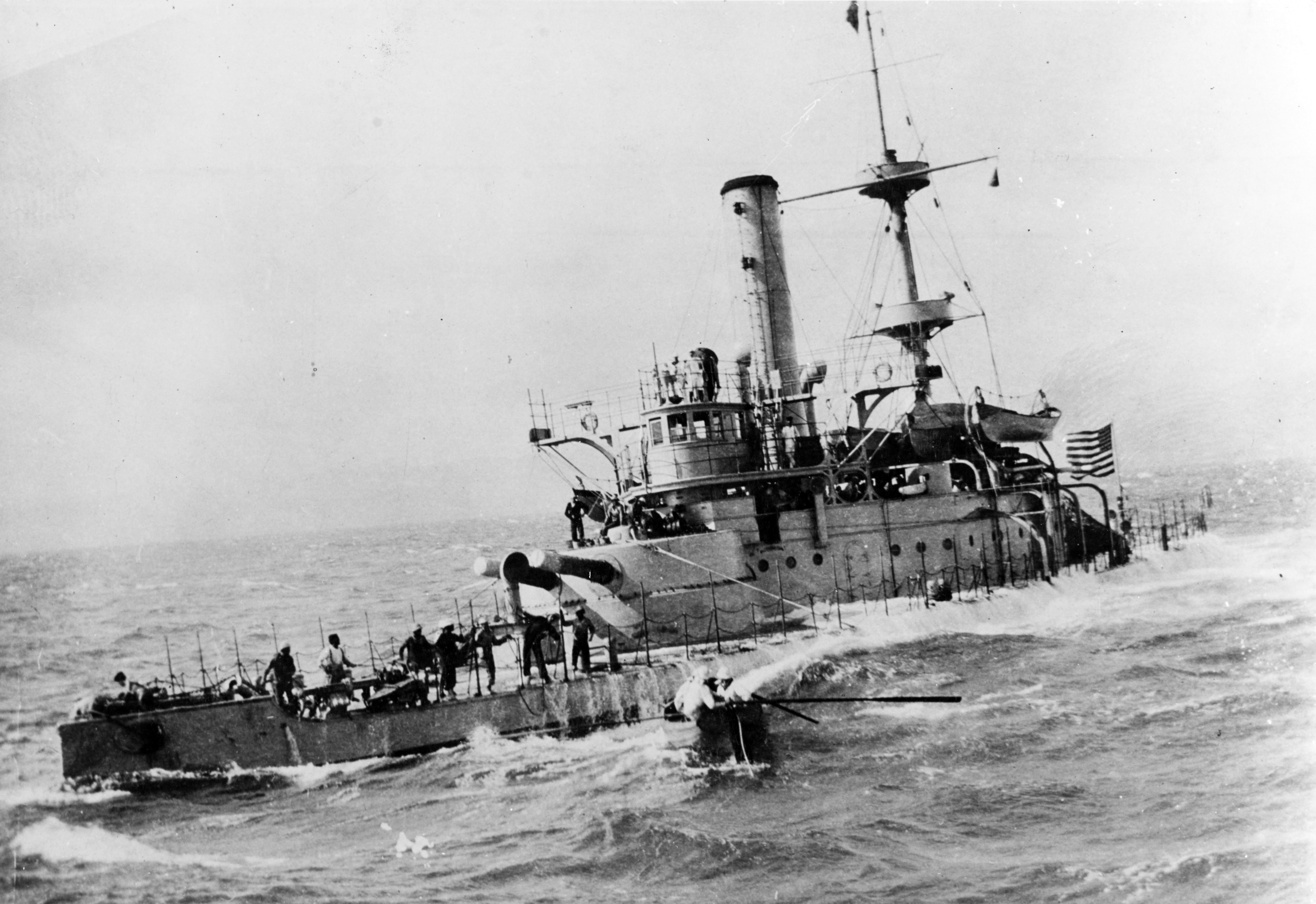
- Monadnock crossing the Pacific Ocean during the Spanish–American War

History

United States
- Name: USS Monadnock
- Ordered: 23 June 1874
- Builder: Continental Iron Works (Greenpoint, NY); Phineas Burgess (Vallejo, CA); Mare Island Navy Yard (Mare Island, CA)
- Cost: $2,069,622 (hull and machinery)
- Laid down: 1874
- Launched: 19 September 1883
- Commissioned: 20 February 1896
- Decommissioned: 24 March 1919
- Stricken: 2 February 1923
- Fate: Sold, 24 August 1923

General characteristics
- Type: Amphitrite class monitor
- Displacement: 3,990 long tons (4,054 t)
- Length: 262 ft 3 in (79.93 m)
- Beam: 55 ft 5 in (16.89 m)
- Draft: 14 ft 6 in (4.42 m)
- Propulsion: Steam engine
- Speed: 11.6 knots (21.5 km/h; 13.3 mph)
- Complement: 156 officers and enlisted
- Armament: 4 × 10 in (254 mm)/caliber guns; 2 × 4 in (100 mm) guns; 2 × 6-pounder guns; 2 × 3-pounder guns; 2 × 1-pounder guns

The second USS Monadnock was an iron-hulled, twin-screw, double-turreted monitor of the Amphitrite class in the United States Navy which saw service in the Spanish–American War.

On June 23, 1874, in response to the Virginius Incident the previous year, President Ulysses S. Grant's Secretary of Navy George M. Robeson ordered the old Monadnock and four other large monitors "reconstructed"—that is, broken up and replaced by a newly-built ship of the same name incorporating some of the old ship's materiel. Reconstruction of the Monadnock was contracted to Phineas Burgess, who opened a facility in Vallejo, California for re-assembling components built at the Continental Iron Works in New York City; launched 19 September 1883; completed at Mare Island Navy Yard; and commissioned there 20 February 1896, Captain George W. Sumner in command, Lt. Cdr. Edward D. Taussig, executive officer.

== Service history ==
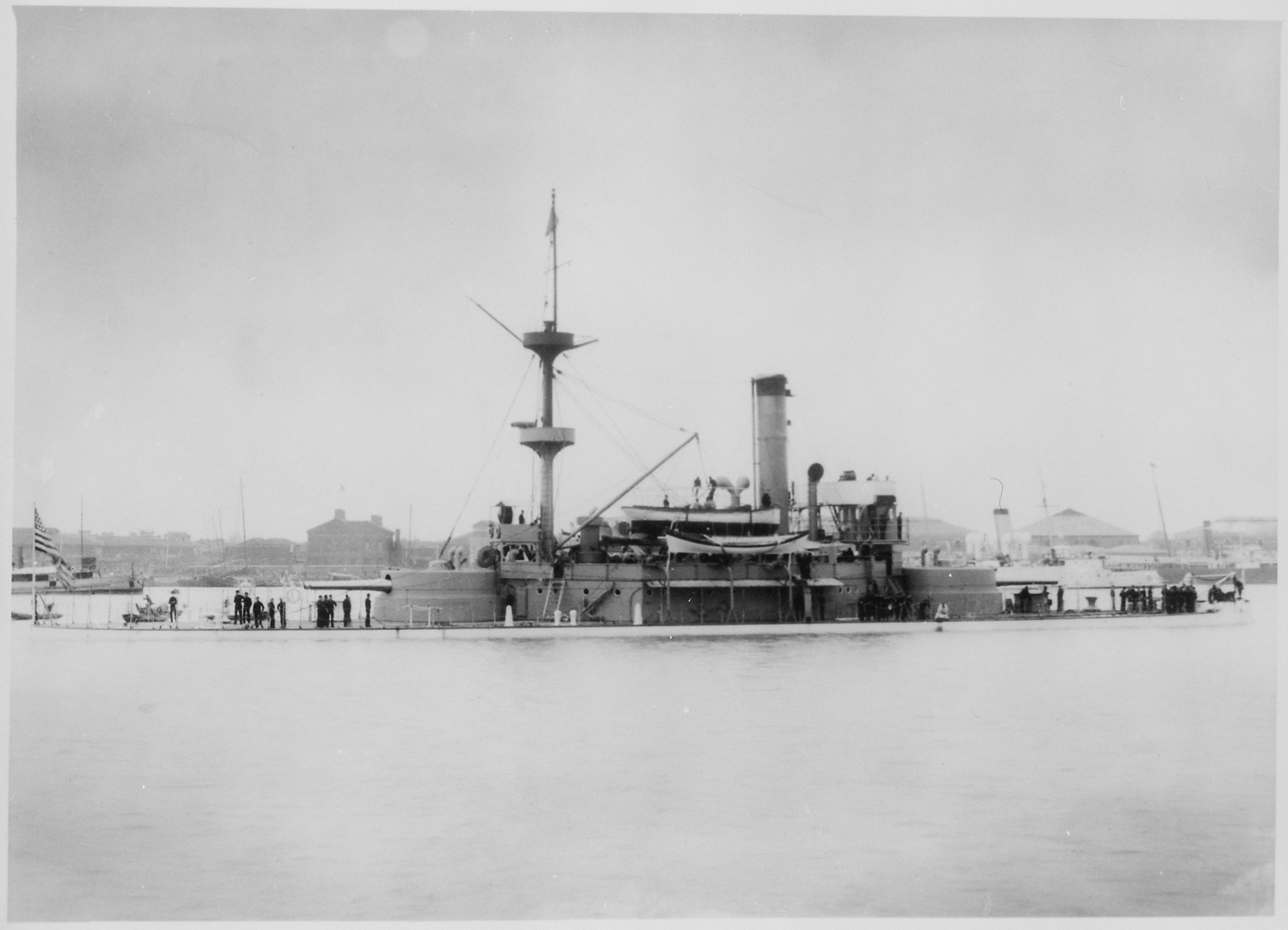
Monadnock, starboard side, in Chinese waters ca. 1901 (National Archives and Records Administration)

After fitting out Monadnock served as a unit of the Pacific Squadron along the west coast. During the next two years exercises and training cruises sent her along the Pacific coast from Puget Sound to the Baja California peninsula. After the outbreak of war with Spain, she was ordered to join Admiral George Dewey's squadron in the Philippines. She departed San Francisco, California, on 23 June 1898, touched at Hawaii early in July, and reached Manila Bay on 16 August.

On February 10, 1899, several reports indicate the Monadnock participated in the Battle of Caloocan, a town a few miles north of Manila. She also participated in other fighting, such as late February shelling of a city.

She operated on blockade duty in the Mariveles-Manila-Cavite area, with brief voyages to Hong Kong, until December 1899.

On 26 December she sailed for Hong Kong, and for the next five years cruised the rivers of China, particularly the Yangtze, and along her coast to protect American interests. Between 27 January and 7 October 1901, she stood almost continuous duty at the mouth of the Yangtze protecting the foreign settlement at Shanghai, operating similarly on three further occasions: 6 December 1902 to 8 April 1903; 18 September 1903 to 10 March 1904; and 8 April 1904 to 28 November 1904.

On 3 February 1905 she returned to Cavite. Operating out of Olongapo, she remained in the Philippines, with two interruptions for brief visits to Hong Kong, until decommissioned at Cavite on 10 March 1909.

Recommissioned in reserve 20 April 1911, she resumed operations out of Olongapo, until placed in full commission 31 January 1912 at Cavite. For the next seven years she cruised with submarines, and towed targets. Decommissioning for the last time 24 March 1919, her name was struck off the Navy list on 2 February 1923, and her hull was sold, on the Asiatic Station, 24 August 1923.

== Awards ==
- Spanish Campaign Medal
- Philippine Campaign Medal
- China Relief Expedition Medal
- World War I Victory Medal
