= USS Modoc (1865) =

Torpedo boat of the United States Navy

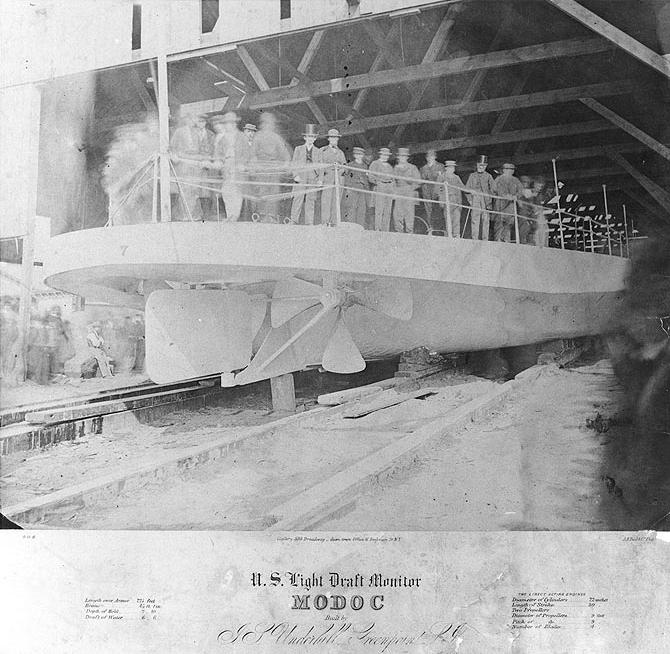
- USS Modoc just prior to launching

History

United States
- Name: USS Modoc
- Ordered: April 1863
- Builder: J.S. Underhill, Greenpoint, Brooklyn
- Launched: June 1865
- Commissioned: Never commissioned
- Fate: Broken up, August 1875

General characteristics
- Class & type: Casco-class monitor
- Displacement: 1,175 long tons (1,194 t)
- Length: 225 ft (69 m)
- Beam: 45 ft (14 m)
- Draft: 9 ft (2.7 m)
- Propulsion: Screw steamer
- Speed: 9 knots (17 km/h; 10 mph)
- Complement: 71 officers and enlisted
- Armament: 1 × 11 in (280 mm) smoothbore Dahlgren gun; 1 × spar torpedo
- Armor: Turret: 8 in (200 mm); Pilothouse: 10 in (250 mm); Hull: 3 in (76 mm); Deck: 3 in (76 mm)

USS Modoc, a single turret, an 1,175-ton Casco-class light draft monitor built under contract by J. S. Underhill at Greenpoint, Brooklyn, was completed as a spar torpedo vessel in June 1865. She had no active service, spending her entire Navy career laid up "in ordinary" at Philadelphia. The vessel was renamed Achilles on 15 June 1869, but returned to Modoc on 10 August. The ship was broken up at New York in August 1875.

== Design revisions ==
Though the original designs for the Casco-class monitors were drawn by John Ericsson, the final revision was created by Chief Engineer Alban C. Stimers following Rear Admiral Samuel F. Du Pont's failed bombardment of Fort Sumter in 1863. By the time that the plans were put before the Monitor Board in New York City, Ericsson and Simers had a poor relationship, and Chief of the Bureau of Construction and Repair John Lenthall had little connection to the board. This resulted in the plans being approved and 20 vessels ordered without serious scrutiny of the new design. $14 million US was allocated for the construction of these vessels. It was discovered that Stimers had failed to compensate for the armour his revisions added to the original plan and this resulted in excessive stress on the wooden hull frames and a freeboard of only 3 inches (76 mm). Stimers was removed from the control of the project and Ericsson was called in to undo the damage. He was forced to raise the hulls of the monitors under construction by nearly two feet and the first few completed vessels had their turrets removed and were converted to torpedo boats with the weapons listed to the right.

== Fate ==
Modoc was renamed Achilles on 15 June 1869, but received her original name back on 10 August. She was sold to John Roach and broken up at New York, New York in August 1875.

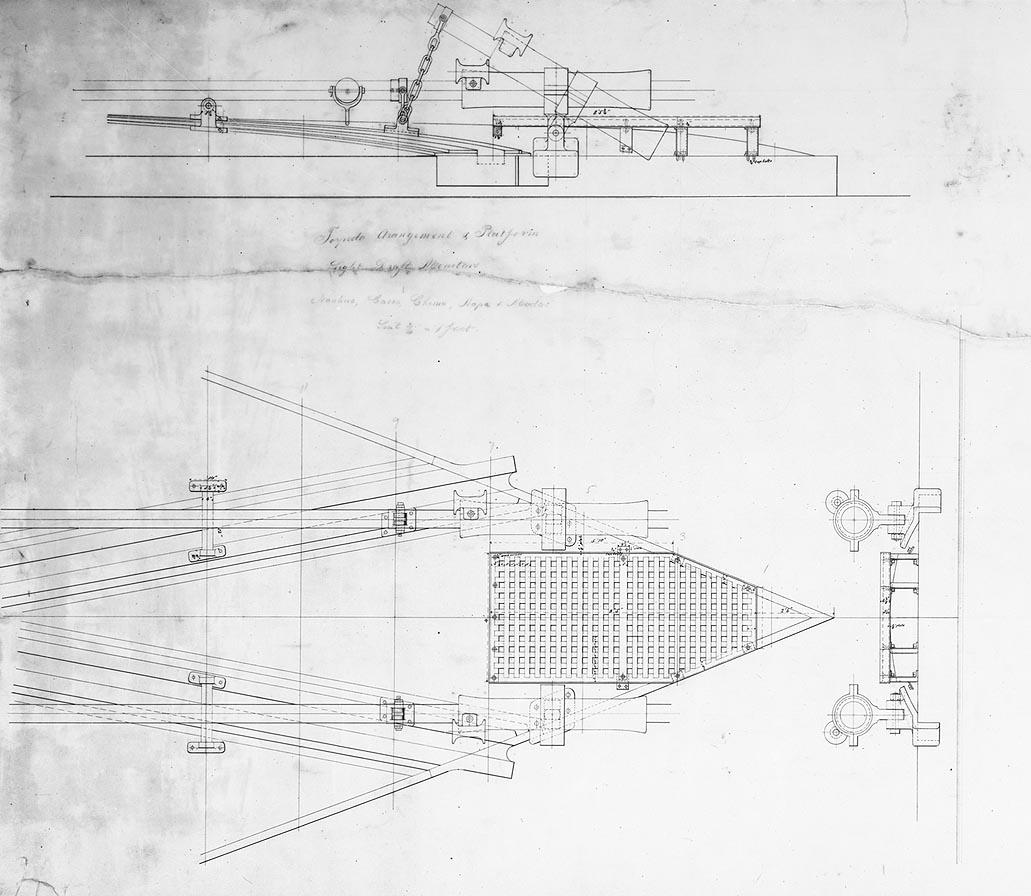
The plans for the torpedo mechanism on the modified Casco-class monitors.
