= USS Chimo (1864) =

Torpedo boat of the United States Navy

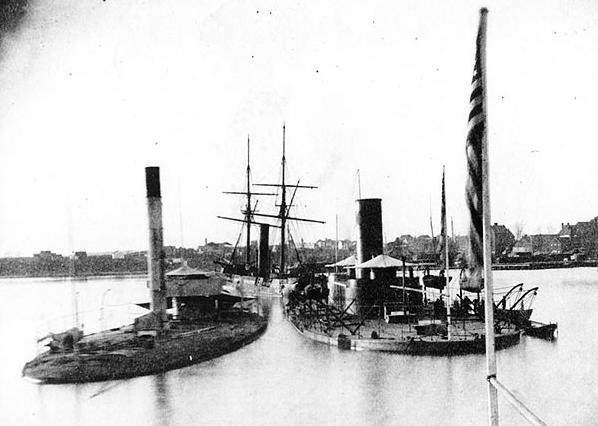
- USS Chimo and USS Tonawanda. Beyond them is the ex-CSS Stonewall. Circa 1865–66

History

United States
- Name: USS Chimo
- Ordered: April 1863
- Builder: Aquila Adams Co.
- Cost: ~$500,000
- Launched: 5 May 1864
- Commissioned: 20 January 1865
- Decommissioned: 24 June 1865
- Fate: Sold, 1874

General characteristics
- Class & type: Casco-class light-draft monitor
- Tonnage: 1,175 tons
- Length: 225 ft
- Beam: 45 ft
- Draft: 9 ft
- Propulsion: Screw steamer
- Speed: 9 knots
- Complement: 65 officers and enlisted
- Armament: 1 × 11 in Dahlgren Smoothbore gun, 1 × spar torpedo
- Armor: Turret 8", pilothouse 10", hull 3", deck 3"

USS Chimo, a single-turreted, twin-screw monitor, was built by the Aquila Adams company in South Boston, Massachusetts, and launched 5 May 1864, and commissioned 20 January 1865.

Chimo was a Casco-class, light-draft monitor intended for service in the shallow bays, rivers, and inlets of the Confederacy. These warships sacrificed armor plate for a shallow draft and were fitted with a ballast compartment designed to lower them in the water during battle.

== Design revisions ==
Though the original designs for the Casco-class monitors were drawn by John Ericsson, the final revision was created by Chief Engineer Alban C. Stimers following Rear Admiral Samuel F. Du Pont's failed bombardment of Fort Sumter in 1863. By the time that the plans were put before the Monitor Board in New York City, Ericsson and Simers had a poor relationship, and Chief of the Bureau of Construction and Repair John Lenthall had little connection to the board. This resulted in the plans being approved and 20 vessels ordered without serious scrutiny of the new design. $14 million US was allocated for the construction of these vessels. It was discovered that Stimers had failed to compensate for the armor his revisions added to the original plan and this resulted in excessive stress on the wooden hull frames and a freeboard of only 3 inches. Stimers was removed from the control of the project and Ericsson was called in to undo the damage. He was forced to raise the hulls of the monitors under construction by nearly two feet and the first few completed vessels had their turrets removed and a single pivot-mount 11 inch Dahlgren cannon mounted. These same few vessels had a retractable spar torpedo added as well. The ironclads of this class were considered of poor design. Only eight were completed by the war's end, none of them seeing action.

== End of Civil War and sale ==
As a result, the Chimo sailed for New York, arriving 26 January 1865, to be refitted with the torpedo gear. On 1 April 1865 she departed for Hampton Roads where she arrived on the 9th. On 28 April she sailed for Point Lookout, NC, where she served as a station ship until 28 May 1865. Arriving at Washington Navy Yard 7 June 1865, she was decommissioned 24 June 1865. Her name was changed to Orion 15 June 1869; to Piscataqua 10 August 1869, and she was sold in 1874.

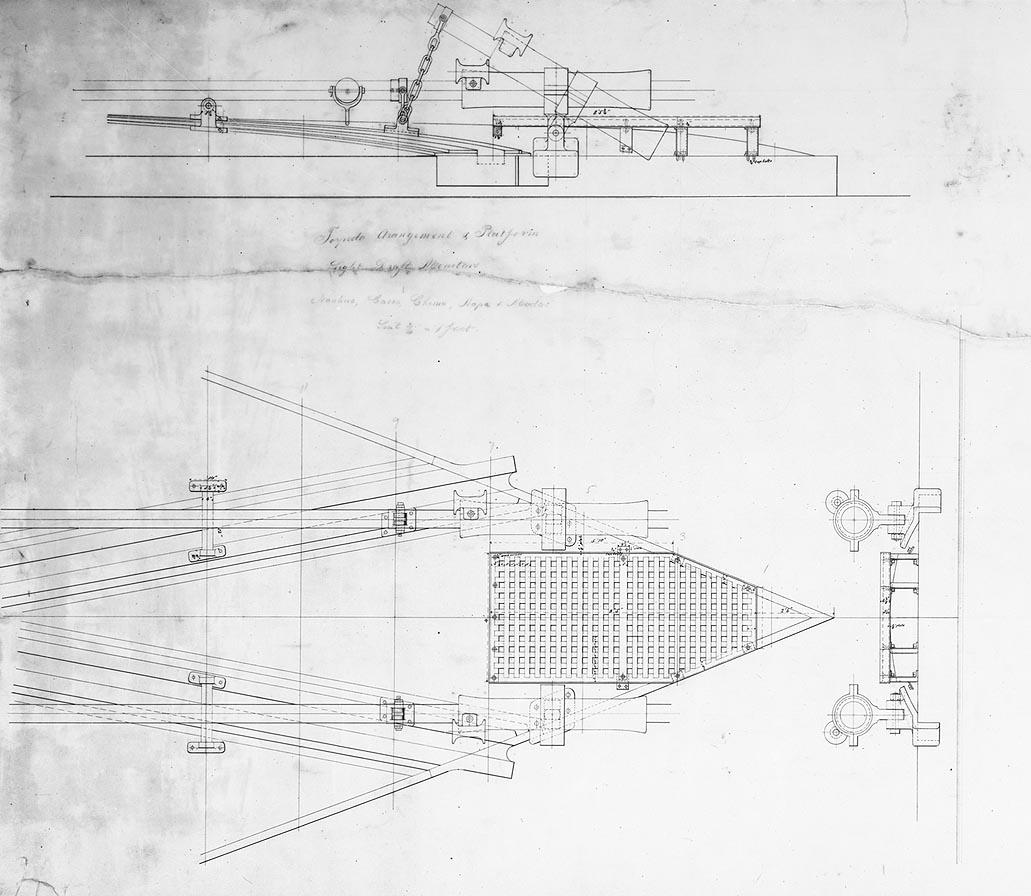
The plans for the torpedo mechanism on the modified Casco-Class monitors.

== See also ==
- See USS Orion for other ships of this name.
- See USS Piscataqua for other ships of this name.
