= Alban C. Stimers =

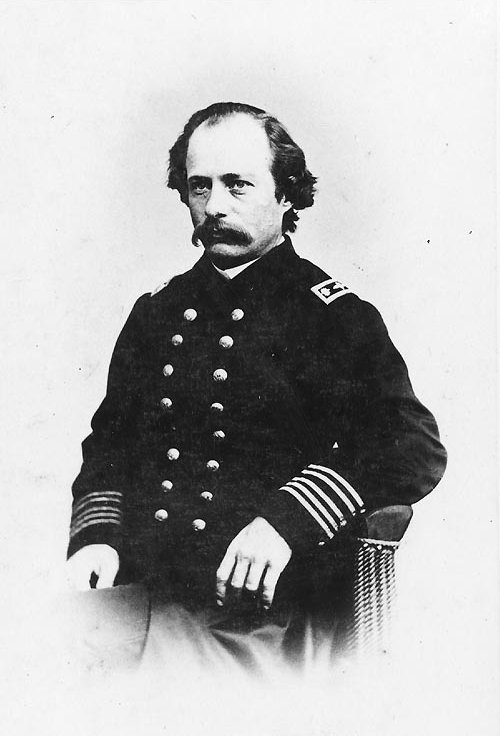
- Alban C. Stimers by Frederick Gutekunst, 1864
- Born: June 5, 1827; New York
- Died: June 3, 1876 (aged 48)
- Military career
- Allegiance: United States of America; Union
- Branch: United States Navy
- Service years: 1845–1865
- Rank: Chief Engineer
- Conflicts: American Civil War
- Other work: Civilian engineer

Alban Crocker Stimers (June 5, 1827 – June 3, 1876) was a chief engineer with the United States Navy. He assisted with the design of the Navy's first ironclad, the USS Monitor, and later with the design of the Passaic-class monitors. His later career was marred by the scandal which enveloped the Casco-class monitors after they were found to be unseaworthy.

== Career ==
Stimers was born in New York in 1827. He entered the Navy as a Third Assistant Engineer in January 1849 and became a chief engineer in July 1858. He served in the steam frigate Roanoke during the early months of the Civil War and later in 1861 was assigned to work with John Ericsson on the construction of the ironclad turret ship Monitor. Though not formally a member of Monitor's complement, Stimers took part in her difficult voyage from New York to Hampton Roads, Virginia, and served on board during her historic battle with the Confederate ironclad CSS Virginia on 9 March 1862. Much of the success of these two operations was due to his inspired work, and Chief Engineer Stimers continued an intimate association with the Navy's ironclad shipbuilding program for much of the rest of the Civil War.

In 1862–63, Stimers again worked with Ericsson during the building of the next class of monitor-type ironclads, the Passaic class. He accompanied these ships during early operations against the Confederacy, most notably the 7 April 1863 bombardment of Fort Sumter, in Charleston Harbor, South Carolina, and helped repair them after that action.

Later in the year he was placed in charge of an ambitious project to construct twenty light-draft monitors for use in shallow inland waters. Unfortunately, the displacement calculations made for these ships were badly done. The resulting Casco class turned out to be useless for their intended role and had to be extensively modified. Stimers had inadvertently demonstrated the inherent difficulty of successfully shepherding complex technological endeavors, something that has bedeviled "project managers" from his time to ours.

After the Casco class debacle, Stimers returned to the seagoing Navy. At the beginning of 1865, he was Chief Engineer of the steam frigate Wabash. He resigned from the Navy in August 1865, and became a consultant. He died of smallpox on June 3, 1876, survived by his wife and five children.

== Published works ==
- Levy, Uriah Phillips; Stimers, Alban C. (1862). Manual of Rules and Regulations for Men-of-war. New York: D. Van Nostrand. p. 88. (Google eBook)
