= Casco-class monitor =

American Civil War ironclad monitor class

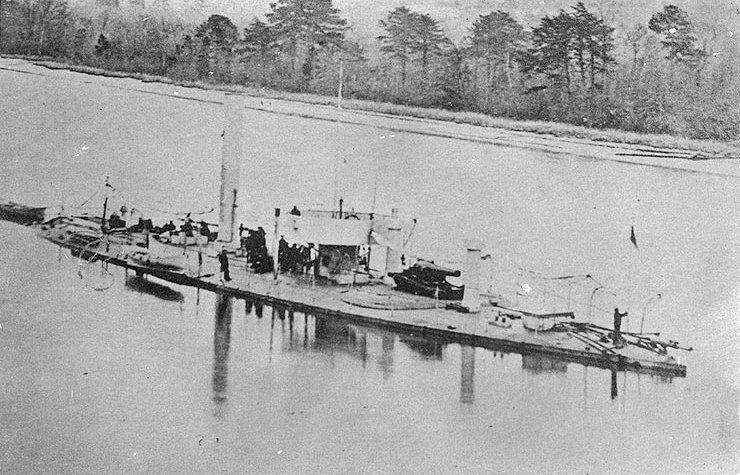
- USS Casco on the James River, 1865

Class overview
- Name: Casco class
- Builders: Various
- Operators: United States Navy
- Preceded by: Passaic class
- Completed: 20
- Retired: 20

General characteristics
- Type: Light draft monitor
- Displacement: 1,175 tons
- Length: 225 ft (69 m)
- Beam: 45 ft (14 m)
- Draft: 6 ft (1.8 m) (designed)
- Propulsion: Steam engine, twin screws
- Speed: 8 knots (15 km/h; 9.2 mph) (designed)
- Armament: 2 × 11 in (280 mm) guns

The Casco-class monitor was a unique class of light draft monitor built on behalf of the United States Navy for the Mississippi theatre during the American Civil War. The largest and most ambitious ironclad program of the war, the project was dogged by delays caused by bureaucratic meddling. Twenty ships of the class were eventually built at great expense, but proved so unseaworthy when trialed that they were quickly sidelined, causing a public scandal.

== History ==
After the success of the US Navy's first monitor, USS Monitor, in preventing the Confederate ironclad CSS Virginia from breaking the Union blockade at Hampton Roads in the spring of 1862, the navy became enthused with the monitor concept (at the expense of the larger broadside ironclad type), and ordered a number of new classes of monitor, one of which was the Casco class. The Cascos were a unique "light draft" class designed specifically for operating in the shallow bays, rivers, and inlets of the Confederacy.

The specifications for the Casco class originally called for a vessel with a light draft, not exceeding six feet, and a low freeboard to present the smallest possible target to Confederate guns. For the design of the new class, the Navy turned once again to John Ericsson, designer of USS Monitor.

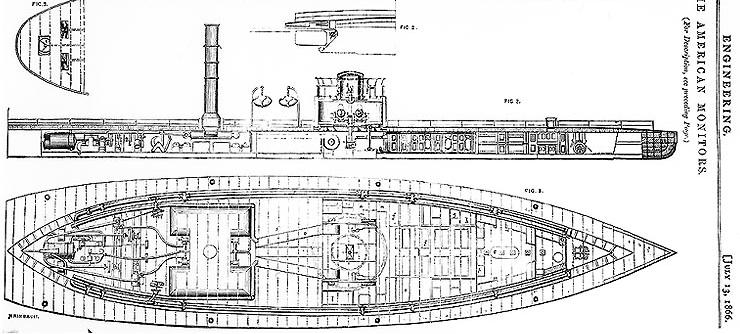
Diagram of USS Nausett, showing the large wooden "raft" surrounding the iron hull

Ericsson came up with a design for a 225-foot (69 m)-long vessel with a single revolving turret containing two 11-inch (280 mm) guns, an armored upper deck, and twin screw propellers giving a top speed of around eight knots. Around the hull of the vessel, a large wooden "raft" was to be constructed, which would help increase buoyancy. Ericsson kept the design deliberately simple in keeping with the inexperience of the private shipyards which would be called upon to build them. He anticipated that each ship would take no more than forty days to complete.

=== The monitor office ===
At around the same time however, the Navy created a new "monitor office" to centralize oversight of the new monitor program. The new office, located across the hall from Ericsson's design bureau, was nominally headed by Rear Admiral Francis H. Gregory, but was effectively run by Chief Engineer Alban C. Stimers, to whom was entrusted the power of setting general plans and ship specifications. Stimers, an ambitious man, was keen to take credit for the design of the new monitors and frequently visited Ericsson's bureau to make changes to the specifications.

The greatest single alteration to the design however, came not directly from Stimers but from Admiral Joseph Smith, chief of the Bureau of Yards and Docks in Washington, D.C., who suggested that the oval hull of the ship be surrounded by large iron tanks which could be pumped full of water in order to lower the ship's freeboard still further when in combat to present an even smaller target, or drained for normal travel. Stimers liked the idea and ordered the changes, but when Ericsson saw the new plans he resigned from the project. The new plans greatly added to the design's complexity, requiring sophisticated pumping mechanisms, while the added weight would also reduce speed and buoyancy.

=== More design changes ===
In February 1863 the monitor office offered contracts for twenty of the new Casco-class monitors, in spite of the fact that the original architect, Ericsson, had not approved the new design. Winning bidders included prominent firms like Reaney, Son & Archbold in Chester, Pennsylvania, Wilcox & Whitney at Camden, Harlan & Hollingsworth in Wilmington, Delaware and Merrick & Sons of Philadelphia (the latter of whom subcontracted much of the work to William Cramp & Sons). A number of smaller firms were also contracted. The cost was estimated at $395,000 per ship, or approximately $8 million in total. Some shipyards, such as Cramp, were forced to substantially upgrade their ironworking facilities for the production of the new vessels.

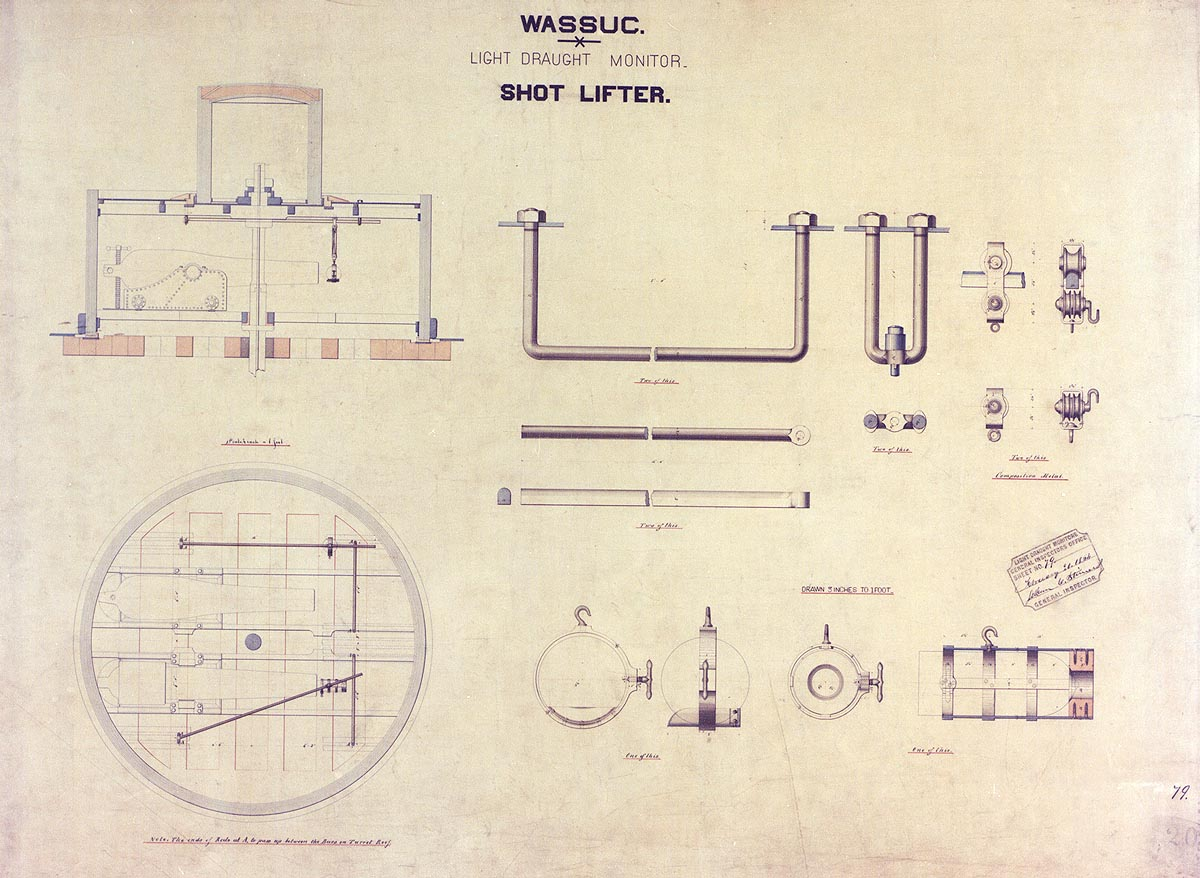
Detail drawing by Stimers for one of the Casco-class monitors

By the end of 1863, frequent design changes were causing growing problems for the contractors. Stimers and his team of thirty draftsmen at the monitor office continued to submit changes even as the vessels were in the process of production, leading to long delays. One yard in Boston received a total of 83 drawings and 120 letters of explanation from Stimers, and the specification manual for the ships grew to 92 pages of small print. The final design called for a total of thirteen auxiliary engines and pumps per ship, fancy brasswork in place of cast iron, and a complex system of pipes for draining and filling the water tanks. The added weight to a ship designed with only a 15-inch (380 mm) freeboard at the outset raised questions about the ships' eventual seaworthiness.

=== Scandal and inquiry ===
By spring of 1864, the first of the Casco-class vessels, USS Chimo, was ready for her initial trial. Putting to sea, waves washed across the deck, while the stern remained totally submerged by three or four inches (10 cm). A second trial, of USS Tunxis, confirmed the disaster, with waves washing over the deck and the ship only able to make a speed of 3½ knots as opposed to the original specification of eight. Moreover, the trials were conducted "light", without the normal operational loads of coal, ammunition and stores. The ships were unseaworthy and virtually useless.

By this stage, the twenty vessels, in various stages of completion, had cost half a million dollars apiece. Amid public scandal, the Navy set up an inquiry. Stimers was found responsible and removed from his post, and the Navy appointed experienced administrators in his place. The vessels were redesigned and refitted in order to improve buoyancy, but few of them saw active service before the end of the war and those that did were decommissioned and laid up within months, while the majority were never commissioned at all. Within a few years, all the ships of the Casco class had been retired and scrapped or otherwise disposed of.

== Ships ==
Construction data
Ship name	Builder	Contracted	Launched	*Commissioned **Completed	Turret removed?	Renamed	Fate
USS Casco	Atlantic Iron Works, Boston	14 April 1863	7 May 1864	*4 December 1864	Yes	Hero, 15 June 1869	Scrapped, 1875
USS Chimo	Aquilla Adams, South Boston	17 May 1863	5 May 1864	*20 January 1865	Yes	Orion, 15 June 1869; Piscataqua, 10 August 1869	Sold for scrap, 1874
USS Cohoes	Continental Iron Works, Greenpoint, Brooklyn	17 April 1863	31 May 1865	**19 January 1866	No	Charybdis, 15 June 1869; Cohoes, 10 August 1869	Sold for scrap, July 1874
USS Etlah	Charles W. McCord, St. Louis	24 June 1863	3 July 1865	**12 March 1866	No	Hecate, 15 June 1869; Etlah, 10 August 1869	Sold for scrap, 12 September 1874
USS Klamath	Alexander Swift, Cincinnati	26 March 1863	20 April 1865	**6 May 1866	No	Harpy, 15 June 1869; Klamath, 10 August 1869	Sold for scrap, 12 September 1874
USS Koka	Wilcox & Whiting, Camden, New Jersey	24 April 1863	18 May 1865	**28 November 1865	No	Argos, 15 June 1869; Koka, 10 August 1869	Sold for scrap, 2 October 1874
USS Modoc	J.H. Underbill, Brooklyn	4 June 1863	21 March 1865	**23 June 1865	Yes	Achilles, 15 June 1869; Modoc, 10 August 1869	Sold for scrap, August 1875
USS Napa	Harlan & Hollingsworth, Wilmington, Delaware	2 March 1863	26 November 1864	**4 May 1865	Yes	Nemesis, 15 June 1869; Napa, 10 August 1869	Sold for scrap, 1875
USS Naubuc	Union Iron Works, Brooklyn	2 April 1863	19 October 1864	*27 March 1865	Yes	Gorgon, 15 June 1869; Minnetonka, 10 August 1869	Sold for scrap, 1875
USS Nausett	Donald McKay, Boston	10 June 1863	26 April 1865	*10 August 1865	No	Aetna, 15 June 1869; Nausett, 10 August 1869	Sold for scrap, August 1875
USS Shawnee	Curtis & Tilden, Boston	2 April 1863	13 March 1865	*18 August 1865	No	Eolus, 15 June 1869; Shawnee, 10 August 1869	Sold for scrap, 9 September 1875
USS Shiloh	Charles W. McCord, St. Louis	24 June 1863	14 July 1865	**12 March 1866	No	Iris, 15 June 1869; Shiloh, 10 August 1869	Sold for scrap, 1874
USS Squando	Donald McKay, Boston	4 May 1863	31 December 1864	*6 June 1865	No	Erebus, 15 June 1869; Algoma, 10 August 1869	Scrapped, 1874
USS Suncook	Globe Works, South Boston	17 March 1863	1 February 1865	*27 July 1865	No	Spitfire, 15 June 1869; Suncook, 10 August 1869	Scrapped, July 1874
USS Tunxis	Reaney, Son & Archbold, Chester, Pennsylvania	9 March 1863	4 June 1864	*12 July 1864	No	Hydra, 15 June 1869; Otsego, 10 August 1869	Sold for scrap, 1874
USS Umpqua	Snowden & Mason, Brownsville, Pennsylvania	4 March 1863	21 December 1865	**7 May 1866	No	Fury, 15 June 1869; Umpqua, 10 August 1869	Sold for scrap, 12 September 1874
USS Wassuc	George W. Lawrence, Portland, Maine	2 June 1863	25 July 1865	**28 October 1865	No	Stromboli, 15 June 1869; Wassuc, 10 August 1869	Sold for scrap, 9 September 1875
USS Waxsaw	A. & W. Denmead & Son, Baltimore	13 March 1863	4 May 1865	**21 October 1866	No	Niobe, 15 June 1869; Waxsaw, 10 August 1869	Sold for scrap, 25 August 1875
USS Yazoo	Merrick & Sons, Philadelphia	2 March 1863	8 May 1865	**15 December 1865	No	Tartar, 15 June 1869; Yazoo, 10 August 1869	Sold for scrap, 5 September 1874
USS Yuma	Alexander Swift, Cincinnati	26 March 1863	30 May 1865	**6 May 1866	No	Tempest, 15 June 1869; Yuma, 10 August 1869	Sold for scrap, 12 September 1874
