= League Island =

Island in the Delaware River, Pennsylvania, US

Coordinates: 39°53′26″N 75°10′34″W

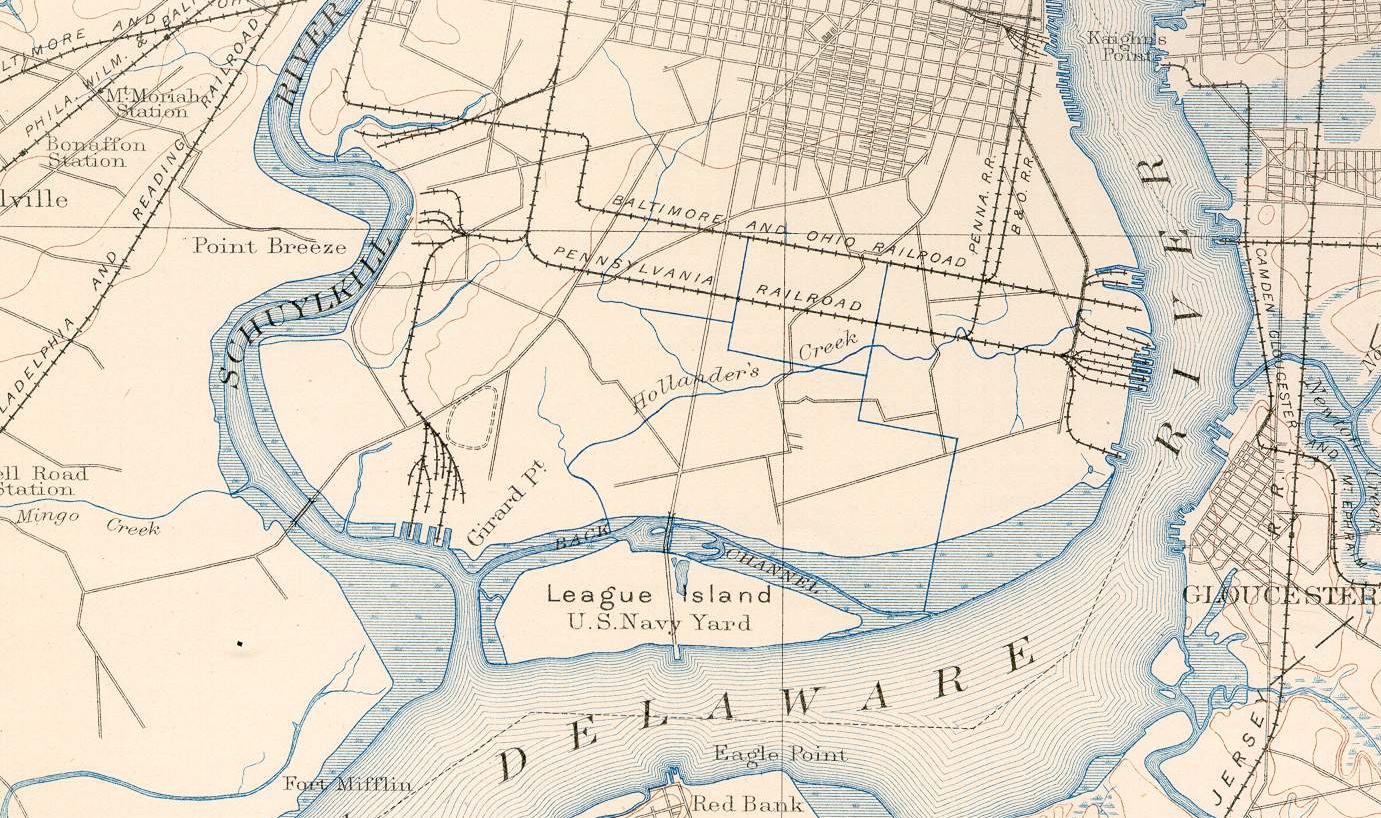
1891 USGS Topographic Map showing League Island at the confluence of the Schuylkill and Delaware Rivers

League Island was an island in the Delaware River, part of the city of Philadelphia, just upstream from the mouth of the Schuylkill River. The island was developed as the Philadelphia Naval Shipyard. Since the late 20th century, it has been redeveloped and now operates primarily as an industrial park under the name "The Navy Yard".

League Island no longer exists as an island, since the Back Channel, which separated it from the mainland, was closed at the eastern end to create land for Mustin Field, a military airfield. This was closed in 1963. The western end of the channel became the present Reserve Basin, which holds the ships of the U.S. Navy's reserve fleet.
