= John Lenthall (shipbuilder) =

American shipbuilder (1807–1882)

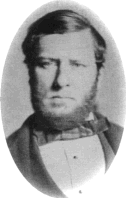
- Born: 16 September 1807; Washington, D.C., U.S.
- Died: 11 April 1882 (aged 74); Washington, D.C., U.S.
- Resting place: Rock Creek Cemetery; Washington, D.C., U.S.
- Occupations: Naval architect and shipbuilder
- Years active: 1823–1871
- Employer: United States Department of the Navy

John Lenthall (16 September 1807 – 11 April 1882) was an American shipbuilder and naval architect. He was responsible for the construction and repair of United States Navy ships during the American Civil War (1861–1865), as well as in the years immediately before and after it. His career spanned the U.S. Navy's transition from sail to steam propulsion and from wooden ships to ironclads, and in retirement he participated in early planning for an eventual steel navy.

== Early life ==
John Lenthall was born in Washington, D.C., on 16 September 1807, the son of John Lenthall and Mary King Lenthall. His British-born father was an architect who had emigrated to the United States in 1793 and from 1803 worked as Clerk of the Works and Principal Surveyor at the United States Capitol Building in Washington under Architect of the Capitol Benjamin Henry Latrobe, serving as the building's construction superintendent. The senior John Lenthall died in a construction accident in the building's north wing in September 1808 when he prematurely removed props holding up the vaulted ceiling in what is now known as the Old Supreme Court Chamber and was crushed to death when the ceiling collapsed.

== Career ==
=== Washington Navy Yard ===
The younger John Lenthall began his career in 1823, when as a teenager he became an employee of the United States Department of the Navy at the Washington Navy Yard in Washington, D.C., where his father had once worked as Superintendent of Shipwrights. He learned the trade of ship carpenter and received training in Europe, visiting shipyards in the United Kingdom, France, Denmark, and the Russian Empire,

=== Philadelphia Navy Yard ===
Around 1827, Lenthall became the apprentice of Samuel Humphreys; Humphreys had become Chief Constructor of the Navy in 1826 while retaining his position as the Naval Constructor at the Philadelphia Navy Yard in Philadelphia, Pennsylvania, where he continued to spend most of his time. Humphreys took on all the design work at the navy yard himself, and Lenthall worked closely with him and excelled as his assistant and draftsman. Lenthall also was exposed to the work of the noted naval architect William Doughty.

Humphreys nominated Lenthall to become an assistant naval constructor at the Philadelphia Navy Yard in 1828. With Humphreys monopolizing naval ship design, Lenthall and his fellow constructors and assistant constructors occupied at least some of their time with designing merchant ships, and papers survive from the Philadelphia shipbuilding firm of John Lenthall and Company.

Various sources state that Lenthall "entered" the U.S. Navy on 1 May 1835, but none provide any further information on any career he had as a naval officer. He continued to work mainly at the Philadelphia Navy Yard through the 1830s and 1840s, and by about 1860 was referred to as a civilian employee of the Navy and as "Mr. Lenthall," so any career he had in uniform appears to have ended by that time.

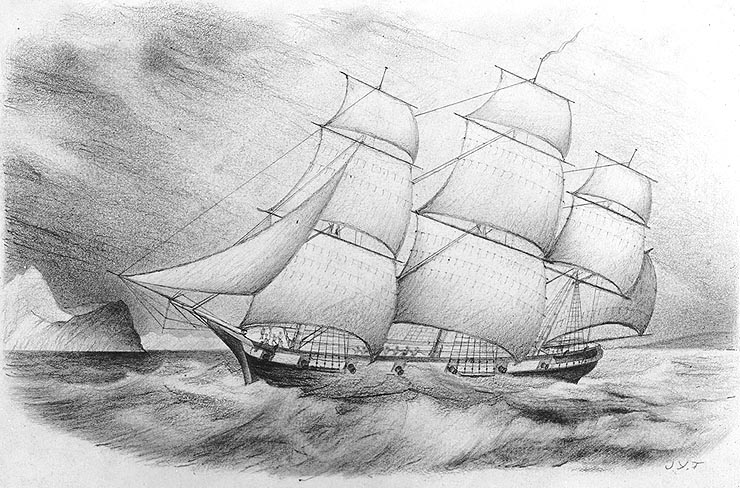
USS Decatur.

Surviving papers from the 1830s demonstrate that Lenthall was well informed about the latest ship design theories of the era and used extensive calculations in his design work. Under his superintendence at Philadelphia the first American first-rate ship-of-the-line, USS Pennsylvania, was completed and the supply ship USS Relief was built. He was promoted from assistant naval constructor to naval constructor on 21 July 1838, and in that year he appears to have been solely responsible, albeit in consultation with Humphreys, for the design of a particularly handsome and popular class of sloops-of-war made up of USS Decatur, USS Dale, USS Marion, USS Preble, and USS Yorktown. He also continued his commercial endeavors, designing ships for Philadelphia merchants, including packet ships for the famous Cape Line. In the early 1840s he completed his efforts to refine the plans of the sailing frigate USS Raritan, laid down in 1820 but not launched until 1843, and she emerged as a speedy ship for her day. In the mid-1840s he designed the sloop-of-war USS Germantown, renowned as a fast sailer, particularly in light winds.

In 1843, he was elected to the American Philosophical Society.

=== Chief Constructor of the Navy ===
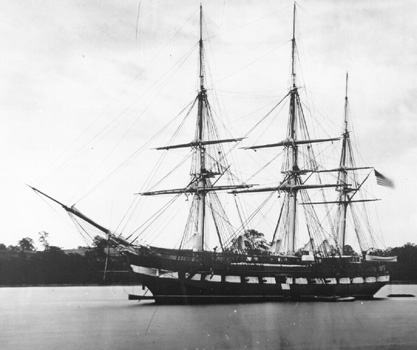
USS Constellation of 1854, effectively a new ship John Lenthall designed to rebuild the earlier USS Constellation of 1797.

Lenthall left the Philadelphia Navy Yard to become Chief Constructor of the Navy in Washington, D.C., in 1849, replacing Francis Grice. As the steamship era dawned, he appears to have been one of the more forward-looking naval architects of his time when it came to his interest in the adaptation of steam propulsion to naval ships.

During his tenure as Chief Constructor, he handled the matter of the reconstruction of the sailing frigate USS Constellation of 1797, drydocked in 1853 in poor condition after languishing in ordinary at Gosport Navy Yard in Portsmouth, Virginia, since 1845. The ship was rebuilt into a sloop-of-war. This would lead a century later to a controversy over the identity of the newer ship, with some researchers arguing that she was an entirely new ship with no connection to the old.

=== Chief of the Bureau of Construction and Repair ===
In 1853, Lenthall became chief of the Navy's Bureau of Construction, Equipment, and Repair – known after an 1862 reorganization as the Bureau of Construction and Repair – in Washington, D.C., the position he held until his retirement 18 years later. During his tenure as chief of the bureau he was responsible for the design of some of the most significant U.S. Navy ships constructed in the years just prior to the onset of the American Civil War. Among them was the wooden steam frigate USS Merrimack, which the Confederate States of America later seized and converted into the ironclad CSS Virginia – famously the opponent of the U.S. Navy monitor USS Monitor in the Battle of Hampton Roads, the first clash between ironclads. Another Lenthall design of the period was the wooden steam frigate USS Roanoke, which the U.S. Navy converted during the Civil War into a three-turret ironclad monitor – the world's first ship with more than two gun turrets – under the direction of Lenthall and the Engineer-in-Chief of the Navy, Benjamin F. Isherwood.

=== American Civil War ===
Lenthall initially expressed little personal interest in the design of ironclads, referring to them as "humbug" and writing in a letter to Captain Samuel Francis Du Pont in February 1861 that ironclads instead should be built by "some of these young, smart, modern improvement, spirit of the age fellows." He also expressed skepticism about the efficacy of John Ericsson's revolutionary design of the monitor USS Monitor, expressing the view that Monitor would sink as soon as she was launched. After the outbreak of the Civil War in April 1861, however, the United States Department of War sought Lenthall's help in designing shallow-draft warships for United States Army use in riverine warfare operations against Confederate forces. With his experience limited to deeper-draft seagoing ships, Lenthall doubted that a shallow-draft ship could house a successful steam propulsion plant, but he nonetheless drew up a preliminary design for a 170-foot (52 m) warship with a beam of 28 feet (8.5 m) and a draft of only 5 feet (1.5 m) before passing it along to Samuel M. Pook and James Buchanan Eads so that he could devote his own time to ocean-going ships. Pook and Eads in turn modified Lenthall's design to produce the first American ironclad warships, the seven City-class ironclad gunboats that served on rivers in what is now the central United States as the core of the U.S. Army's Western Gunboat Flotilla, later transferred to the U.S. Navy as the Mississippi River Squadron.

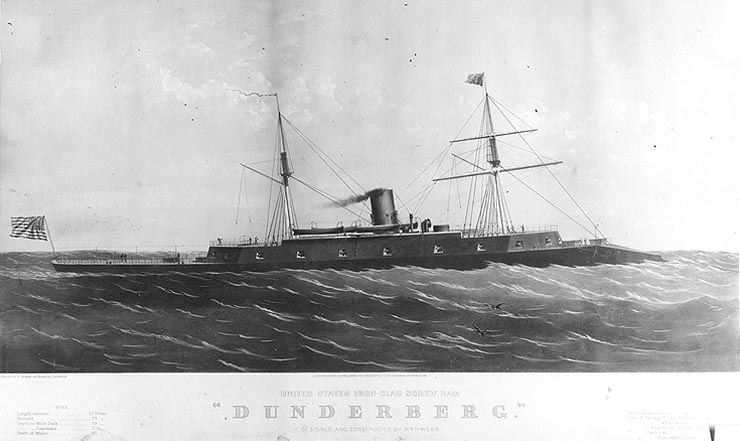
An 1865 illustration of USS Dunderberg.

Despite Lenthall's initial lack of interest in ironclads, the Bureau of Construction and Repair oversaw the design and construction of monitors and other ironclads under his direction during the Civil War, and Lenthall himself designed the ironclad monitors of the successful Miantonomoh class. Early in the Civil War, Lenthall also designed the revolutionary USS Dunderberg, an ocean-going ironclad steam frigate intended to fight the British Royal Navy should war break out with the United Kingdom. At 377 feet (115 m), Dunderberg was the longest wooden ship ever built. She was still incomplete at the end of the Civil War in April 1865, by which time the threat of war with Britain had long since receded. Built of poor materials and not completed until 1867, Dunderberg was unsuccessful and the U.S. Navy rejected her for service, but her design made a great impression worldwide and was influential among foreign naval architects. France bought Dunderberg in 1867 to prevent Prussia from acquiring her, and she served briefly in the French Navy as Rochambeau.

== Later life ==
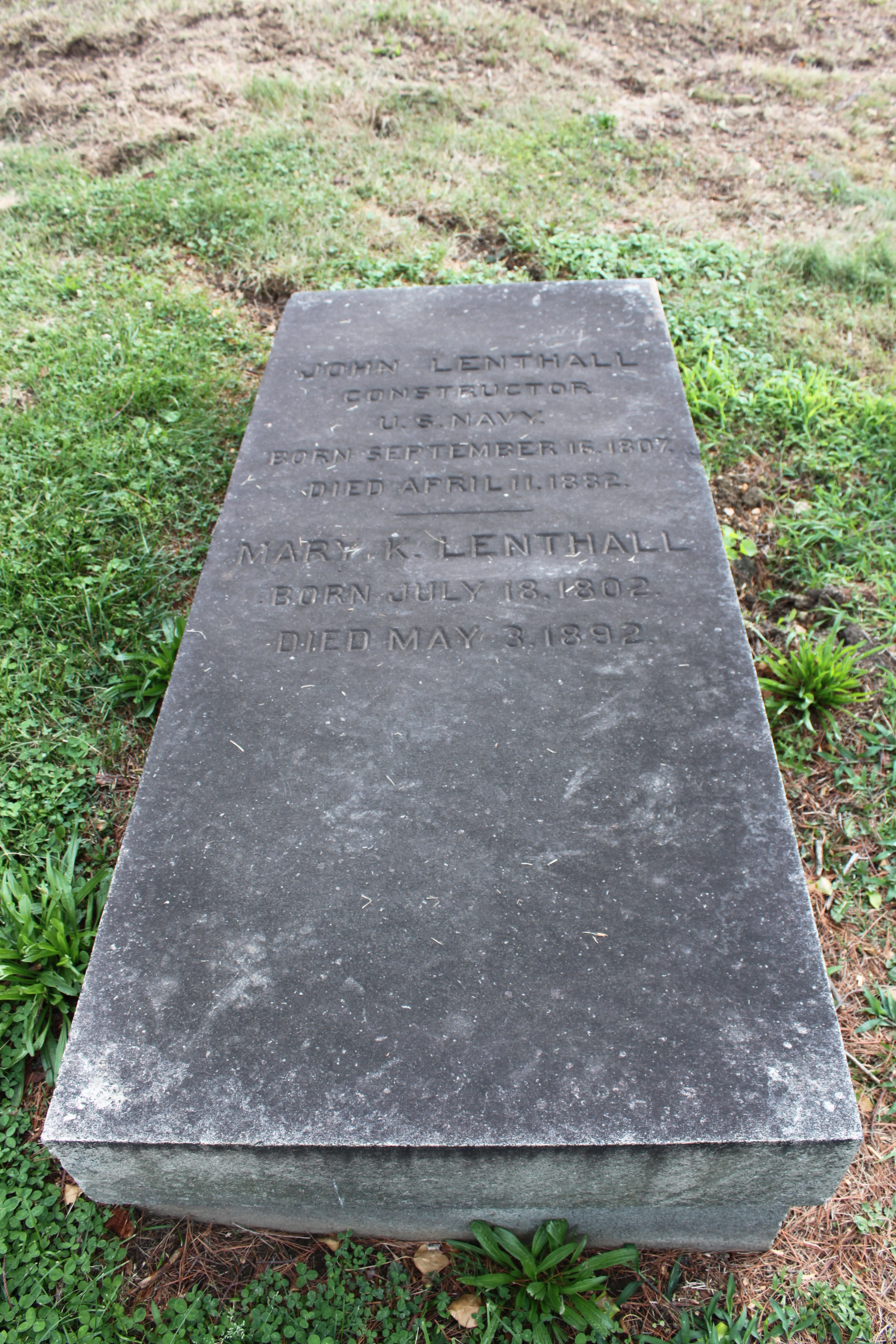
Grave of Lenthall at Rock Creek Cemetery

Lenthall retired in 1871. He remained active in retirement, serving on a board which advised the U.S. Navy on new ship design and construction at a time when the Navy was making a transition from wooden and iron ships to the construction of the modern steel navy which would begin to appear in the 1880s.

Lenthall died suddenly in Washington, D.C., on 11 April 1882. He is buried in Rock Creek Cemetery in Washington, D.C.

== Commemoration ==
One U.S. Navy ship, the fleet replenishment oiler USNS John Lenthall (T-AO-189), has been named for John Lenthall.
