= USS Wyandotte (1864) =

Canonicus-class monitor

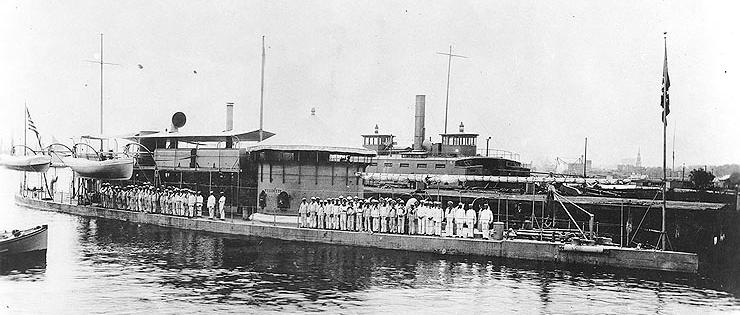
- Wyandotte at the Boston Navy Yard during the Spanish–American War

History

United States
- Name: USS Wyandotte
- Namesake: Wyandotte Indian Tribe
- Ordered: 15 September 1862
- Builder: Miles Greenwood
- Laid down: 28 September 1862
- Launched: 22 December 1864
- Completed: 15 February 1866
- Commissioned: 24 January 1876
- Decommissioned: 20 September 1898
- Renamed: USS Vesuvius, 15 June 1869; USS Wyandotte, 10 August 1869
- Refit: 1873–74
- Fate: Sold for scrap, 17 January 1899

General characteristics
- Class & type: Canonicus-class monitor
- Displacement: 2,100 long tons (2,100 t)
- Tons burthen: 1,034 tons (bm)
- Length: 224 ft 6 in (68.4 m)
- Beam: 43 ft 5 in (13.2 m)
- Draft: 13 ft 3 in (4.0 m)
- Installed power: 320 ihp (240 kW); 2 × Stimers fire-tube boilers
- Propulsion: 1 × Propeller; 1 × Vibrating-lever steam engine
- Speed: 8 knots (15 km/h; 9.2 mph)
- Complement: 100 officers and enlisted men
- Armament: 2 × 15-inch (381 mm) smoothbore Dahlgren guns
- Armor: Gun turret: 10 in (254 mm); Waterline belt: 5 in (127 mm); Deck: 1.5 in (38 mm); Pilot house: 10 in (254 mm)

Originally named USS Tippecanoe, after the river in Indiana, USS Wyandotte was a single-turreted Canonicus-class monitor built for the Union Navy during the American Civil War. Completed after the end of the war, Wyandotte was laid up until 1876, although she received her new name in 1869. The ship was commissioned in 1876 and assigned to the North Atlantic Squadron for the next three years. She became a receiving ship in 1879 until she was placed in reserve again in 1885. Wyandotte was on militia duty when the Spanish–American War began and she was recommissioned in 1898 to defend Boston, Massachusetts from any Spanish raiders. The ship was decommissioned after the end of the war and sold for scrap in 1899.

== Description and construction ==
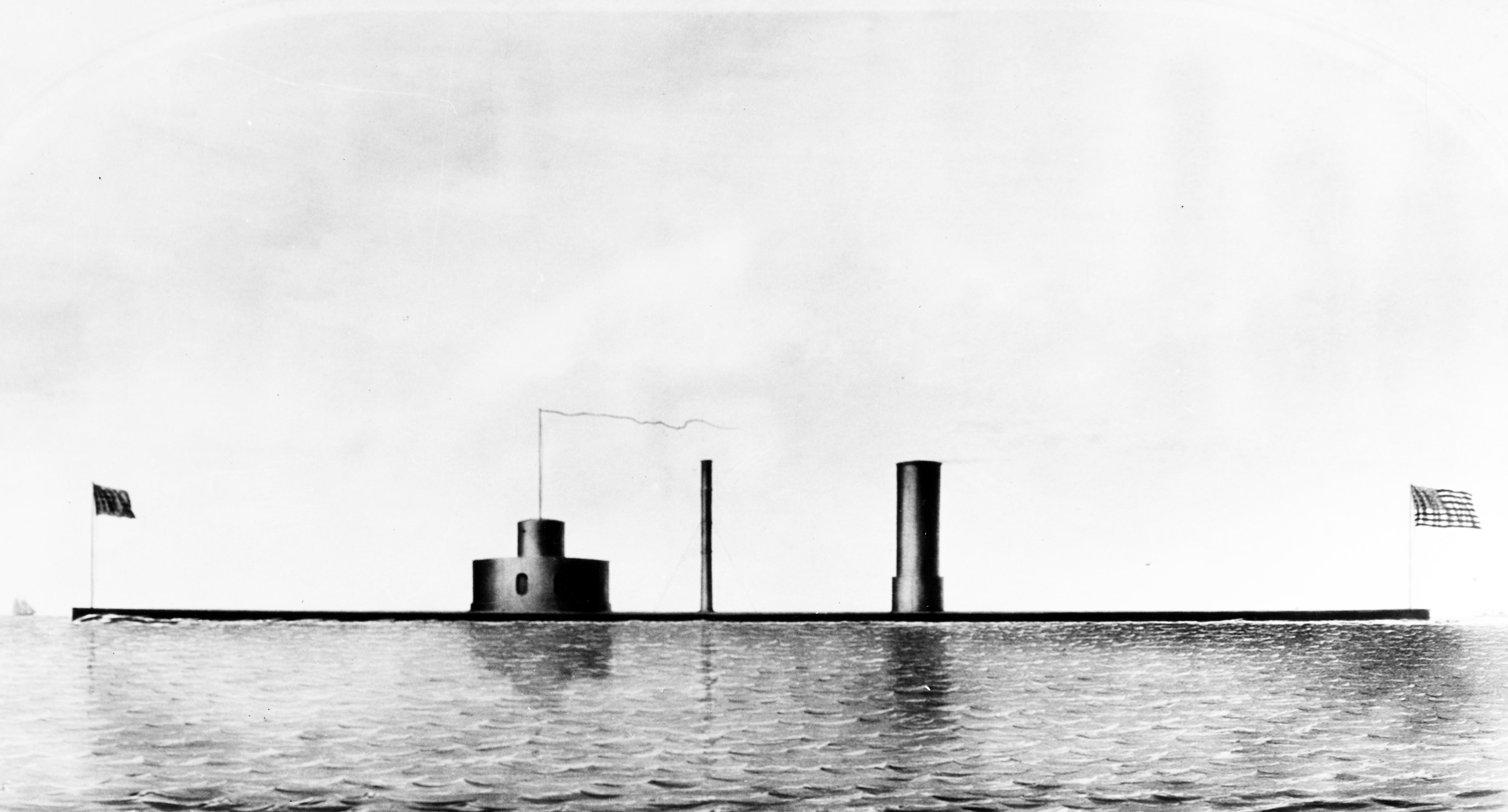
Tippecanoe as originally constructed

The ship was 224 feet 6 inches (68.4 m) long overall, had a beam of 43 feet 5 inches (13.2 m) and had a maximum draft of 13 feet 3 inches (4.0 m). Wyandotte had a tonnage of 1,034 tons burthen and displaced 2,100 long tons (2,100 t). Her crew consisted of 100 officers and enlisted men.

Wyandotte was powered by a two-cylinder horizontal vibrating-lever steam engine that drove one propeller using steam generated by two Stimers horizontal fire-tube boilers. The 320-indicated-horsepower (240 kW) engine gave the ship a top speed of 8 knots (15 km/h; 9.2 mph). She carried 140–150 long tons (140–150 t) of coal. Wyandotte's main armament consisted of two smoothbore, muzzle-loading, 15-inch (381 mm) Dahlgren guns mounted in a single gun turret. Each gun weighed approximately 43,000 pounds (20,000 kg). They could fire a 350-pound (158.8 kg) shell up to a range of 2,100 yards (1,900 m) at an elevation of +7°.

The exposed sides of the hull were protected by five layers of 1-inch (25 mm) wrought iron plates, backed by wood. The armor of the gun turret and the pilot house consisted of ten layers of one-inch plates. The ship's deck was protected by armor 1.5 inches (38 mm) thick. A 5-by-15-inch (130 by 380 mm) soft iron band was fitted around the base of the turret to prevent shells and fragments from jamming the turret as had happened to several of the older Passaic-class monitors during the First Battle of Charleston Harbor in April 1863. The base of the funnel was protected to a height of 6 feet (1.8 m) by 8 inches (200 mm) of armor. A "rifle screen" of 1/2-inch (13 mm) armor 3 feet (0.9 m) high was installed on the top of the turret to protected the crew against Confederate snipers based on a suggestion by Commander Tunis A. M. Craven, captain of her sister ship Tecumseh. The only known modification after the ship's completion was the addition of a hurricane deck between the turret and the funnel sometime after the end of the Civil War.

The contract for Wyandotte, the only Navy ship to be named after the Wyandotte Indian Tribe, was awarded to Miles Greenwood; the ship was laid down on 28 September 1862 at the shipyard of John Litherbury in Cincinnati, Ohio. She was launched on 22 December 1864 and completed on 15 February 1866. The ship's construction was delayed by multiple changes ordered while she was being built that reflected battle experience with earlier monitors. This included the rebuilding of the turrets and pilot houses to increase their armor thickness from 8 inches (203 mm) to 10 inches and to replace the bolts that secured their armor plates together with rivets to prevent them from being knocked loose by the shock of impact from shells striking the turret. Other changes included deepening the hull by 18 inches (457 mm) to increase the ship's buoyancy, moving the position of the turret to balance the ship's trim and replacing all of the ship's deck armor. Completion of the ship was further delayed by the low depth of the Ohio River which prevented her movement from Cincinnati in December 1864 to finish their fitting out. The river finally rose in March 1865 which allowed the ship to reach New Albany, Indiana on 14 March. Wyandotte was moved to Evansville, Indiana in late May to complete her hull where rudimentary facilities and illness among her workers delayed her construction still further.

The monitor joined her sisters Oneota, Manayunk, and Catawba in ordinary opposite Cairo, Illinois when she was completed on 15 February 1866 although they drew enough water that they had to be anchored in the main channel where they were often struck by debris, drifting ice, and were vulnerable to accidents. Wyandotte's anchor chain was broken on 27 March when she was struck by a steamboat towing barges and the ship collided with Oneota and the two ships were dragged 2 miles (3.2 km) downstream before they could be brought under control. This was a persistent problem and the Navy finally decided to move the ships down to New Orleans in May 1866. In 1869, she was twice renamed, first to Vesuvius on 15 June and then Wyandotte on 10 August.

== Service history ==
The monitor was moved to Key West, Florida in 1870 and then to the Philadelphia Navy Yard by 1872. In 1873–74, Wyandotte was thoroughly overhauled by John Roach & Sons in Chester, Pennsylvania and commissioned for the first time on 24 January 1876, under the command of Lieutenant Thomas C. Terrell. The ship was assigned to the North Atlantic Squadron through 1879 and spent her time on exercises and training cruises; she was based at Hampton Roads, Virginia for a while. She served as the station ship at Washington, D.C., beginning in 1879, before she was again placed in reserve in 1885, first at Richmond, Virginia and then at Norfolk, Virginia.

Wyandotte was transferred to the Connecticut Naval Militia in 1896, and she was recommissioned for local defense duties on 30 April 1898 during the Spanish–American War in response to political pressure. Commanded by Lt. John B. Milton, the ship sailed from New Haven, Connecticut on 17 May, to guard Boston and remained on there from 19 May to 5 September. Wyandotte sailed to Philadelphia, Pennsylvania after the end of the war and arrived there on 9 September. She was decommissioned on 20 September and sold for scrap on 17 January 1899.
