= USS Mahopac (1864) =

Canonicus-class monitor

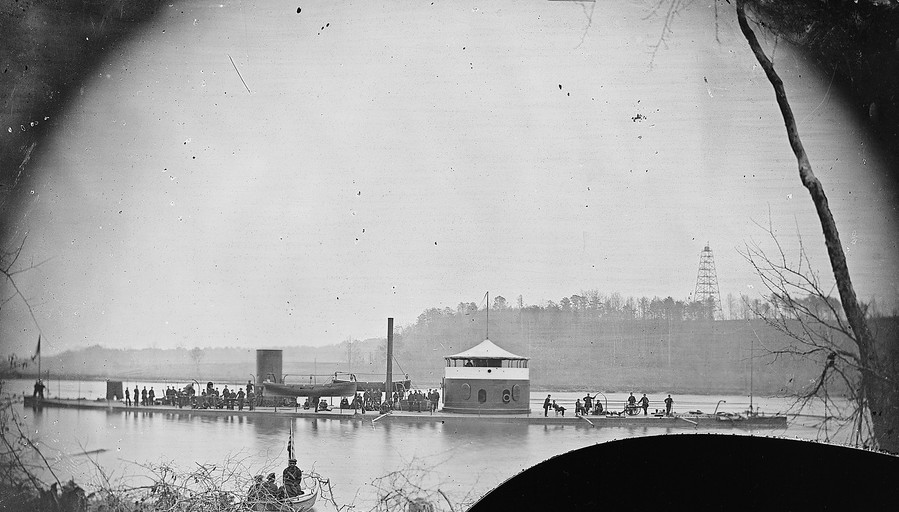
- Mahopac at anchor on the Appomattox River, 1864

History

United States
- Name: USS Mahopac
- Namesake: Lake Mahopac, New York
- Ordered: 15 September 1862
- Builder: Secor & Co., Jersey City, New Jersey
- Cost: $701,624
- Laid down: 1862
- Launched: 17 May 1864
- Commissioned: 22 September 1864
- Decommissioned: June 1865
- Recommissioned: 15 January 1866
- Renamed: Castor, 15 June 1869
- Renamed: Mahopac, 10 August 1869
- Decommissioned: 11 March 1872
- Recommissioned: 21 November 1873
- Out of service: In ordinary 1889–1895
- Stricken: 14 January 1902
- Fate: Sold, 25 March 1902

General characteristics
- Class & type: Canonicus-class monitor
- Displacement: 2,100 long tons (2,100 t)
- Tons burthen: 1,034 tons (bm)
- Length: 225 ft (68.6 m)
- Beam: 43 ft 3 in (13.2 m)
- Draft: 13 ft 6 in (4.1 m)
- Installed power: 320 ihp (240 kW); 2 × Stimers fire-tube boilers
- Propulsion: 1 × Propeller; 1 × Vibrating-lever steam engine
- Speed: 8 knots (15 km/h; 9.2 mph)
- Complement: 100 officers and enlisted men
- Armament: 2 × 15-inch (381 mm) smoothbore Dahlgren guns
- Armor: Gun turret: 10 in (254 mm); Waterline belt: 5 in (127 mm); Deck: 1.5 in (38 mm); Pilot house: 10 in (254 mm)

USS Mahopac (1864) was a Canonicus-class monitor built for the Union Navy during the American Civil War. The vessel was assigned to the James River Flotilla of the North Atlantic Blockading Squadron upon completion in September 1864. The ship spent most of her time stationed up the James River where she could support operations against Richmond and defend against sorties by the Confederate ironclads of the James River Squadron. She engaged Confederate artillery batteries during the year and later participated in both the first and second battles of Fort Fisher, defending the approaches to Wilmington, North Carolina, in December 1864 – January 1865. Mahopac returned to the James River after the capture of Fort Fisher and remained there until Richmond, Virginia was occupied in early April.

A few days later, the monitor was transferred to Washington, D.C. and decommissioned in June and recommissioned in early 1866 for service on the East Coast and in the Caribbean. Mahopac generally remained active until 1889 when she was permanently placed in reserve. She was sold for scrap in 1902.

== Description and construction ==
The ship was 225 feet (68.6 m) long overall, had a beam of 43 feet 3 inches (13.2 m) and had a maximum draft of 13 feet 6 inches (4.1 m). She had a tonnage of 1,034 tons burthen and displaced 2,100 long tons (2,100 t). Her crew consisted of 100 officers and enlisted men.

Mahopac was powered by a two-cylinder horizontal vibrating-lever steam engine that drove one propeller using steam generated by two Stimers horizontal fire-tube boilers. The 320-indicated-horsepower (240 kW) engine gave the ship a top speed of 8 knots (15 km/h; 9.2 mph). She carried 140–150 long tons (140–150 t) of coal. Mahopac's main armament consisted of two smoothbore, muzzle-loading, 15-inch (381 mm) Dahlgren guns mounted in a single gun turret. Each gun weighed approximately 43,000 pounds (20,000 kg). They could fire a 350-pound (158.8 kg) shell up to a range of 2,100 yards (1,900 m) at an elevation of +7°.

The exposed sides of the hull were protected by five layers of one-inch (25 mm) wrought iron plates, backed by wood. The armor of the gun turret and the pilot house consisted of ten layers of one-inch plates. The ship's deck was protected by armor 1.5 inches (38 mm) thick. A 5-by-15-inch (130 by 380 mm) soft iron band was fitted around the base of the turret to prevent shells and fragments from jamming the turret as had happened to earlier monitors during the First Battle of Charleston Harbor in April 1863. The base of the funnel was protected to a height of six feet (1.8 m) by eight inches (203 mm) of armor. A "rifle screen" of 1/2-inch (13 mm) armor three feet (0.9 m) high was installed on the top of the turret to protect the crew against Confederate snipers based on a suggestion by Commander Tunis A. M. Craven, captain of her sister ship Tecumseh.

The contract for Mahopac, named after Lake Mahopac in New York, was awarded to Secor & Co.; the ship was laid down in 1862 by the primary subcontractor Joseph Colwell at his Jersey City, New Jersey shipyard. She was launched on 17 May 1864 and commissioned on 22 September 1864 with Commander William A. Parker in command. The ship's construction was delayed by multiple changes ordered while she was being built that reflected battle experience with earlier monitors. This included the rebuilding of the turrets and pilot houses to increase their armor thickness from 8 inches (203 mm) to 10 inches and to replace the bolts that secured their armor plates together with rivets to prevent them from being knocked loose by the shock of impact from shells striking the turret. Other changes included deepening the hull by 18 inches (457 mm) to increase the ship's buoyancy, moving the position of the turret to balance the ship's trim and replacing all of the ship's deck armor. The ship ultimately cost a total of $701,624, although the builder appealed for recompense for additional costs caused by the government's delays and changes. The case was dismissed on 31 March 1919. No modifications are known to have been made after the ship's completion.

== Service ==
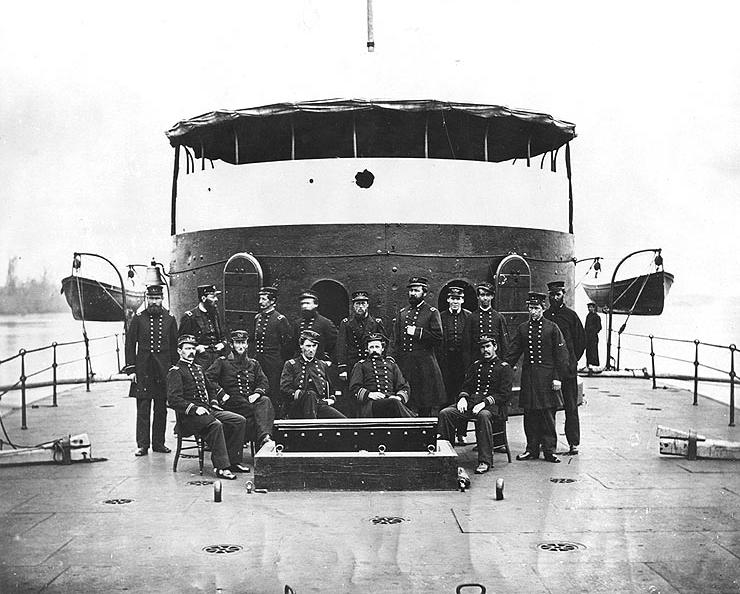
The officers of the USS Mahopac on the James River in early 1865

Mahopac was fitting out at the Brooklyn Navy Yard until 4 October 1864 when, towed by two tugboats, she departed for Hampton Roads, Virginia and arrived there on 6 October. The ship arrived at City Point, Virginia on 3 November for service with the James River Flotilla. She engaged a Confederate artillery battery at Howlett's Farm on 5 and 6 December together with her sisters Saugus and Canonicus. Mahopac was hit five times and lightly damaged; she fired 41 shells in return, of which only six had any effect on the Confederate forces.

Escorted by the sidewheel gunboat Santiago de Cuba, Mahopac, now commanded by Lieutenant Commander E. E. Potter, was ordered on 11 December to steam for Beaufort, South Carolina to prepare for the first bombardment of Fort Fisher on 24–25 December. Plagued by steering problems as the bombardment began, the ship open fire late on the first day of the battle and fired 41 shells. The one hit that she received that day damaged her steering gear. Mahopac participated in the second day of the battle and was not damaged. After Butler ordered his men re-embarked onto their transports on 26 December, the monitor was towed to Beaufort by the gunboat Fort Jackson.

Again towed by the Fort Jackson, Mahopac, now under the command of Lieutenant Commander A. W. Weaver, arrived back at Fort Fisher on 13 January 1865. Together with Canonicus and Saugus, the double-turreted monitor Onondaga and the armored frigate New Ironsides, she bombarded the fort for three days until it was captured by Union troops. On her second shot at the beginning of the battle, one of her 15-inch guns burst at the muzzle. Despite the loss of one gun, the ship fired 204 shells at the fort; she was hit several times in return, but suffered neither damage nor casualties.

Transferred to the South Atlantic Blockading Squadron, Mahopac was ordered to Charleston, South Carolina on 17 January, towed by the gunboat Nereus. The ship remained there on picket duty until 8 March when she returned to Chesapeake Bay and rejoined the North Atlantic Blockading Squadron. She contributed boats for clearing the James River of "torpedoes" after the Confederate ships were scuttled on the night of 2/3 April and Richmond occupied. On 5 April, Mahopac and Saugus were to ordered report to the Washington Navy Yard. She was decommissioned in June and laid up there.

Mahopac was recommissioned on 15 January 1866 and served on the East Coast. Renamed Castor on 15 June 1869, she resumed her original name on 10 August. The ship was placed in reserve on 11 March 1872 at Hampton Roads, but was recommissioned on 21 November 1873. The ship was based at Key West, Florida until 1876 when she was transferred to Port Royal, South Carolina. Mahopac was transferred to Norfolk, Virginia in July 1877 and then moored at Brandon, Virginia, and at City Point, before being placed in ordinary at Richmond from 1889 to 1895. The ship was transferred to the Philadelphia Naval Shipyard at League Island in 1895. She was struck from the Navy List on 14 January 1902 and was sold on 25 March 1902.
