= USS Tuscarora =

Sloop-of-war of the United States Navy

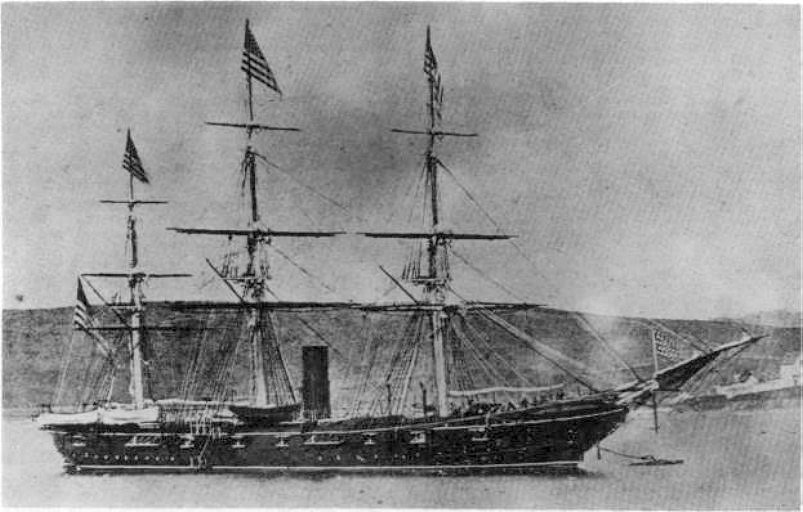

History

United States
- Name: USS Tuscarora
- Builder: Merrick & Sons, Philadelphia, Pennsylvania
- Laid down: 27 June 1861
- Launched: 24 August 1861
- Commissioned: 5 December 1861
- Decommissioned: 4 June 1864
- Recommissioned: 3 October 1864
- Decommissioned: 30 May 1865
- Recommissioned: Later in 1865
- Decommissioned: 10 February 1871
- Recommissioned: 16 May 1872
- Decommissioned: 14 September 1876
- Recommissioned: 10 January 1878
- Decommissioned: 31 May 1880
- Stricken: 1883
- Fate: Sold 20 November 1883

General characteristics
- Type: Sloop-of-war
- Displacement: 1,457 long tons (1,480 t)
- Length: 198 ft 6 in (60.50 m)
- Beam: 33 ft 2 in (10.11 m)
- Draft: 14 ft 10 in (4.52 m)
- Speed: 11 knots (20 km/h; 13 mph)
- Armament: 2 × 11 in (280 mm) Dahlgren smoothbore guns; 2 × 32-pounder guns; 4 × 57 cwt 32-pounder guns; 1 × 30-pounder Parrott rifle

The first USS Tuscarora was a Mohican-class sloop of war in the United States Navy. The ship served during the American Civil War and then undertook a variety of naval duties, including cable laying and oceanographic study in the 1870s.

== Design and construction ==
In 1857, US Secretary of the Navy Isaac Toucey requested USD 2,300,000 government funding for the construction of ten sloops of war. Funding was authorized but construction of the Tuscarora did not take place until after the start of the Civil War in June 1861. Tuscarora was laid down on 27 June 1861 at Philadelphia, Pennsylvania, by Merrick & Sons. The ship was built with 1,457 tons displacement, a length of 198' 6" and a breadth of 32' 2". She had a reciprocating steam engine producing 717 horsepower and sails. Her initial armament was two 11-inch smothbore cannon and six 8-inch shell guns. She was launched on 24 August 1861; sponsored by Miss Margaret Lardner; and commissioned on 5 December 1861, Commander Tunis A. M. Craven in command.

== Searching for Confederate raiders, 1861–1864 ==
Later that month, Tuscarora sailed for Southampton, England, under orders to capture or sink the cruiser CSS Nashville. Nashville had run the Union blockade on 21 October and docked at Southampton after crossing the Atlantic, becoming the first vessel to show the Confederate flag in English waters. She finally weighed anchor and departed on 3 February 1862, but Tuscarora was unable to pursue her as English law required that two belligerent vessels leave port separated by not less than 24 hours. Comdr. Craven then sailed for Gibraltar where, upon his arrival on 12 February, he found the raider CSS Sumter – Comdr. Raphael Semmes in command – anchored.

For almost two months, Craven and Semmes exchanged verbal broadsides both with each other and with the British authorities. Semmes then cleverly feigned preparations for departure, only to abandon Sumter in port on 11 April. Tuscarora remained at Gibraltar until relieved by her sister ship, Kearsarge, on 12 June. She put in at Cádiz, Spain, on 18 June, for repairs.

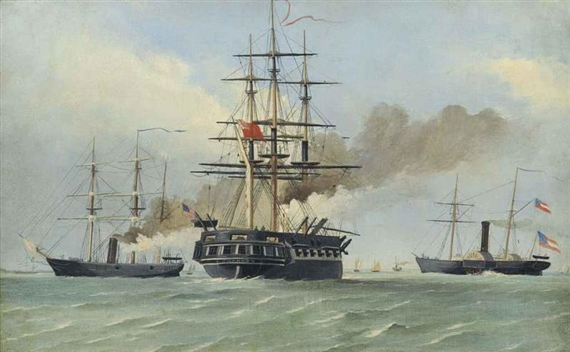
HMS Shannon enforcing International Law between the Union gunboat USS Tuscarora and the Confederate blockade-runner Thomas L. Wragg in Southampton Water, 1862

On June 23, she received orders to sail immediately for England and to deploy off the coast in search of the recently launched Confederate raider CSS Alabama. Tuscarora reconnoitered the southern coasts of England and Ireland and scoured the Irish Channel without finding any trace of the vessel. On 26 August 1862 she docked at Queenstown (now Cobh) in Ireland, but was ordered to leave despite a gale. Three days later, she came in to Kingstown (now Dún Laoghaire)for supplies and repairs. While there, she was under observation from HMS Shannon (1855) and HMS Ajax (1809). She left shortly and returned to Spanish waters in September. She cruised off the Azores during October, but again found nothing. On 1 December 1862, Tuscarora was ordered to remain off the European coast and to protect American shipping. On 15 March 1863, she reported that she had no intelligence that Confederate vessels were operating in her area. She returned to the Philadelphia Navy Yard later that month.

Tuscarora left Philadelphia on 6 June 1863, bound for the New York Navy Yard. She got underway again on 14 June to search for the bark CSS Tacony and patrolled off Bermuda before putting into Hampton Roads for supplies on 22 June. Two days later, she headed north and cruised between Cape Henry and the coast of Nova Scotia before arriving at Boston, Massachusetts, 12 days later. During her time at sea, she failed to locate Tacony. During August, Tuscarora searched for Confederate raiders off the Grand Banks, Newfoundland, but encountered none before she returned to Boston on 3 September.

Early in October, Tuscarora left Boston for duty with the North Atlantic Blockading Squadron. She arrived off Wilmington, North Carolina, on October 7 and was ordered to Beaufort, North Carolina, where she served as a storeship. The vessel subsequently returned to Boston and was decommissioned there on 4 June 1864.

== North Atlantic Blockading Squadron, 1864–1865 ==
Tuscarora was recommissioned at Boston on 3 October 1864 and reassigned to the North Atlantic Blockading Squadron. She put in at Hampton Roads on 8 October and took up blockade station off Wilmington. Tuscarora participated in the unsuccessful attempt to take Fort Fisher, on 24 December and 25 December. In mid-January 1865, she returned to waters off Wilmington, and a landing party from the vessel helped to capture the fort on the 15th. She suffered three men killed and 12 wounded during the assault.

== South Atlantic Blockading Squadron, 1865 ==
The next day, Tuscarora was reassigned to the South Atlantic Blockading Squadron. Towing monitor Canonicus, she sailed for Port Royal, South Carolina, on 17 January, and arrived on the 20th to deploy off Georgetown, South Carolina. She was transferred to the blockade off Ossabaw Sound, Georgia, on 5 March 1865, and escorted Jefferson Davis, his family, and other captured Confederate officials aboard the steamer William P. Clyde from Port Royal to Hampton Roads on 16 May to 19 May. After disembarking her famous passengers at Fort Monroe, Tuscarora continued north to the Boston Navy Yard where she was decommissioned on 30 May.

== Post-Civil War, 1865–1880 ==
Tuscarora was recommissioned later in the year and sailed on 2 November 1865 for the Pacific Ocean via Cape Horn. She served with the South Pacific Squadron from 1866 until May 1869. She stood off Valparaíso, Chile, during the Spanish bombardment on 31 March 1866 and was also present at Callao, Peru, when the Spanish shelled it on 2 May. In 1867, Tuscarora stopped at Tahiti and other islands of the Society group. She also touched at Fiji, where she received payment of awards made to United States citizens in 1855 and 1858 for injuries and losses sustained as a result of acts of the natives.

Tuscarora returned to South America in 1868 and was placed at the disposal of the Chilean government to assist victims of the great earthquake which had occurred on 18 November 1867. In February 1869, she investigated the imprisonment of the United States consul at Buenaventura, Colombia, and moved to Valparaíso at the end of the month. She departed Valparaíso on 12 May bound for the North Atlantic and arrived at Key West, Florida, on 28 July. Tuscarora ended the year stationed at Aspinwall, Colombia, now Colón, Panama.

Tuscarora remained at Aspinwall until April 1870; then returned to Key West. She cruised off the coast of Cuba in June and escorted the ironclads Wyandotte, Ajax, and Manhattan from New Orleans to Key West. After again cruising the Caribbean, she arrived at Portsmouth, New Hampshire, on 31 January 1871 and was decommissioned there on 10 February.

=== Cable laying and oceanographic work ===
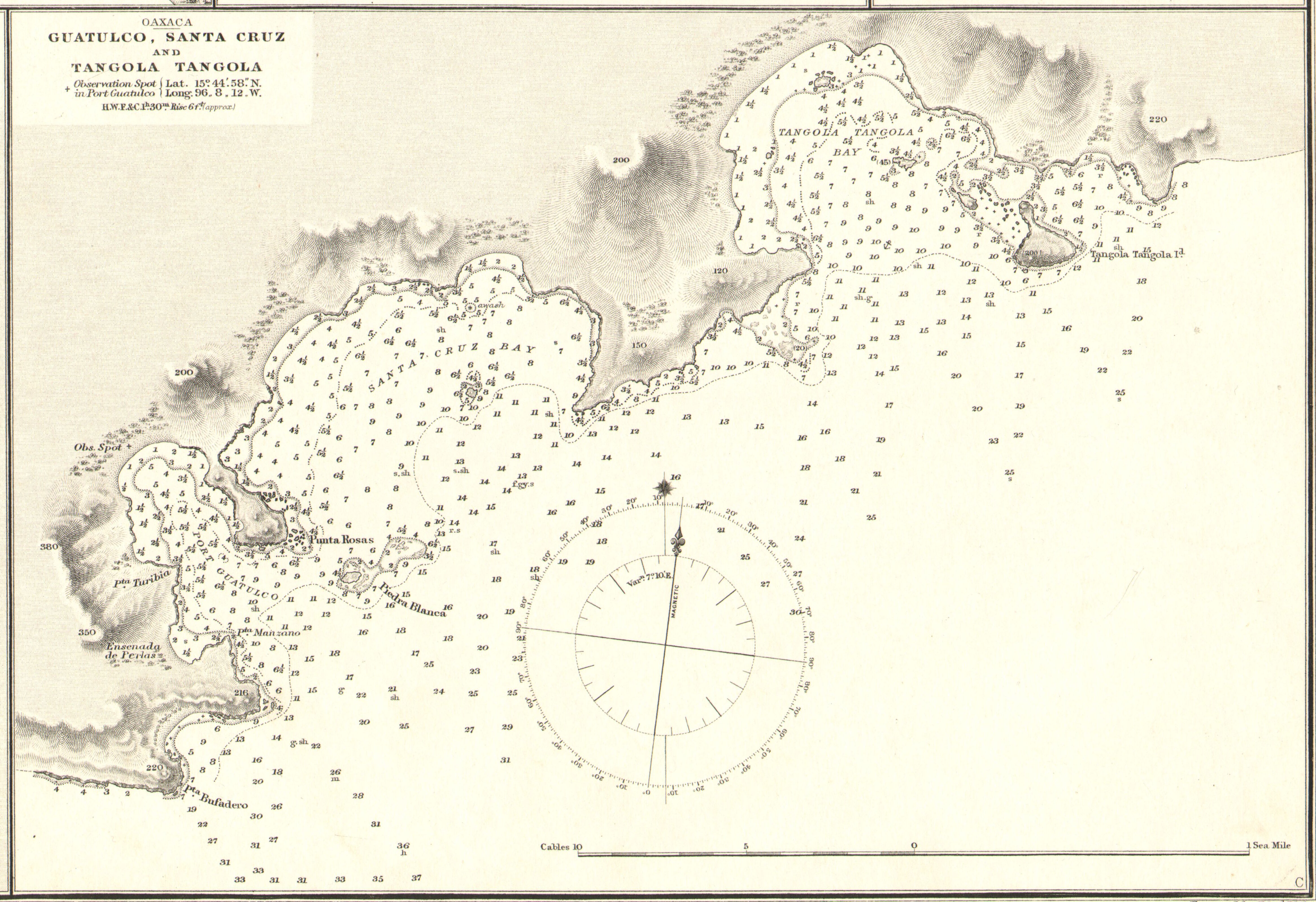
Guatulco Santa Cruz and Tangola Tangola surveyed by USS Tuscarora 1879, published Admiralty 1883

In 1872, the decision was made for the ship to be recommissioned to undertake oceanographic and Hydrographic surveys under Commander Belknap. She was recommissioned on 16 May 1872 and assigned to the South Pacific Station. Tuscarora left Portsmouth on 22 June and arrived at Valparaiso on 26 October 1872. The ship was assigned work in surveying the isthmus of Panama and also landed some armed sailors to protect American property on 6 May during a civil disturbance in Panama. She remained in South American waters through June 1873, sailing for San Francisco via Acapulco on 17 May. After her arrival on 25 June, Tuscarora had her 8-inch guns removed, her hull cleaned and sheathing renewed and was then fitted out with new surveying equipment. This included a new Thompson Sounding Machine (using piano wire for depth sounding work).

The ship then departed San Francisco and surveyed the sea floor off the northwest coast to determine a suitable route for a submarine communication cable. The ship collected 48 depth soundings and discovered several sea mounts, as well as several ocean trenches. The deepest sounding was 4,655 fathoms (later to be named the Kuril Trench (the ship's wire had a maximum extent of 5,000 feet). As well as soundings for a cable route to Hawaii, the ship also undertook 34 depth soundings off Cape Flattery and carried out 83 soundings to determine the sea shelf off the West coast of America. The vessel returned to San Francisco on 6 November. The ship resupplied and proceeded to sea in December 1873 to undertake 8 oceanographic transits to further understand the depth measurements and temperatures around the extent of the continental shelf.

In January 1874, Tuscarora took soundings for a submarine cable route between the United States, Japan, and China. The ship arrived at Honolulu, Oahu, in February. A force of 150 officers, bluejackets, and marines from her and from USS Portsmouth, under the command of Lt.-Cdr. Theodore F. Jewell, quelled a large riot that followed the election of King David Kalākaua at the request of U.S. Minister Henry A. Peirce. Order was restored by the 20th. The ship then resumed its survey, to the Bonin Islands, discovering six new seamounts. The ship then reached the waters around Japan, arriving in Yokohama on 22 April and departing 8 June. The ship then surveyed waters up towards the Kurile Islands and the Aleutians. After performing further survey work, Tuscarora returned to San Francisco for refitting in October.

Tuscarora was transferred to the North Pacific Station on 11 October 1874 and left for Honolulu on 1 November with orders to take soundings of the ocean bottom every 30 nautical miles (60 km). She remained at Honolulu through January 1875. The vessel touched at Samoa in March and returned to Honolulu in June and to San Francisco in July. She left in September and performed survey work in the South Pacific, visiting the Fiji Islands, Australia, and Samoa. During her voyages, she made over 500 ocean floor soundings and temperature readings, discovering the depth of the Japan Trench and the Aleutian Trench. She returned to San Francisco and was decommissioned at the Mare Island Navy Yard on 14 September 1876. Tuscarora was laid up for repairs during 1877.

Tuscarora was recommissioned at Mare Island on 10 January 1878, and was assigned special oceanic survey work off the western coasts of Central and South America. She returned to Mare Island for repairs on 30 June 1879 but headed south again on 25 September to resume her duties. Tuscarora again returned to Mare Island on 21 April 1880 and was decommissioned there on 31 May 1880 for repairs. The repairs and modifications were never completed, and the vessel was struck from the Navy List in 1883.

Tuscarora was sold at Mare Island to W. E. Mighell on 20 November 1883.

== See also ==
- Confederate States Navy
