= Joseph N. Miller =

American Navy admiral (1836–1909)

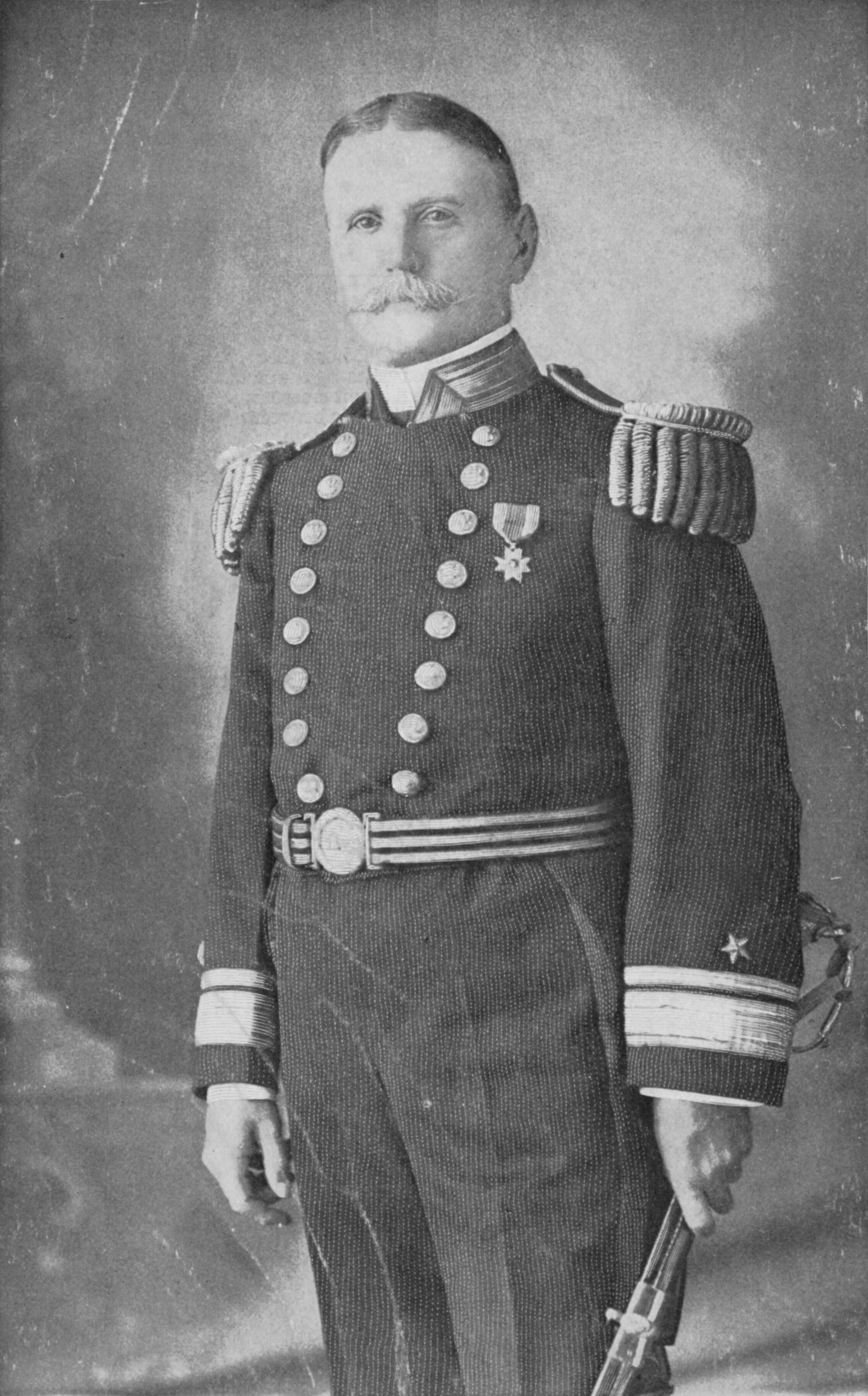
- Born: 22 November 1836; Springfield, Ohio
- Died: 25 April 1909 (aged 72) East Orange, New Jersey
- Allegiance: United States of America
- Branch: United States Navy; Union Navy
- Service years: 1854–1898
- Rank: Rear Admiral
- Commands: Pacific Squadron; Boston Navy Yard; USS Vermont; USS Chicago; USS Tennessee; USS Wabash; USS Tuscarora; USS Ajax; USS Ossipee; USS Nahant; USS Sangamon
- Conflicts: American Civil War; Spanish–American War

Joseph Nelson Miller (22 November 1836 – 25 April 1909) was a United States Navy rear admiral. He served as commander of the Pacific Squadron from 1897 to 1898. Miller fought in the Union Navy during the American Civil War and later represented the U.S. Navy at the Diamond Jubilee of Queen Victoria in June 1897 and at the annexation of Hawaii by the United States in August 1898.

== Biography ==
Miller was born in Springfield, Ohio on 22 November 1836. Appointed to the United States Naval Academy from Ohio in 1851, he graduated third of eighteen in the class of 1855 and was one of six, including Thomas O. Selfridge, who passed the graduation examination after only three years in June 1854. After graduation, Miller served aboard the frigate USS Independence on Pacific Station from 1854 to 1856. After passing an additional examination, he was promoted to passed midshipman on 22 November 1856.

From February 1857 to October 1858, Miller served as an assistant instructor at the Naval Academy. On 22 January 1858, he was promoted to master. From October 1858 to September 1860, Miller was assigned to the sloop-of-war USS Preble. From December 1858 to February 1859, his ship participated in the Paraguay expedition. On 19 February 1860, he was promoted to lieutenant. In March 1860, Miller served as executive officer aboard the chartered steamer Indianola during the Battle of Antón Lizardo at Veracruz, helping to capture the steamer General Miramón.

From September 1860 to April 1861, Miller returned to the Naval Academy as an assistant instructor. After the outbreak of the Civil War, he was reassigned to the brig USS Perry on Atlantic coast blockade duty from May to November 1861. From November 1861 to May 1862, Miller served aboard the steamer USS Cambridge in the North Atlantic Blockading Squadron. In March 1862, his vessel towed the frigate USS St. Lawrence into action during the first day of the Battle of Hampton Roads. From May to August 1862, he returned to the Naval Academy as executive officer of the practice ship USS John Adams. On 16 July 1862, Miller was promoted to lieutenant commander.

From September 1862 to June 1863, Miller served as executive officer of the monitor USS Passaic in the South Atlantic Blockading Squadron. He was officially commended by his commanding officer for his actions during the naval attack on Fort McAllister, Georgia in March 1863 and the naval attack on Fort Sumter, South Carolina in April 1863. From September to November 1863, Miller was executive officer of the sloop-of-war USS Sacramento. In November 1863, he became executive officer of the monitor USS Sangamon in the North Atlantic Blockading Squadron. Serving as commanding officer of Sangamon in February 1864, Miller joined the blockade of Charleston, South Carolina. Transferred to the monitor USS Nahant as executive officer, he served as her commanding officer during a 16 May 1864 naval attack on Fort Sumter.

From September 1864 to March 1865, Miller served as executive officer of the monitor USS Monadnock. He was commended by his commanding officer for his actions during both the first and second naval attacks on Fort Fisher, North Carolina in December 1864 and January 1865. From March 1865 to September 1867, Miller served as a department head at the Naval Academy. From October 1867 to January 1870, he was executive officer of the sidewheel steam frigate USS Powhatan in both the Pacific and North Atlantic Squadrons. On 25 January 1870, Miller was promoted to commander.

From April 1870 to November 1872, Miller served as chief of staff of the Pacific Squadron and commanding officer of the screw sloop-of-war USS Ossipee. From February to November 1873, he was an assistant hydrographer. From November 1873 to May 1874, Miller served as commanding officer of the monitor USS Ajax. From June 1874 to August 1875, he was again an assistant hydrographer. From August 1875 to August 1876, Miller was given command of the sloop-of-war USS Tuscarora on Pacific Station. He performed a line of deep sea soundings between Honolulu and Brisbane and made a reconnaissance visit to Samoa.

From December 1876 to March 1877, Miller was an assistant in the Bureau of Yards and Docks. From March 1877 to October 1880, he served as a lighthouse inspector for the Eleventh District. On 28 May 1881, Miller was promoted to captain. From May 1881 to April 1882, he served as commanding officer of the receiving ship USS Wabash at the Boston Navy Yard. From May to August 1882 and from September 1883 to October 1884, Miller was chief of staff of the North Atlantic Squadron and commander of the screw frigate USS Tennessee. In between, he served as a member of the USS Jeannette Court of Inquiry from October 1882 to March 1883 and the USS Ashuelot General Court-Martial from March to July 1883.

From May 1885 to May 1888, Miller returned to command of the receiving ship Wabash at the Boston Navy Yard. From May 1888 to May 1891, he was captain of the yard at the New York Navy Yard. From May 1891 to June 1892, Miller served as commanding officer of the protected cruiser USS Chicago, flagship of Rear Adm. John G. Walker in the Squadron of Evolution. In November 1892, he assumed command of the receiving ship USS Vermont at the New York Navy Yard.

Promoted to commodore on 16 April 1894, Miller served as commandant of the Boston Navy Yard. Promoted to rear admiral on 21 March 1897, he was detailed in May 1897 to represent the U.S. Navy at Queen Victoria's Diamond Jubilee with his flag on the armored cruiser USS Brooklyn. In August 1897, Miller assumed command of the Pacific Squadron from Rear Adm. Lester A. Beardslee in Honolulu. After the outbreak of the Spanish–American War, he was recalled to San Francisco where he organized the naval reserves on the Pacific coast. In July 1898, Miller returned to Honolulu with his flag on the protected cruiser USS Philadelphia for the impending annexation of Hawaii. He retired from active duty on 22 November 1898, having reached the mandatory retirement age of sixty-two.

== Personal life ==
Miller was the son of Reuben Miller and Mary (Hedges) Miller. He had five brothers and one sister who lived to adulthood. From March 1839 to March 1857, his father held the elected post of auditor in Clark County, Ohio. In Autumn 1856, he was elected justice of the peace for Springfield Township and held that post until his retirement in Fall 1874 at the age of seventy-seven.

On 22 November 1866, Miller married Ellen Comstock (1842–1867). On 13 November 1877, he married Helen Wills (1849–1916). In Summer 1897, his second wife and their daughter accompanied him to the United Kingdom on the Brooklyn. Their daughter contracted typhoid fever during the trip and died in London.

After his retirement, Miller and his second wife lived in East Orange, New Jersey. He died at his home there on 25 April 1909 and was interred at Arlington National Cemetery three days later.
