= USS Ajax (1864) =

Union Canonicus class monitor

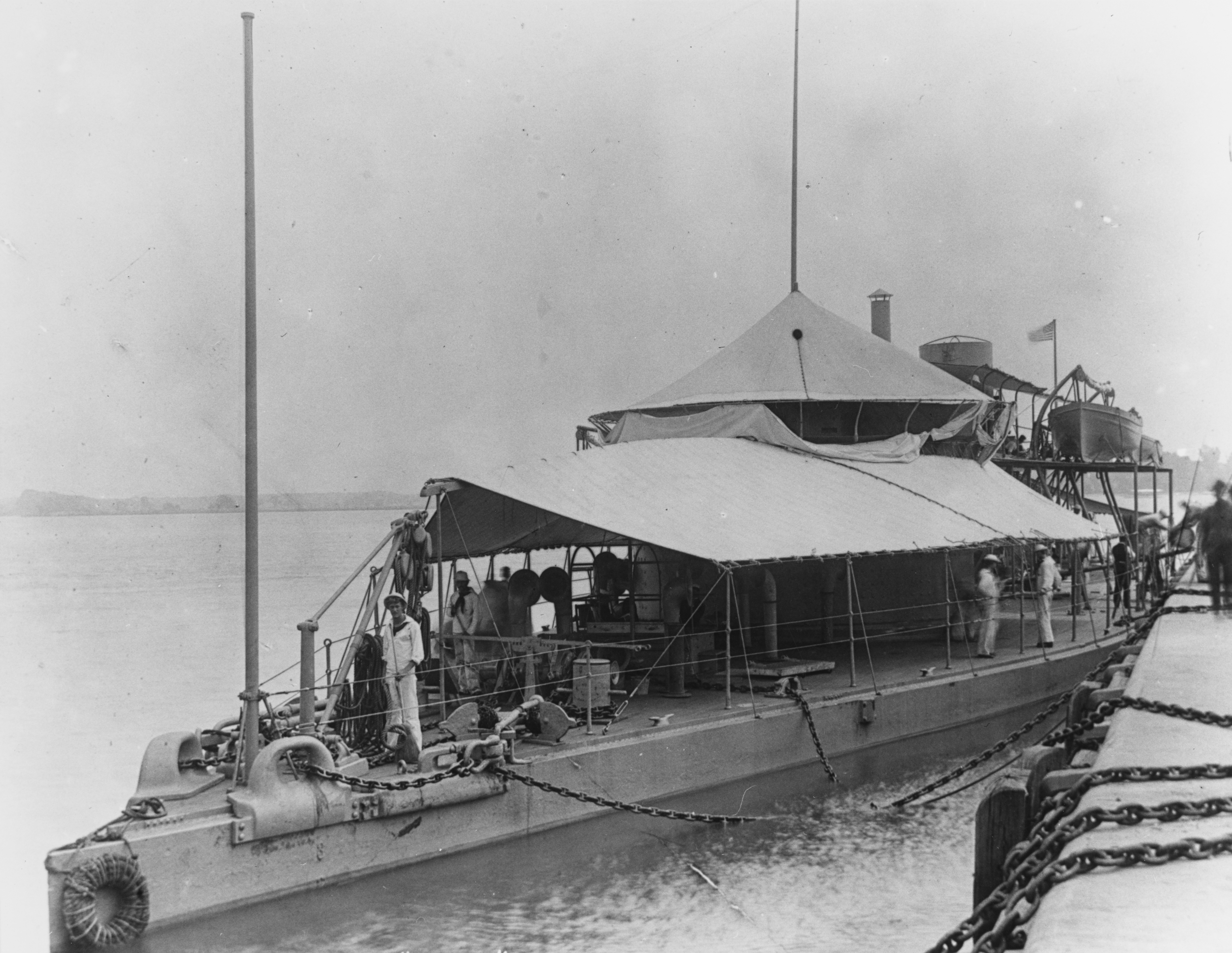
- Ajax during the Spanish–American War

History

United States
- Name: Manayunk; Ajax
- Namesake: Manayunk; Ajax
- Ordered: 15 September 1862
- Builder: Snowden & Mason, Pittsburgh, Pennsylvania
- Laid down: 1862
- Launched: 18 December 1864
- Completed: 27 September 1865
- Commissioned: 1 January 1871
- Decommissioned: 1 September 1898
- Renamed: Ajax, 15 June 1869
- Fate: Sold for scrap, 10 October 1899

General characteristics
- Class & type: Canonicus-class monitor
- Displacement: 2,100 long tons (2,100 t)
- Tons burthen: 1,034 tons (bm)
- Length: 235 ft (72 m)
- Beam: 43 ft 8 in (13.31 m)
- Draft: 13 ft 6 in (4.11 m)
- Installed power: 320 ihp (240 kW); 4 × fire-tube boilers
- Propulsion: 1 × Propeller; 1 × Ericsson Vibrating-lever steam engine
- Speed: 8 kn (15 km/h; 9.2 mph)
- Complement: 100 officers and enlisted men
- Armament: 2 × 15-inch (381 mm) Dahlgren smoothbore guns
- Armor: Gun turret: 10 in (250 mm); Waterline belt: 5 in (130 mm); Deck: 1.5 in (38 mm); Pilot house: 10 in (250 mm)

USS Ajax, originally named USS Manayunk after a town in Pennsylvania, was a single-turreted Canonicus-class monitor built for the Union Navy during the American Civil War. Completed after the end of the war, Ajax was laid up until 1871, although she received her new name in 1869. The ship was briefly activated in 1871, before a much longer commission began in 1874–1875. She was assigned to the North Atlantic Squadron during this time. Ajax was again placed in reserve in 1891. The ship was on militia duty when the Spanish–American War began and she was recommissioned in 1898, to defend Baltimore, Maryland, although she was decommissioned later in the year before the necessary refit could be completed. Ajax was sold for scrap in 1899.

== Design ==
Ajax was 235 ft (72 m) long overall, had a beam of 43 ft 8 in (13.31 m) and had a maximum draft of 13 ft 6 in (4.11 m). Ajax had a tonnage of 1,034 tons burthen and displaced 2,100 long tons (2,100 t). Her crew consisted of 100 officers and enlisted men.

Ajax was powered by a two-cylinder horizontal Ericsson vibrating-lever steam engine that drove one propeller using steam generated by four Stimers horizontal fire-tube boilers. The 320-indicated-horsepower (240 kW) engine gave the ship a top speed of 8 knots (15 km/h; 9.2 mph). She carried 140–150 long tons (140–150 t) of coal. Ajax's main armament consisted of two smoothbore, muzzle-loading, 15-inch (381 mm) Dahlgren guns mounted in a single gun turret. Each gun weighed approximately 43,000 pounds (20,000 kg). They could fire a 350-pound (158.8 kg) shell up to a range of 2,100 yards (1,900 m) at an elevation of +7°.

The exposed sides of the hull were protected by five layers of 1-inch (25 mm) wrought iron plates, backed by wood. The armor of the gun turret and the pilot house consisted of ten layers of one-inch plates. The ship's deck was protected by armor 1.5 inches (38 mm) thick. A 5-by-15-inch (130 by 380 mm) soft iron band was fitted around the base of the turret to prevent shells and fragments from jamming the turret as had happened during the First Battle of Charleston Harbor in April 1863. The base of the funnel was protected to a height of 6 feet (1.8 m) by 8 inches (200 mm) of armor. A "rifle screen" of 1/2-inch (13 mm) armor 3 feet (0.9 m) high was installed on the top of the turret to protected the crew against Confederate snipers based on a suggestion by Commander Tunis A. M. Craven, captain of her sister ship Tecumseh. The only known modification after the ship's completion was the addition of a hurricane deck between the turret and the funnel sometime after the end of the Civil War.

== Construction ==
The contract for construction of Ajax, originally named Manayunk, after a town in Pennsylvania, was signed by Snowden & Mason, on 15 September 1862. Her keel was laid down later in the year in Snowden & Mason's new shipyard at Pittsburgh, Pennsylvania. The ship's construction was delayed by multiple changes ordered while she was being built that reflected battle experience with earlier monitors. This included the rebuilding of the turrets and pilot houses to increase their armor thickness from 8 inches (203 mm) to 10 inches and to replace the bolts that secured their armor plates together with rivets to prevent them from being knocked loose by the shock of impact from shells striking the turret. Other changes included deepening the hull by 18 inches (457 mm) to increase the ship's buoyancy, moving the position of the turret to balance the ship's trim and replacing all of the ship's deck armor. She was ready to be launched in April 1864, but the very low level of the Ohio River rendered that impossible. She was finally launched on 18 December. While fitting out, Ajax was ripped loose from her moorings on 5 March 1865, and she had to be towed back to her berth. The following day she was towed to Mound City, Illinois, where she arrived on 11 March. Snowden & Mason had to pay $7,000 for the tow as well as ship 400 long tons (410 t) of material needed to finish the ship.

== Service history ==
The monitor joined her sisters Oneota and Catawba in ordinary opposite Cairo, Illinois, when she was completed on 27 September 1865, although they drew enough water that they had to be anchored in the main channel where they were often struck by debris, drifting ice, and were vulnerable to accidents. This was a persistent problem and the Navy finally decided to move the ships down to New Orleans, in May 1866. The ship was renamed Ajax, on 15 June 1869.

The monitor was briefly commissioned on 1 January 1871, under the command of Lieutenant Commander Charles Love Franklin, and transferred to Key West, Florida, to participate with the North Atlantic Squadron on coast defense maneuvers. She was decommissioned on 1 July 1871, and laid up at the Philadelphia Navy Yard. After a thorough overhaul, Ajax was recommissioned on 13 January 1874, with Commander Joseph N. Miller in command. The ship was assigned to the North Atlantic Squadron and was based at Key West, until she was decommissioned again on 27 July 1875, and laid up at Port Royal, South Carolina. Recommissioned on 5 November 1875, the ship remained at Port Royal, until moved to the James River. She was moored at Brandon and at City Point, Virginia, before being placed in ordinary at Richmond, on 30 June 1891.

On 26 September 1895, Ajax was loaned to the New Jersey Naval Militia and moored at Camden, New Jersey. She was recommissioned for local defense duties on 9 July 1898, during the Spanish–American War in response to pressure from local politicians. The ship was intended for service at Baltimore, but she was decommissioned on 1 September 1898, before the necessary refit had been completed. Ajax was sold at the Philadelphia Navy Yard on 10 October 1899.
