= USS Oneota (1864) =

Canonicus-class monitor

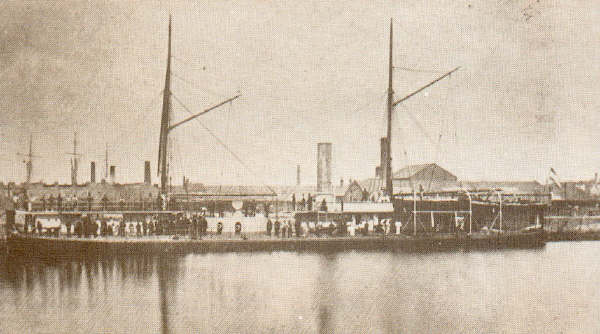
- Oneota after her rechristening as Manco Cápac and the addition of two masts

History

United States
- Name: USS Oneota
- Namesake: Oneota Tribe of the Sioux Indians
- Ordered: 1862
- Builder: Alexander Swift & Company, Cincinnati, Ohio
- Laid down: 1862
- Launched: 21 May 1864
- Completed: 10 June 1865
- Fate: Sold to builder, 13 April 1868

Peru
- Name: BAP Manco Cápac
- Namesake: Manco Cápac
- Acquired: 1868
- Fate: Scuttled, 7 June 1880

General characteristics
- Class & type: Canonicus-class monitor
- Displacement: 2,100 long tons (2,100 t)
- Tons burthen: 1,034 tons (bm)
- Length: 225 ft (68.6 m)
- Beam: 43 ft 3 in (13.2 m)
- Draft: 13 ft 6 in (4.1 m)
- Installed power: 320 ihp (240 kW); 2 × Stimers fire-tube boilers
- Propulsion: 1 × Propeller; 1 × Vibrating-lever steam engine
- Speed: 8 knots (15 km/h; 9.2 mph)
- Complement: 100 officers and enlisted men
- Armament: 2 × 15-inch (381 mm) smoothbore Dahlgren guns
- Armor: Gun turret: 10 in (254 mm); Waterline belt: 5 in (127 mm); Deck: 1.5 in (38 mm); Pilot house: 10 in (254 mm)

USS Oneota was a single-turreted Canonicus-class monitor built for the Union Navy during the American Civil War. Completed shortly after the end of the war, Oneota was laid up until sold to her builders in 1868, and then resold to the Peruvian Navy. Renamed BAP Manco Cápac, the ship participated in the defense of Arica during the War of the Pacific. When the town was taken by Chilean troops in 1880, she was scuttled to prevent her capture. Her wreck was rediscovered in 1960 and it has been heavily looted.

== Description and construction ==
The ship was 225 feet (68.6 m) long overall, had a beam of 43 feet 3 inches (13.2 m) and had a maximum draft of 13 feet 6 inches (4.1 m). Oneota had a tonnage of 1,034 tons burthen and displaced 2,100 long tons (2,100 t). Her crew consisted of 100 officers and enlisted men.

Oneota was powered by a two-cylinder horizontal vibrating-lever steam engine that drove one propeller using steam generated by two Stimers horizontal fire-tube boilers. The 320-indicated-horsepower (240 kW) engine gave the ship a top speed of 8 knots (15 km/h; 9.2 mph). She carried 140–150 long tons (140–150 t) of coal. Oneota's main armament consisted of two smoothbore, muzzle-loading, 15-inch (381 mm) Dahlgren guns mounted in a single gun turret. Each gun weighed approximately 43,000 pounds (20,000 kg). They could fire a 350-pound (158.8 kg) shell up to a range of 2,100 yards (1,900 m) at an elevation of +7°.

The exposed sides of the hull were protected by five layers of 1-inch (25 mm) wrought iron plates, backed by wood. The armor of the gun turret and the pilot house consisted of ten layers of one-inch plates. The ship's deck was protected by armor 1.5 inches (38 mm) thick. A 5-by-15-inch (130 by 380 mm) soft iron band was fitted around the base of the turret to prevent shells and fragments from jamming the turret as had happened to earlier monitors during the First Battle of Charleston Harbor in April 1863. The base of the funnel was protected to a height of 6 feet (1.8 m) by 8 inches (200 mm) of armor. A "rifle screen" of 1/2-inch (13 mm) armor 3 feet (0.9 m) high was installed on the top of the turret to protect the crew against Confederate snipers based on a suggestion by Commander Tunis A. M. Craven, captain of her sister ship Tecumseh.

The contract for Oneota, the only Navy ship to be named after the Oneota Tribe of the Sioux Indians, was awarded to Alexander Swift & Company; the ship was laid down in 1862 at their Cincinnati, Ohio shipyard. She was launched on 21 May 1864 and completed on 10 June 1865. The ship's construction was delayed by multiple changes ordered while she was being built—reflecting battle experience with earlier monitors. This included the rebuilding of the turrets and pilot houses to increase their armor thickness from 8 inches (203 mm) to 10 inches and to replace the bolts that secured their armor plates together with rivets to prevent them from being knocked loose by the shock of impact from shells striking the turret. Other changes included deepening the hull by 18 inches (457 mm) to increase the ship's buoyancy, moving the position of the turret to balance the ship's trim and replacing all of the ship's deck armor. Completion of the ship was further delayed by the low depth of the Ohio River which prevented her movement from Cincinnati in December 1864 to finish fitting out. The river finally rose in March 1865 which allowed the ship to reach Mound City, Illinois on 7 March, where Oneota was placed in ordinary after completion, together with her sisters Catawba and Tippecanoe.

The ships needed a deep-water berth and were moved opposite Cairo, Illinois in mid-1865 even though they still had to be anchored in the main channel where they were often struck by debris, drifting ice, and vulnerable to accidents. Tippecanoe's anchor chain was broken on 27 March 1866 when she was struck by a steamboat towing barges and the monitor collided with Oneota and the two ships were dragged 2 miles (3.2 km) downstream before they could be brought under control. This was a persistent problem and the Navy finally decided to move the ships down to New Orleans in May 1866. In August 1867, the Navy turned over Oneota and Catawba to Swift & Co. contingent on a guarantee that they would be returned in good shape if they could not be sold, and the company began refitting them for Peruvian service.

In October 1867, an agent for Swift & Co. negotiated a deal with Peru to purchase Oneota and her sister for a million dollars apiece. Gideon Welles, Secretary of the Navy, initially indicated that the company could repurchase the two if it refunded the government's costs to build them, but changed his mind and said that he had no authority to do that. Congress debated the issue and ultimately decided that they would be appraised by a board of officers and that the highest competitive bid in equal to or in excess of the appraised value would be accepted. The ship was appraised at $375,000 and sold for that amount, possibly after a rigged bid, on 11 April 1868.

== BAP Manco Cápac ==
The monitor was renamed by the Peruvian Navy as Manco Cápac, after Manco Cápac, the legendary first king of the Kingdom of Cuzco which would grow into the Inca Empire. To prepare the ship for her lengthy voyage to Peru around Cape Horn, Swift & Co. added a breakwater on the bow, stepped two masts with a fore-and-aft rig to supplement her engine, and provided closures to make vents and deck openings water tight.

While this was going on, the United States was negotiating with Great Britain over compensation for losses inflicted by British ships knowingly sold to the Confederacy during the Civil War (the Alabama Claims). Peru had been involved in an undeclared war with Spain (the Chincha Islands War) in 1864–66 and the US was not willing to prejudice its claims against the United Kingdom by performing a similar action for a belligerent power. Negotiations over the issue delayed the departure of the two monitors until January 1869, after Peru bought two steamers, Reyes and Marañon to tow the monitors. They only reached Pensacola, Florida, before machinery breakdowns forced them to wait 30 days for repairs to be completed. En route from Key West to the Bahamas, the ships were separated in heavy weather. When Reyes attempted to reattach her towrope after the storm moderated, she collided with the sharp bow of Manco Cápac and sank in 15 minutes. The monitor, short of coal and food, was forced to make port at Naranjo, Cuba, then held by rebels against the Spanish government. They allowed the ship to restock her supplies, but no coal was available so the crew loaded up enough wood to reach the Bahamas where they were able to send a local schooner to Nassau to inform the authorities of their plight. The ships finally reunited at St. Thomas in the Virgin Islands and had to wait for the Pachitea to arrive from Peru to tow Manco Cápac. While entering Rio de Janeiro on the night of 15 September, Manco Cápac ran aground; she was refloated the following day, but the damage required three months to repair. The ships were joined by the steam corvette Unión during this time. They reached the Strait of Magellan on 29 January 1870 and Callao on 11 May.

In 1879, disagreements over guano and nitrate-rich lands led Chile to start the War of the Pacific with Bolivia and Peru. With the start of this war, the monitor was towed from Callao to the south of Peru to defend the bay of the Peruvian port of Arica, its boilers were repaired and it was propelled at a speed of 2 knots. During the blockade of Arica, the ex-Peruvian turret ship Huáscar, captured by the Chileans at the Battle of Angamos in 1879, attacked the Peruvians at the port of Arica on 27 February 1880, fighting an inconclusive duel with Manco Cápac. The ex-Peruvian ironclad Huáscar failed in her attempt to ram the Peruvian monitor and the Huascar's captain was killed in this engagement of the Naval Battle of Arica. The Chilean fleet continued to blockade Arica as the army closed in on the city from the rear. Manco Cápac hit the schooner Covadonga on blockade duty on 6 June, but the monitor was scuttled to prevent her capture when the city fell the following day.

=== Discovery ===
The wreck was discovered in 1960 and is located 3 miles (4.8 km) west of the mouth of the San José River at a depth of 15.7 meters (51 ft 6 in). The wreck was discovered in 2007, several miles off the coast in about 100 feet of water. The hull is badly corroded and the wreck has been heavily looted. In June 2007 a documentary about the ship, directed by Miguel Vásquez, titled Manco Cápac, la última Estela, premiered.
