= Canonicus-class monitor =

American ironclad ship

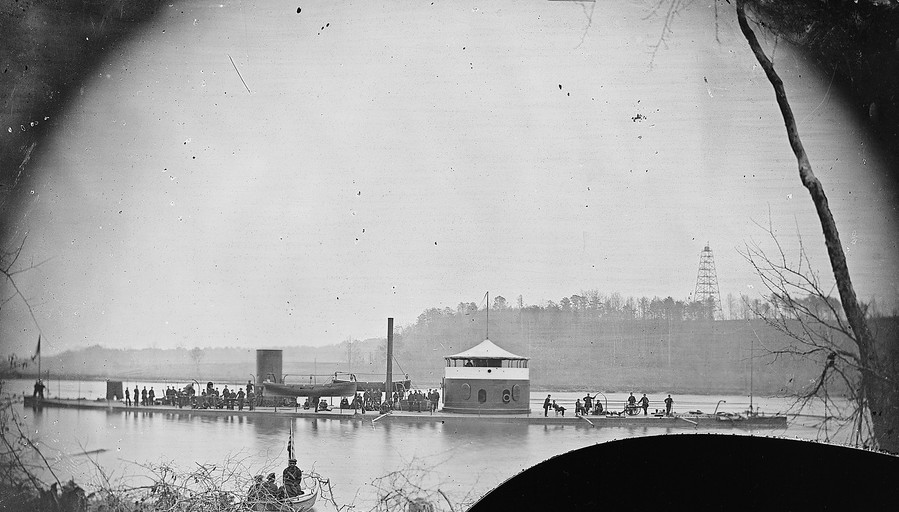
- Mahopac on the Appomattox River, 1864

Class overview
- Operators: United States Navy; Peruvian Navy
- Preceded by: Passaic class
- Succeeded by: Miantonomoh class
- In commission: 1864–1898
- Completed: 9
- Lost: 3
- Scrapped: 6

General characteristics
- Type: Monitor
- Displacement: 2,100 long tons (2,100 t)
- Tons burthen: 1,034 tons (bm)
- Length: 235 ft (72 m) (Canonicus, Ajax); 225 ft (69 m) (Catawba, Oneota); 224 ft (68 m) (Wyandotte); 223 ft (68 m) (Mahopac, Manhattan, Saugus, Techumseh)
- Beam: 43 ft 8 in (13.31 m) (Canonicus, Ajax'); 43 ft 3 in (13.18 m) (Catawba, Oneota); 43 ft 5 in (13.23 m) (Wyandotte); 43 ft 4 in (13.21 m) (Mahopac, Manhattan, Saugus, Techumseh)
- Draft: 13 ft 6 in (4.11 m); 13 ft 3 in (4.04 m) (Wyandotte)
- Installed power: 4 × fire-tube boilers; 320 ihp (240 kW)
- Propulsion: 1 × propeller; 1 × vibrating-lever steam engine
- Speed: 8 kn (15 km/h; 9.2 mph)
- Complement: 100 officers and enlisted men
- Armament: 2 × 15-inch (381 mm) Dahlgren smoothbore guns
- Armor: Gun turret: 10 in (250 mm); Waterline belt: 5 in (130 mm); Deck: 1.5 in (38 mm)

The Canonicus-class or Tippecanoe-class was a class of nine monitors built for the Union Navy during the American Civil War. An improvement on the preceding Passaics, modified in accordance with war experience, each vessel mounted two 15-inch (381 mm) Dahlgren guns. The five ships commissioned during the war participated variously in the Bermuda Hundred Campaign, the Battle of Mobile Bay and the First and Second Battles of Fort Fisher. When attacking the ironclad ram CSS Tennessee in 1865, the monitor Tecumseh was sunk by a naval mine, then termed a "torpedo", 94 men died.

Eight of the suspected conspirators for the assassination of Abraham Lincoln were incarcerated aboard Saugus and the monitor Montauk before they were transferred to the Arsenal Penitentiary. The remaining four ships not commissioned during the war were built on the Ohio River, three at Cincinnati, and Ajax at South Pittsburgh. Of these, Catawba and Oneota, renamed Atahualpa and Manco Cápac respectively, were sold to the Peruvian Navy and participated in the War of the Pacific, both being scuttled to prevent their capture by the Chilean Navy. The last remaining member of the class, the lead ship Canonicus, was an exhibit during the Jamestown Exposition, before being sold and broken up in 1908.

== Design and development ==
In March 1862, United States Secretary of the Navy Gideon Welles wrote a letter advising that the United States Navy would be looking for "harbor and river monitors" to serve in the Gulf of Mexico and the coast of the Atlantic Ocean. A team, led by Alban C. Stimers, worked on a design based on a general plan developed by John Ericsson and in consultation with Gustavus Fox. An initial specification was issued to shipyards on 14 August 1862, that was very similar to the preceding Passaic-class monitor, to which 15 firms submitted bids. Six companies were successful in their bids, consisting of three existing firms, Charles Secor & Co, Harrison Loring and Miles Greenwood, and three new firms created specifically for the task, Alexander Swift & Company, Perine, Secor & Co. and Snowden & Mason. Nine ships were contracted for, which would be known as the Canonicus or Tippecanoe class.

The Canonicus class was an enlarged and improved version of the preceding Passaic-class monitors. Their hull lines were improved and designed for a higher speed of up to 13 knots (24 km/h), although this was not achieved by the vessels themselves. The class consisted of nine vessels. They had a tonnage of 1,034 tons burthen and displaced 2,100 long tons (2,100 t). The individual vessels varied in their dimensions. Canonicus and Ajax were largest, measuring 235 ft (72 m) long overall, with a beam of 43 ft 8 in (13.31 m) and a maximum draft of 13 ft 6 in (4.11 m). Catawba and Oneota were 225 ft (69 m) long overall, had a beam of 43 ft 3 in (13.18 m) and had a maximum draft of 13 ft 6 in (4.11 m). Wyandotte was 224 feet 6 inches (68.4 m) long overall, had a beam of 43 feet 5 inches (13.2 m) and had a maximum draft of 13 feet 3 inches (4.0 m). The shortest of vessels of the class, Mahopac, Manhattan, Saugus and Tecumseh, were 223 feet (68 m) long overall, had a beam of 43 feet 4 inches (13.2 m) and had a maximum draft of 13 feet 6 inches (4.1 m). Each ship had crew consisting of 100 officers and enlisted men.

The ships were powered by a two-cylinder horizontal vibrating-lever steam engine developed by Ericsson that drove one propeller using steam generated by four horizontal fire-tube boilers designed by Stimers. The engine was rated at 320 ihp (240 kW) and propelled the ships at a top speed of 8 knots (15 km/h; 9.2 mph). They carried 140–150 long tons (140–150 t) of coal. Each vessel had main armament that consisted of two smoothbore, muzzle-loading, 15-inch (381 mm) Dahlgren guns mounted in a single gun turret. Each gun weighed approximately 43,000 pounds (20,000 kg). They could fire a 350-pound (158.8 kg) shell up to a range of 2,100 yards (1,900 m) at an elevation of +7°.

The exposed sides of the hull were protected by five layers of 1-inch (25 mm) wrought iron plates, backed by wood and two iron stringers 6 1/2 in (165 mm) deep and 6 in (152 mm) thick for 70 ft (21 m) from the bows, but 4 in (102 mm) elsewhere. The armor of the gun turret, of 21 ft (6 m) internal diameter, and the pilot house consisted of ten layers of one-inch plates. The ship's deck was protected by armor 1.5 inches (38 mm) thick. A 5-by-15-inch (130 by 380 mm) soft iron band was fitted around the base of the turret to prevent shells and fragments from jamming the turret as had happened during the First Battle of Charleston Harbor in April 1863. The base of the funnel was protected to a height of 6 feet (1.8 m) by 8 inches (200 mm) of armor. A "rifle screen" of 1/2-inch (13 mm) armor 3 feet (0.9 m) high was installed on the top of the turret to protected the crew against Confederate snipers based on a suggestion by Commander Tunis A. M. Craven, captain of Tecumseh.

== Construction ==
The contract for the lead ship, Canonicus, the first Navy ship to be named for the chief of the Narragansett, was awarded to Harrison Loring of Boston, Massachusetts. Meanwhile Tecumseh, Manhattan and Mahopac had been ordered from Charles Secor & Co of New York City, and the majority of the work subcontracted to Joseph Colwell of Jersey City, New Jersey. Saugus was built by Harlan & Hollingsworth at their Wilmington, Delaware, shipyard. The contract for Catawba and Oneota were awarded to Alexander Swift & Company and built at their Cincinnati, Ohio, shipyard. The work was shared with the Niles Works. Manayunk was ordered from Snowden & Mason and built at their new shipyard at Pittsburgh, Pennsylvania.

The contracts were issued in September 1862, and the yards incentivised to complete quickly by being given a $500 bonus for each day completed ahead of schedule and a similar penalty for each day late. Despite told to not start without receiving final plans, the contractors were therefore keen to start building. Consequently, when the specifications were issued on 9 October, which differed from the expectations of the yards, there was concern that the boats would work as expected and work was halted. The first set of alterations was not agreed until 22 December, with more changes based on the experience of the First Battle of Charleston Harbor following on 18 June the following year. By this time, the opportunity to receive the bonus had disappeared.

The changes included rebuilding the turrets and pilot houses to increase their armor thickness from 8 inches (203 mm) to 10 inches and to replace the bolts that secured their armor plates together with rivets to prevent them from being knocked loose by the shock of impact from shells striking the turret. Other changes included deepening their hull by 18 inches (457 mm) to increase the ships' buoyancy, moving the position of the turret to balance the ships' trim and replacing all of the ships' deck armor.

Completion of Catawba and Oneota was further delayed by the low depth of the Ohio River, which prevented their movement to Mound City, Illinois, to complete fitting out. Similar problems were experienced with the Ohio river After her launch was delayed by the very low level of the Ohio River, while fitting out, Manayunk was ripped loose from her moorings and had to be towed back to her berth.

== Ships in class ==
Ship	Builder	Namesake	Name changes	Laid down	Launched	Commissioned or completed(*)	Reference
Canonicus	Harrison Loring, Boston, Massachusetts	Canonicus	Scylla, 15 June 1869; Canonicus, 10 August 1869	1862	1 August 1863	16 April 1864	
Tecumseh	Charles Secor & Co., Jersey City, New Jersey	Tecumseh	Not Applicable	1862	12 September 1863	19 April 1864	
Manhattan	Perine, Secor & Co., Jersey City, New Jersey	Manhattan	Neptune, 15 June 1869; Manhattan, 10 August 1869	1862	14 October 1863	6 June 1864	
Saugus	Harlan & Hollingsworth, Wilmington, Delaware	Saugus, Massachusetts	Centaur, 15 June 1869; Saugus, 10 August 1869	1862	8 February 1864	27 August 1864	
Catawba	Alexander Swift & Company, Cincinnati, Ohio	Catawba River	bought by the Peruvian Navy in 1867; Atahualpa	1862	13 April 1864	10 June 1865*	
Mahopac	Secor & Co., Jersey City, New Jersey	Lake Mahopac	Castor, 15 June 1869; Mahopac, 10 August 1869	1862	17 May 1864	22 September 1864	
Oneota	Alexander Swift & Company, Cincinnati, Ohio	Oneota Tribe of the Sioux Indians	bought by the Peruvian Navy in 1867; Manco Cápac	1862	21 May 1864	10 June 1865*	
Ajax	Snowden & Mason, Pittsburgh, Pennsylvania	Manayunk, Philadelphia	Launched as Manayunk; Ajax, 15 June 1869	1862	18 December 1864	27 September 1865*	
Wyandotte	Miles Greenwood, Cincinnati, Ohio	Wyandotte Tribe	Launched as Tippecanoe; Vesuvius, 15 June 1869; Wyandotte, 10 August 1869	22 September 1862	22 December 1864	15 February 1866*	

== Career ==
=== Civil War service ===
On 22 May 1864, Canonicus, Saugus and Tecumseh protected the transports of Major General Benjamin Butler's Army of the James, supplying the army as it operated on the south bank of the James River during the Bermuda Hundred Campaign. As part of this deployment, Tecumseh sank four hulks and a schooner in an attempt to block the channel. On 21 June, Commander Craven, of Tecumseh, spotted a line of breastworks that the Confederates were building at Howlett's Battery, and his ship opened fire at the workers. The Confederates replied with a battery of four guns near the breastworks and Saugus and Canonicus joined in the bombardment. A half-hour later, Confederate ships near Dutch Gap ineffectively joined in. Saugus fired thirty-six 15-inch shells, Canonicus fired forty and Tecumseh fired forty-six. Saugus received one hit from a Confederate shell and Canonicus two, but no one was wounded or killed during the engagement.

After commissioning, Manhattan steamed for the Gulf of Mexico and arrived at the Pensacola Navy Yard on 7 July, towed by the side-wheel gunboat Bienville. The 2,000 mi (3,200 km) voyage was the longest undertaken by an ironclad. She required nearly two weeks to resupply and to repair damage from two small fires that started after her arrival. The vessel sailed on and arrived outside Mobile Bay on 20 July, being joined by Tecumseh on 4 August. On the following morning, they led the Union fleet attack in what would be termed the Battle of Mobile Bay. The monitors were to concentrate on the Confederate ironclad ram Tennessee. During the battle, Tecumseh struck a "torpedo", as mines were called at the time and sank in 25 seconds. A boat sent by the gunboat Metacomet rescued ten men and delivered them to the river monitor Winnebago. Seven other survivors reached one of the stricken vessel's boats and four were captured when they swam ashore. 94 died. The wreck remains under 15 ft (4.6 m) of water. Manhattan fired a total of eleven shots, six at Tennessee and five at Fort Morgan. Four hits were claimed, including one that broke the Tennessee's steering chains and another that jammed her stern gun port shutter in the closed position. The monitor was hit nine times during the battle, but sustained no significant damage or casualties.

Canonicus, Mahopac and Saugus returned to Howlett's Battery on 5 and 6 December. Mahopac was hit five times and lightly damaged; she fired 41 shells in return, of which six had any effect on the Confederate forces. Saugus fired 14 shells and received only two hits. One of the shots, from a 8-inch (200 mm) Brooke rifle, disabled her turret temporarily when it cracked an armor plate and broke a number of 2-inch (51 mm) bolts. Canonicus fired 24 shots and remained unscathed. Along with 51 other vessels, Canonicus, Mahopac and Saugus also participated in the First Battle of Fort Fisher on 24–25 December. Canonicus anchored at ranges from 900–1,200 yd (820–1,100 m) and fired 144 rounds and was hit four times, but suffered no casualties and no significant damage. Saugus fired 64 shells and Mahopac fired 41 shells, also all with no casualties. The monitors returned to the fort for a second battle on 13–15 January 1865, which led to its successful capture. Three crewmen aboard Canonicus were injured but otherwise there was only light damage to all the vessels. On 18 February, Canonicus captured the steamer Deer, thereby becoming the only member of the class to capture an enemy ship.

On 2 April, Mahopuc and Saugus returned to the James River and, along with eight other warships, contributed boats for clearing the river of "torpedoes". Following the scuttling of the Confederate fleet, on 5 April, Mahopac and Saugus sailed to the Washington Navy Yard. After the assassination of President Abraham Lincoln on 15 April, eight of the suspected conspirators were incarcerated aboard Saugus and the monitor Montauk. On 30 April, they were transferred off the ships to the Arsenal Penitentiary. Mahopac was decommissioned in June.

=== Post-war service ===
Canonicus, towed by the steamer Fahkee, led the monitor Monadnock and other ships into Havana, Cuba, in late May 1866 in search of the Confederate ironclad Stonewall, becoming the first American ironclad to arrive at a foreign port. Sailing into the Philadelphia Navy Yard, on 25 June 1869, the ship was decommissioned five days later, briefly named Scylla between 15 June and 10 August, recommissioned on 22 January 1872 and decommissioned in 1877 at Pensacola, Florida. After a period as an exhibit during the Jamestown Exposition, the vessel was sold on 19 February 1908.

Mahopac was recommissioned on 15 January 1866 and served on the East Coast. Briefly named Castor between 15 June and 10 August 1869, the ship was placed in reserve on 11 March 1872 at Hampton Roads, recommissioned on 21 November 1873 and then placed in ordinary at Richmond, Virginia, in 1889. The ship was transferred to the Philadelphia Naval Shipyard in 1895, struck from the Navy List on 14 January 1902 and sold on 25 March.

After being was transferred to Key West, Florida In 1870, Manhattan was refitted in 1872–1873 in Philadelphia, returning to Key West for fleet maneuvers before serving off the coast of North and South Carolina from 25 April 1876. After spending time in Virginia at Norfolk, Brandon, City Point and Richmond, Manhattan was transferred to Philadelphia and laid up at League Island in 1888 before being struck from the Navy List on 14 December 1901 and sold on 24 March 1902 for breaking up.

Manayunk, Oneota and Catawba had been laid up in ordinary opposite Cairo, Illinois during the civil war. Vulnerable to damage from debris flowing down the river, the Navy finally moved them to New Orleans in May 1866. Renamed Ajax on 15 June 1867, Manayunk was commissioned on 1 January 1871, serving intermittently before being placed in ordinary at Richmond, on 30 June 1891. Similarly, Tippecanoe, by now named Wyandotte, was commissioned on 24 January 1876. Briefly recommissioned for local defense duties in response to the Spanish–American War, Wyandotte and Ajax were decommissioned in September 1898 and sold on 17 January and 10 October 1899 respectively.

Decommissioned on 13 June 1865, Saugus was recommissioned on 30 April 1869 amidst reports of mistreatment of American citizens duringt the Ten Years' War in Cuba and patrolled along the Florida coast until end of 1870. After being towed to Philadelphia, Pennsylvania, for repairs, Saugus was recommissioned there on 9 November 1872 and was based at Key West until transferred to Port Royal, South Carolina, in 1876. Saugus returned to Washington and was decommissioned there on 8 October 1877 and sold on 25 May 1891.

=== Peruvian service ===
In August 1867, the Navy sold Catawba and Oneota back to Swift & Co., contingent on a guarantee that they would be returned in good shape if they could not be sold, and the company began refitting them. In October 1867, an agent for Swift & Co. negotiated a deal with Peru to purchase the ships for a million dollars apiece. The ships were appraised at $375,000 and $380,000 respectively, and sold for that amount, possibly after a corrupt bidding process, on 11 April 1868. Catawba was renamed Atahualpa, after the Emperor Atahualpa, the last ruler of the Inca Empire and Oneota became Manco Cápac in honor of Manco Cápac, the legendary first king of the Kingdom of Cuzco. To prepare the ships for their lengthy voyage to Peru, around Cape Horn, Swift & Co. added a breakwater on the bow, stepped two masts with a fore-and-aft rig to supplement the engines, and provided closures to make vents and deck openings water tight.

While this was going on, the United States was negotiating with Britain over the Alabama Claims, seeking compensation for losses inflicted by Confederate raiders built in British shipyards. Peru had been involved in an undeclared war with Spain, and the US was not willing to prejudice its claims against the United Kingdom by performing a similar action for a belligerent power. Negotiations over the issue delayed the departure of the two monitors until January 1869, by which time Peru had bought two steamers, Reyes and Marañon to tow the monitors. Machinery breakdowns meant that, on reaching Pensacola, Florida, they were forced to wait 30 days for repairs to be completed. En route from Key West to the Bahamas, the ships were separated in heavy weather. Reyes collided with the sharp bow of Manco Cápac and sank in 15 minutes. Short on food, water and fuel, the monitor, was able to send a local schooner to Nassau to inform the authorities of their plight. Atahualpa reached Great Inagua, in the Bahamas, and was able to resupply, although her officers had to pay for themselves. The ships finally reunited at St. Thomas in the Virgin Islands and had to wait for the Pachitea to arrive from Peru to tow Manco Cápac. While entering Rio de Janeiro on the night of 15 September, Manco Cápac ran aground. She was refloated the following day, but the damage required three months to repair. The monitors reached the Strait of Magellan on 29 January 1870 and Callao on 11 May.

Atahualpa was towed from Callao to Iquique, then part of Peru, from 11–22 May 1877, to defend that port from the rebel ironclad Huáscar during the Peruvian Civil War. When the War of the Pacific with Chile began in 1879, Atahualpa was stationed in Callao and Manco Cápacwas sent to defend Arica. During the blockade of Arica, Huáscar, now in the hands of the Chilean Navy after the 1879 Battle of Angamos, attacked Arica on 27 February 1880, fighting an inconclusive duel with Manco Cápac. After striking the schooner Covadonga on blockade duty on 6 June, Manco Cápac was scuttled to prevent her capture when the city fell the following day. On 11 December 1880, the Chilean fleet started firing at Callao, at ranges of up to 4 miles (6.4 km). Atahualpa, escorted by a tug, sortied to fight a long-range battle with the Chilean fleet, but failed to inflict any damage. On 16 January 1881, her crew scuttled her to prevent her capture by Chilean forces as they advanced into the city. She was subsequently raised and sold to be broken up.

== See also ==
- List of ironclads
