= USS Catawba (1864) =

Canonicus-class monitor

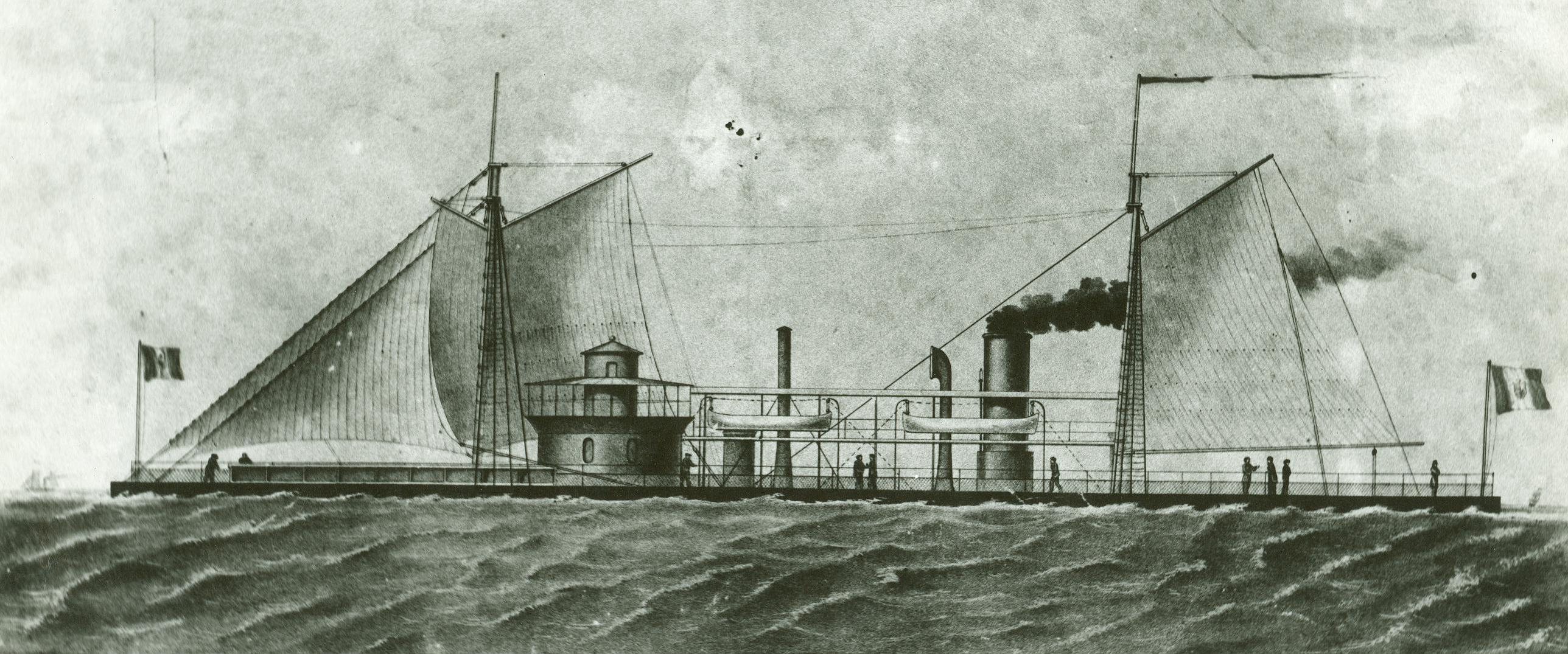
- A lithograph of the monitor during her time in the Peruvian Navy as Atahualpa.

History

United States
- Name: Catawba
- Namesake: Catawba River
- Ordered: 10 September 1862
- Builder: Alexander Swift & Company, Cincinnati, Ohio
- Laid down: 1862
- Launched: 13 April 1864
- Completed: 7 June 1865
- Fate: Sold to builder, 13 April 1868

Peru
- Name: Atahualpa
- Namesake: Atahualpa
- Acquired: 2 April 1868
- Commissioned: June 1870
- Reclassified: As a storage hulk
- Fate: Scuttled, 16 January 1881 and later salvaged; Scrapped, early 1900s

General characteristics
- Class & type: Canonicus-class monitor
- Displacement: 2,100 long tons (2,100 t)
- Tons burthen: 1,034 tons (bm)
- Length: 225 ft (69 m)
- Beam: 43 ft 3 in (13.18 m)
- Draft: 13 ft 6 in (4.1 m)
- Installed power: 320 ihp (240 kW); 4 × fire-tube boilers
- Propulsion: 1 × Propeller; 1 × Ericsson Vibrating-lever steam engine
- Speed: 8 kn (15 km/h; 9.2 mph)
- Complement: 100 officers and enlisted men
- Armament: 2 × 15-inch (381 mm) Dahlgren smoothbore guns
- Armor: Gun turret: 10 in (250 mm); Waterline belt: 5 in (130 mm); Deck: 1.5 in (38 mm); Pilot house: 10 in (250 mm)

USS Catawba was a single-turreted Canonicus-class monitor built for the Union Navy during the American Civil War. Completed shortly after the end of the war, Catawba was laid up until sold to her builders in 1868, and then resold to the Peruvian Navy. Renamed BAP Atahualpa, the ship participated in the defense of the main port of Peru, Callao, during the War of the Pacific. When the city of Lima was taken by Chilean troops in 1881, she was scuttled to prevent her capture. Atahualpa was later refloated and used as a storage hulk until scrapped in the early 20th century.

== Design ==
Catawba was 235 ft (72 m) long overall, had a beam of 43 ft 8 in (13.31 m) and a maximum draft of 13 ft 6 in (4.11 m). Catawba had a tonnage of 1,034 tons burthen and displaced 2,100 long tons (2,100 t). Her crew consisted of 100 officers and enlisted men.

Catawba was powered by a two-cylinder horizontal Ericsson vibrating-lever steam engine that drove one propeller, using steam generated by four Stimers horizontal fire-tube boilers. The 320-indicated-horsepower (240 kW) engine gave the ship a top speed of 8 knots (15 km/h; 9.2 mph). She carried 140–150 long tons (140–150 t) of coal. Catawba's main armament consisted of two smoothbore, muzzle-loading, 15-inch (381 mm) Dahlgren guns mounted in a single gun turret. Each gun weighed approximately 43,000 pounds (20,000 kg). They could fire a 350-pound (158.8 kg) shell up to a range of 2,100 yards (1,900 m) at an elevation of +7°.

The exposed sides of the hull were protected by five layers of 1-inch (25 mm) wrought iron plates, backed by wood. The armor of the gun turret and the pilot house consisted of ten layers of one-inch plates. The ship's deck was protected by armor 1.5 inches (38 mm) thick. A 5-by-15-inch (130 by 380 mm) soft iron band was fitted around the base of the turret to prevent shells and fragments from jamming the turret as had happened during the First Battle of Charleston Harbor in April 1863. The base of the funnel was protected to a height of 6 feet (1.8 m) by 8 inches (200 mm) of armor. A "rifle screen" of 1/2-inch (13 mm) armor 3 feet (0.9 m) high was installed on the top of the turret to protect the crew against Confederate snipers based on a suggestion by Commander Tunis A. M. Craven, captain of her sister ship Tecumseh.

== Construction ==
The contract for Catawba, the first Navy ship to be named after the Catawba River, in North Carolina, was awarded to Alexander Swift & Company; the ship was laid down in 1862, at their Cincinnati, Ohio, shipyard. She was launched on 13 April 1864, and turned over to the US Navy, on 7 June 1865. The ship's construction was delayed by multiple changes ordered while she was being built that reflected battle experience with earlier monitors. This included the rebuilding of the turrets and pilot houses to increase their armor thickness from eight inches to 10 inches (254 mm) and to replace the bolts that secured their armor plates together with rivets to prevent them from being knocked loose by the shock of impact from shells striking the turret. Other changes included deepening the hull by 18 inches (457 mm) to increase the ship's buoyancy, moving the position of the turret to balance the ship's trim and replacing all of the ship's deck armor. Completion of the ship was further delayed by the low depth of the Ohio River, which prevented its movement from Cincinnati, in December 1864, to finish its fitting out. The river finally rose in March 1865, allowing the ship to reach Mound City, Illinois, on 7 March. Catawba was placed in ordinary there after completion, together with two of her sisters.

The ships needed a deep-water berth and were moved opposite Cairo, Illinois, in mid-1865, even though they still had to be anchored in the main channel, where they were often struck by debris, drifting ice, and vulnerable to accidents. Tippecanoe's anchor chain was broken on 27 March 1866, when she was struck by a steamboat towing barges; the monitor collided with Oneota and the two ships were dragged 2 miles (3.2 km) downstream before they could be brought under control. This was a persistent problem and the Navy finally decided to move the ships down to New Orleans in May 1866. In August 1867, the Navy turned over Catawba and Oneota to Swift & Co., contingent on a guarantee that they would be returned in good shape if they could not be sold, and the company began refitting them for Peruvian service.

In October 1867, an agent for Swift & Co. negotiated a deal with Peru, to purchase Catawba and her sister, for a million dollars apiece. Gideon Welles, Secretary of the Navy, initially indicated that the company could repurchase the pair if it refunded the government's costs to build them, but changed his mind and said that he had no authority to do that. Congress debated the issue and ultimately decided that they would be appraised by a board of officers and that the highest competitive bid in equal to or in excess of the appraised value would be accepted. The ship was appraised at $375,000, and sold for that amount, possibly after a rigged bid, on 11 April 1868.

== Atahualpa ==
Catawba was renamed Atahualpa, after the Emperor Atahualpa, the last ruler of the Inca Empire. To prepare the ship for her lengthy voyage to Peru, around Cape Horn, Swift & Co. added a breakwater on the bow, stepped two masts with a fore-and-aft rig, to supplement her engine, and provided closures to make vents and deck openings water tight.

While this was going on, the United States was negotiating with Great Britain over compensation for losses inflicted by British ships knowingly sold to the Confederacy during the Civil War (the Alabama Claims). Peru had been involved in an undeclared war with Spain, (the Chincha Islands War) in 1864–1866, and the US was not willing to prejudice its claims against the United Kingdom, by performing a similar action for a belligerent power. Negotiations over the issue delayed the departure of the two monitors until January 1869, after Peru bought two steamers, Reyes and Marañon to tow the monitors. They had only reached Pensacola, Florida, before machinery breakdowns forced them to wait 30 days for repairs to be completed. En route from Key West to the Bahamas, the ships were separated in heavy weather. Atahualpa reached Great Inagua, in the Bahamas, and was able to resupply, although her officers had to pay for themselves. The ships finally reunited at St. Thomas, in the Virgin Islands, and had to wait for Pachitea to arrive from Peru, to tow Oneota, which had been renamed Manco Cápac, as the monitor had accidentally rammed and sunk Reyes during the storm. While entering Rio de Janeiro, on the night of 15 September, Manco Cápac ran aground; she was refloated the following day, but the damage required three months to repair. The ships were joined by the steam corvette Unión during this time. They reached the Strait of Magellan, on 29 January 1870, and Callao, on 11 May.

Atahualpa was towed from Callao to Iquique, then part of Peru, from 11–22 May 1877, to defend that port from the rebel ironclad Huáscar during the Peruvian Civil War. When the War of the Pacific with Chile began in 1879, Atahualpa was stationed in Callao. On 11 December 1880, the Chilean fleet started firing at Callao, at ranges of up to 4 miles (6.4 km). Atahualpa, escorted by a tug, sortied to fight a long-range battle with the Chilean fleet, but failed to inflict any damage on the Chilean ships. On 16 January 1881, her crew was forced to scuttle the ship to prevent her capture by Chilean forces as they advanced into the city. After the war, the monitor was salvaged and she became a storage hulk until she was finally broken up sometime in the early 20th century.
