= USS Saugus (1863) =

1863 Canonicus-class monitor

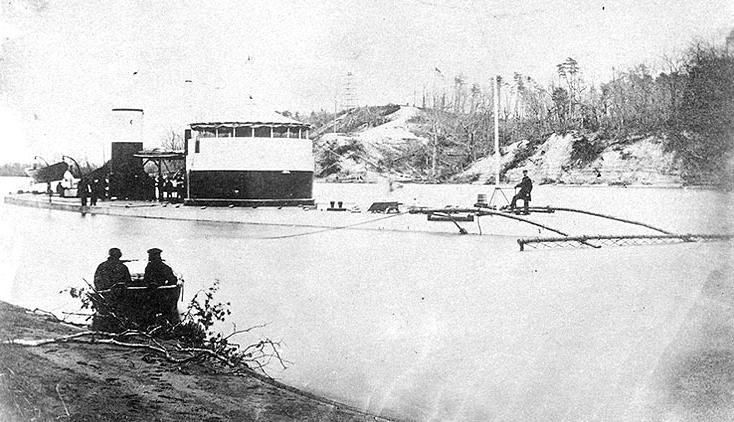
- Saugus with a minesweeping rake

History

United States
- Name: USS Saugus
- Namesake: Saugus, Massachusetts
- Awarded: 1862
- Builder: Harlan & Hollingsworth, Wilmington, Delaware
- Laid down: 1862
- Launched: 16 December 1863
- Commissioned: 7 April 1864
- Decommissioned: 13 June 1865
- Recommissioned: 30 April 1869
- Renamed: USS Centaur 15 June 1869
- Renamed: USS Saugus 10 August 1869
- Decommissioned: 31 December 1870
- Recommissioned: 9 November 1872
- Decommissioned: 9 March 1874
- Recommissioned: 10 October 1874
- Decommissioned: 8 October 1877
- Fate: Sold, 15 May 1891

General characteristics
- Class & type: Canonicus-class monitor
- Displacement: 2,100 long tons (2,100 t)
- Length: 223 ft (68.0 m)
- Beam: 43 ft 4 in (13.2 m)
- Draft: 13 ft 6 in (4.1 m)
- Installed power: 320 ihp (240 kW); 2 × Stimers fire-tube boilers
- Propulsion: 1 × Propeller; 1 × Vibrating-lever steam engine
- Speed: 8 knots (15 km/h; 9.2 mph)
- Complement: 100 officers and enlisted men
- Armament: 2 × 15-inch (381 mm) smoothbore Dahlgren guns
- Armor: Gun turret: 10 in (254 mm); Waterline belt: 5 in (127 mm); Deck: 1.5 in (38 mm); Pilot house: 10 in (254 mm)

USS Saugus was a single-turreted Canonicus-class monitor built for the Union Navy during the American Civil War. The vessel was assigned to the James River Flotilla of the North Atlantic Blockading Squadron upon completion in April 1864. The ship spent most of her time stationed up the James River where she could support operations against Richmond and defend against a sortie by the Confederate ironclads of the James River Squadron. She engaged Confederate artillery batteries during the year and later participated in both attacks on Fort Fisher, defending the approaches to Wilmington, North Carolina, in December 1864 – January 1865. Saugus returned to the James River after the capture of Fort Fisher and remained there until Richmond, Virginia, was occupied in early April.

A few days later, the monitor was transferred to Washington, D.C., and used to temporarily incarcerate some of the suspected conspirators after the assassination of President Lincoln. She was decommissioned in June and recommissioned in early 1869 for service in the Caribbean and off the coast of Florida. Saugus was again recommissioned in late 1872 and generally remained active until late 1877. She was condemned in 1886 and sold for scrap in 1891.

== Description and construction ==
The ship was 223 feet (68.0 m) long overall, had a beam of 43 feet 4 inches (13.2 m) and had a maximum draft of 13 feet 6 inches (4.1 m). Saugus displaced 2,100 long tons (2,100 t). Her crew consisted of 100 officers and enlisted men.

Saugus was powered by a two-cylinder horizontal vibrating-lever steam engine that drove one propeller using steam generated by two Stimers horizontal fire-tube boilers. The 320-indicated-horsepower (240 kW) engine gave the ship a top speed of 8 knots (15 km/h; 9.2 mph). She carried 140–150 long tons (140–150 t) of coal. Saugus's main armament consisted of two smoothbore, muzzle-loading, 15-inch (381 mm) Dahlgren guns mounted in a single gun turret. Each gun weighed approximately 43,000 pounds (20,000 kg). They could fire a 350-pound (158.8 kg) shell up to a range of 2,100 yards (1,900 m) at an elevation of +7°.

The exposed sides of the hull were protected by five layers of 1-inch (25 mm) wrought iron plates, backed by wood. The armor of the gun turret and the pilot house consisted of ten layers of one-inch plates. The ship's deck was protected by armor 1.5 inches (38 mm) thick. A 5-by-15-inch (130 by 380 mm) soft iron band was fitted around the base of the turret to prevent shells and fragments from jamming the turret as had happened to earlier monitors during the First Battle of Charleston Harbor in April 1863. The base of the funnel was protected to a height of 6 feet (1.8 m) by 8 inches (200 mm) of armor. A "rifle screen" of 1/2-inch (13 mm) armor 3 feet (0.9 m) high was installed on the top of the turret to protect the crew against Confederate snipers based on a suggestion by Commander Tunis A. M. Craven, captain of her sister ship Tecumseh.

The contract for Saugus, the first Navy ship to be named Saugus after the town of Saugus, Massachusetts, was awarded to Harlan & Hollingsworth; the ship was laid down in 1862 at their Wilmington, Delaware, shipyard. She was launched on 14 December 1863 and commissioned on 7 April 1864 with Commander Edmund R. Colhoun in command. The ship's construction was delayed by multiple changes ordered while she was being built that reflected battle experience with earlier monitors. This included the rebuilding of the turrets and pilot houses to increase their armor thickness from 8 inches (203 mm) to 10 inches and to replace the bolts that secured their armor plates together with rivets to prevent them from being knocked loose by the shock of impact from shells striking the turret. Other changes included deepening the hull by 18 inches (457 mm) to increase the ship's buoyancy, moving the position of the turret to balance the ship's trim and replacing all of the ship's deck armor. As far as is known the ship was not modified after her completion.

== Service ==
Saugus was assigned to the James River Flotilla and arrived at Fort Monroe on 1 May. By 22 May, the ship was deployed with her sisters Canonicus and Tecumseh on the James River where they protected the transports of Major General Benjamin Butler's Army of the James, supplying the army as it operated on the south bank of the river during the Bermuda Hundred Campaign. On 21 June, Commander Craven of the Tecumseh spotted a line of breastworks that the Confederates were building at Howlett's Farm and his ship opened fire at the workers. The Confederates replied with a battery of four guns near the breastworks and Saugus and Canonicus joined in the bombardment. A half-hour later, Confederate ships near Dutch Gap joined in, but their fire was ineffective because they were firing blindly at the Union monitors. During the engagement, Saugus fired thirty-six 15-inch shells and was hit once by a Confederate shell that struck the deck and ricocheted into the turret; no one was wounded or killed during the engagement. Eight days later, Saugus and the side-wheel gunboat Hunchback engaged a battery at Deep Bottom Creek. The same pair of ships engaged another battery on Four Mile Creek on 30 June and 1 July.

Saugus was still under repair at the Norfolk Navy Yard in early September when she received orders to proceed with Canonicus and the gunboats Glaucus and Juniata to Port Royal, South Carolina, and there await Admiral David Farragut, the prospective commander of the North Atlantic Blockading Squadron, in anticipation of an attack on Fort Fisher. This deployment was cancelled on 19 September when poor health caused Farragut to decline the appointment. The ship returned to the James and resumed supporting the Union Army. In an engagement with Howlett's Battery on 5 December, Saugus was hit twice. One of the shots from a 8-inch (200 mm) Brooke rifle disabled her turret temporarily when it cracked an armor plate and broke a number of 2-inch (51 mm) bolts. The monitor ran aground on 14 December and she was refloated the following day. Saugus was repaired at Norfolk and she was then towed by the gunboat Nereus. They departed on 22 December and arrived off Fort Fisher on Christmas Eve. The next day, Saugus joined the bombardment of the Confederate fortifications from a range of 800 yards (730 m). Colhoun reported that he saw one Confederate gun dismounted by his ship's shells; Saugus fired 64 shells during the day. After Butler ordered his men re-embarked onto their transports on 26 December, the monitor was towed to Beaufort, South Carolina, by the gunboat Quaker City.

Towed by the side-wheel gunboat Alabama, Saugus arrived back at Fort Fisher on 13 January 1865. Together with her sisters Canonicus and Mahopac, the double-turreted monitor Onondaga and the armored frigate New Ironsides, she bombarded the fort for three days until it was captured by Union troops. Despite the bursting of one of her guns on 13 January, which wounded one crewman, the ship fired 212 shells during the battle. Saugus was hit 11 times, cracking armor plates on her pilothouse and turret in addition to breaking bolts, but she was not badly damaged. Nonetheless, the monitor was ordered to return to Norfolk for repairs on 16 January, towed by the sidewheel gunboat Rhode Island. On 23 January, as the ship was en route for the Washington Navy Yard for repairs, the Confederate James River Squadron attempted to slip through the obstructions at Trent's Reach for an attack on the Union gunboats and transports, but they were repulsed before Saugus reached City Point four days later.

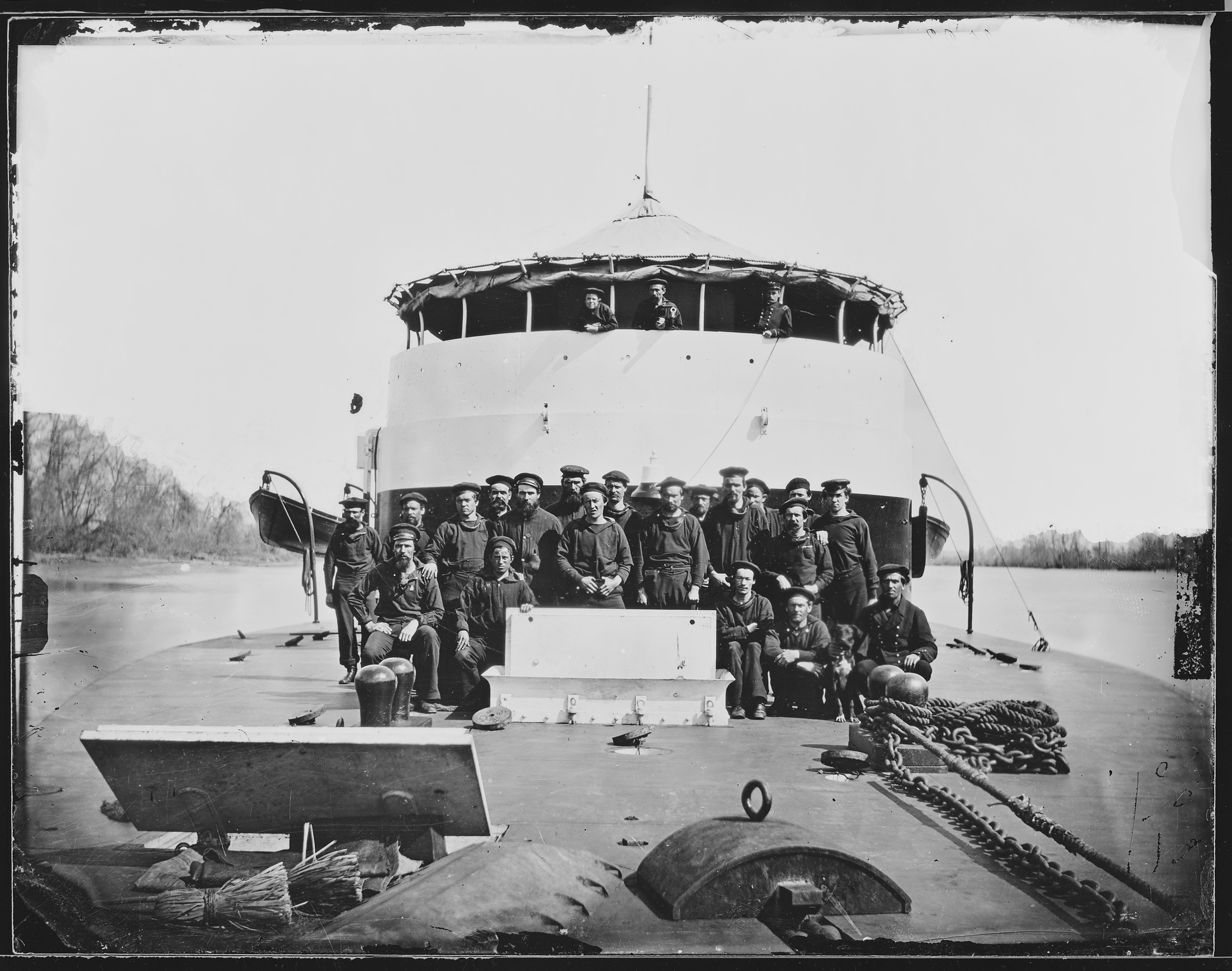
Saugus's crew posing for the camera, probably on the James River in early 1865

Saugus remained on the James for the next month and contributed boats for clearing the river of "torpedoes" after the Confederate ships were scuttled on the night of 2/3 April and Richmond occupied. On 5 April, the ship, now under the command of Lieutenant B. F. Day, and Mahopac were ordered report to the Washington Navy Yard. After the assassination of President Abraham Lincoln on 15 April, eight of the suspected conspirators were incarcerated aboard Saugus and the monitor Montauk. On 30 April, they were transferred off the ships to the Arsenal Penitentiary.

== Post-war operations ==
Saugus was decommissioned and laid up at Washington, D. C., on 13 June 1865. Recommissioned on 30 April 1869, the monitor steamed to Cuba to investigate reports of mistreatment of US citizens during a revolt there. She then patrolled along the Florida coast until she was laid up at Key West, Florida, on the last day of 1870. During this time, the ship was renamed Centaur on 15 June 1869, but resumed her original name on 10 August 1869. After being towed to Philadelphia, Pennsylvania, for repairs, Saugus was recommissioned there on 9 November 1872 and was based at Key West until transferred to Port Royal, South Carolina in 1876. During this period the ship was out of commission from 9 March to 10 October 1874. Saugus returned to Washington in 1877 and was decommissioned there on 8 October. She was condemned in 1886 and sold for scrap on 25 May 1891.
