= USS Manhattan (1863) =

Canonicus-class monitor

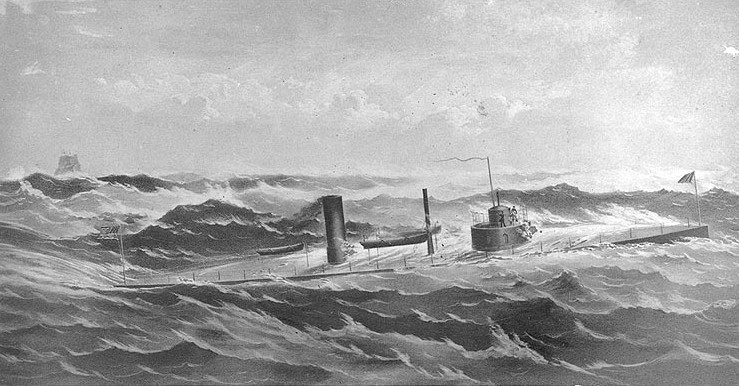
- A contemporary lithograph of Manhattan at sea

History

United States
- Name: USS Manhattan
- Namesake: Manhattan
- Ordered: 15 September 1862
- Builder: Perine, Secor & Co.
- Laid down: 1862
- Launched: 14 October 1863
- Commissioned: 6 June 1864
- Decommissioned: 1877
- Renamed: USS Neptune, 15 June – 10 August 1869
- Stricken: 14 December 1901
- Fate: Sold to be broken up, 24 March 1902

General characteristics
- Type: Canonicus-class monitor
- Displacement: 2,100 long tons (2,100 t)
- Tons burthen: 1,034 tons (bm)
- Length: 223 ft (68.0 m)
- Beam: 43 ft 4 in (13.2 m)
- Draft: 13 ft 6 in (4.1 m)
- Installed power: 320 ihp (240 kW); 2 × Stimers fire-tube boilers
- Propulsion: 1 × Propeller; 1 × Vibrating-lever steam engine
- Speed: 8 knots (15 km/h; 9.2 mph)
- Complement: 100 officers and enlisted men
- Armament: 2 × 15-inch (381 mm) smoothbore Dahlgren guns
- Armor: Gun turret: 10 in (254 mm); Waterline belt: 5 in (127 mm); Deck: 1.5 in (38 mm); Pilot house: 10 in (254 mm)

USS Manhattan was a single-turreted Canonicus-class monitor built for the Union Navy during the American Civil War. After commissioning in 1864 the ship was assigned to the West Gulf Blockading Squadron and participated in the Battle of Mobile Bay. At the end of the battle, Manhattan took the surrender of the Confederate casemate ironclad ram Tennessee. She bombarded Fort Morgan during the Siege of Fort Morgan and later blockaded the mouth of the Red River until the end of the war.

The ship was placed in reserve after the end of the war and Manhattan was only occasionally recommissioned before being sold for scrap in 1902.

== Description and construction ==
The ship was 223 feet (68.0 m) long overall, had a beam of 43 feet 4 inches (13.2 m) and had a maximum draft of 13 feet 6 inches (4.1 m). Manhattan had a tonnage of 1,034 tons burthen and displaced 2,100 long tons (2,100 t). Her crew consisted of 100 officers and enlisted men.

Manhattan was powered by a two-cylinder horizontal vibrating-lever steam engine that drove one propeller using steam generated by two Stimers horizontal fire-tube boilers. The 320-indicated-horsepower (240 kW) engine gave the ship a top speed of 8 knots (15 km/h; 9.2 mph). She carried 140–150 long tons (140–150 t) of coal. Manhattan's main armament consisted of two smoothbore, muzzle-loading, 15-inch (381 mm) Dahlgren guns mounted in a single gun turret. Each gun weighed approximately 43,000 pounds (20,000 kg). They could fire a 350-pound (158.8 kg) shell up to a range of 2,100 yards (1,900 m) at an elevation of +7°.

The exposed sides of the hull were protected by five layers of 1-inch (25 mm) wrought iron plates, backed by wood. The armor of the gun turret and the pilot house consisted of ten layers of one-inch plates. The ship's deck was protected by armor 1.5 inches (38 mm) thick. A 5-by-15-inch (130 by 380 mm) soft iron band was fitted around the base of the turret to prevent shells and fragments from jamming the turret as had happened during the First Battle of Charleston Harbor in April 1863. The base of the funnel was protected to a height of 6 feet (1.8 m) by 8 inches (200 mm) of armor. A "rifle screen" of 1/2-inch (13 mm) armor 3 feet (0.9 m) high was installed on the top of the turret to protected the crew against Confederate snipers based on a suggestion by Commander Tunis A. M. Craven, captain of her sister ship Tecumseh.

The contract for Manhattan, named after the Manhattan tribe of Indians that inhabited the island of the same name, was awarded to Perine, Secor & Co.; the ship was laid down in 1862 by the primary subcontractor Joseph Colwell at his Jersey City, New Jersey, shipyard. She was launched on 14 October 1863 and commissioned on 6 June 1864 with Commander J. W. A. Nicholson in command. The ship's construction was delayed by multiple changes ordered while she was being built that reflected battle experience with earlier monitors. This included the rebuilding of the turrets and pilot houses to increase their armor thickness from 8 inches (203 mm) to 10 inches and to replace the bolts that secured their armor plates together with rivets to prevent them from being knocked loose by the shock of impact from shells striking the turret. Other changes included deepening the hull by 18 inches (457 mm) to increase the ship's buoyancy, moving the position of the turret to balance the ship's trim and replacing all of the ship's deck armor.

The only known modification after the ship's completion was the addition of a hurricane deck between the turret and the funnel sometime after the end of the Civil War.

== Civil War service ==
After commissioning, Manhattan steamed for the Gulf of Mexico and arrived at the Pensacola Navy Yard on 7 July, towed by the side-wheel gunboat Bienville. She required nearly two weeks to resupply and to repair damage from two small fires that started after her arrival. The ship reached Mobile Bay on 20 July, again towed by Bienville, where it joined the West Gulf Blockading Squadron.

Shortly after Tecumseh's arrival on 4 August, Rear Admiral David G. Farragut, the squadron commander, briefed his captains on his plan for the next day's battle. Manhattan and Tecumseh were to keep the ironclad ram Tennessee away from the vulnerable wooden ships while they were passing the fort and then sink her. The river monitors Winnebago and Chickasaw were to engage Fort Morgan until all of the wooden ships had passed. The four monitors would form the starboard column of ships, closest to Fort Morgan, with Tecumseh in the lead, while the wooden ships formed a separate column to port. The eastern side of the channel closest to Fort Morgan was free of obstacles, but "torpedoes", as mines were then known, were known to be present west of a prominent black buoy in the channel.

About 07:40, Tecumseh attempted to close with the Tennessee by passing through the minefield, but struck a "torpedo" and capsized within 90 seconds. Manhattan continued to engage the fort until all but the last pair of wooden ships had cleared the obstacles. She closed to a range of about 200 yards (180 m) from the Confederate ironclad and began firing with her one operable gun; a flake of iron had fallen into the vent hole of one of her guns and was jammed in place. One of her shots hit the Tennessee and broke the armor and its wooden backing so that daylight was visible through the side of the casemate. The shot failed to penetrate, and netting laid on the inside of the backing caught all of the splinters so that no one was injured. During the battle Manhattan fired a total of 11 shots, six at Tennessee and five at Fort Morgan. Nicholson claimed four hits, including the shot that broke the Tennessee's steering chains and another that jammed her stern gun port shutter in the closed position. The monitor was hit nine times during the battle, but sustained no significant damage or casualties.

Manhattan had closed to about 50 yards (46 m) distance when Nicholson spotted a white flag of surrender hanging from a boat hook on top of the Tennessee's casemate and ordered his gunners to cease fire. Nicholson confirmed the Confederate ship's surrender verbally and ran the monitor alongside so that one of his officers could seize the ironclad's colors, which was lying in her scuppers. Unbeknownst to Nicholson, Commander James D. Johnston, captain of the Tennessee, intended to surrender to the wooden gunboat Ossipee and ignored Manhattan and her captain.

The ship subsequently participated in the bombardment of Fort Morgan, which surrendered 23 August. In November, Manhattan sailed to New Orleans, Louisiana and later to the mouth of the Red River, where she remained until the end of the war. Manhattan then steamed to New Orleans where she was laid up in ordinary in August 1865. On 15 June 1869, the ship was renamed Neptune, although she resumed her original name on 10 August.

== Post-war service ==
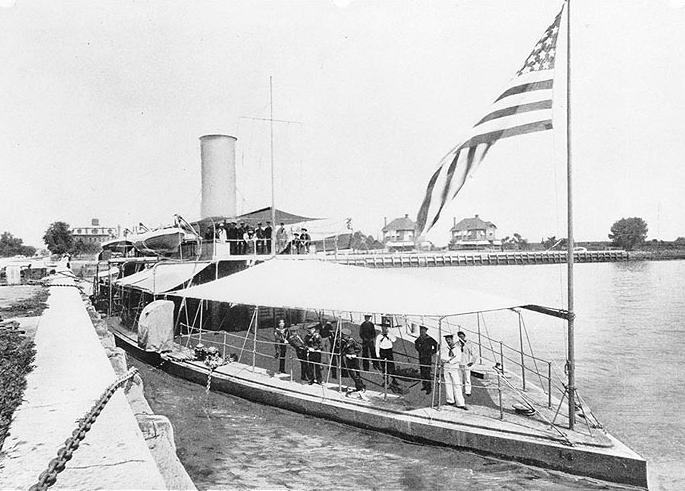
Manhattan on the James River during the 1880s

In 1870 Manhattan was transferred to Key West, Florida, and then sailed to Philadelphia, Pennsylvania where she was refitted in 1872–73. Recommissioned on 19 November 1873, the ship returned to Key West for fleet maneuvers and then proceeded to Pensacola, Florida. Manhattan departed the west coast of Florida and sailed to Port Royal, South Carolina, on 25 April 1876. The ship patrolled off the Carolinas until June 1877, when she sailed to Norfolk, Virginia. The following year she was towed up the James River and moored at Brandon, Virginia. Manhattan was transferred to City Point, Virginia, in 1881 and then to Richmond, Virginia. The ship was taken to Philadelphia and laid up at League Island in 1888, where she remained for the rest of her career. Manhattan was struck from the Navy List on 14 December 1901 and sold on 24 March 1902 for breaking up.
