= USS Canonicus (1863) =

1863 Canonicus-class monitor

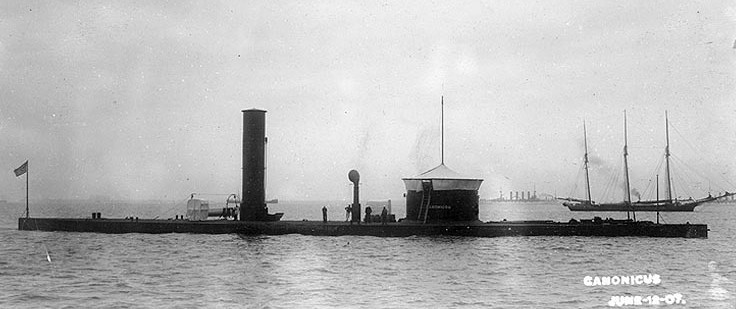
- USS Canonicus in Hampton Roads, Virginia, 12 June 1907

History

United States
- Name: Canonicus; Scylla
- Namesake: Canonicus; Scylla
- Builder: Harrison Loring, Boston, Massachusetts
- Laid down: 1862
- Launched: 1 August 1863
- Commissioned: 16 April 1864
- Decommissioned: 30 June 1869
- Renamed: Scylla, 15 June 1869; Canonicus, 10 August 1869
- Recommissioned: 22 January 1872
- Decommissioned: 1877
- Fate: Sold, 19 February 1908

General characteristics
- Class & type: Canonicus-class monitor
- Displacement: 2,100 long tons (2,100 t)
- Tons burthen: 1,034 tons (bm)
- Length: 224 ft (68 m)
- Beam: 43 ft 4 in (13.21 m)
- Draft: 13 ft 6 in (4.11 m)
- Installed power: 320 ihp (240 kW); 2 × Stimers fire-tube boilers
- Propulsion: 1 × Propeller; 1 × Ericsson Vibrating-lever steam engine
- Speed: 8 kn (15 km/h; 9.2 mph)
- Complement: 100 officers and enlisted men
- Armament: 2 × 15-inch (381 mm) Dahlgren smoothbore guns
- Armor: Gun turret: 10 in (250 mm); Waterline belt: 5 in (130 mm); Deck: 1.5 in (38 mm); Pilot house: 10 in (250 mm)

USS Canonicus was a single-turret monitor built for the United States Navy during the American Civil War, the lead ship of her class. The ship spent most of her first year in service stationed up the James River, where she could support operations against Richmond and defend against a sortie by the Confederate ironclads of the James River Squadron. She engaged Confederate artillery batteries during the year and later participated in both attacks on Fort Fisher, defending the approaches to Wilmington, North Carolina, from December 1864 to January 1865.

Canonicus was transferred to the South Atlantic Blockading Squadron at Charleston, South Carolina, after the capture of Fort Fisher in January, and helped to capture one blockade runner. She was sent to Havana, Cuba, to search for the Confederate ironclad CSS Stonewall and became one of the first ironclads to visit a foreign port. The ship was intermittently in commission from 1872 until she was permanently decommissioned in 1877. Canonicus was exhibited at the Jamestown Exposition of 1907, before she was sold for scrap the following year.

== Design ==
The Canonicus class was an enlarged and improved version of the preceding Passaic class. They were 224 feet (68.3 m) long overall, had a beam of 43 feet 4 inches (13.2 m) and had a maximum draft of 13 feet 6 inches (4.1 m). Canonicus had a tonnage of 1,034 tons burthen and displaced 2,100 long tons (2,100 t). Her crew consisted of 100 officers and enlisted men.

Canonicus was powered by a two-cylinder horizontal Ericsson vibrating-lever steam engine that drove one propeller using steam generated by two Stimers horizontal fire-tube boilers. The 320-indicated-horsepower (240 kW) engine gave the ship a top speed of 8 knots (15 km/h; 9.2 mph). She carried 140–150 long tons (140–150 t) of coal. Canonicus's main armament consisted of two smoothbore, muzzle-loading, 15-inch (381 mm) Dahlgren guns mounted in a single gun turret. Each gun weighed approximately 43,000 pounds (20,000 kg). They could fire a 350-pound (158.8 kg) shell up to a range of 2,100 yards (1,900 m) at an elevation of +7°.

The exposed sides of the hull were protected by five layers of 1-inch (25 mm) wrought iron plates, backed by wood. The armor of the gun turret and the pilot house consisted of ten layers of one-inch plates. The ship's deck was protected by armor 1.5 inches (38 mm) thick. A 5-by-15-inch (130 by 380 mm) soft iron band was fitted around the base of the turret to prevent shells and fragments from jamming the turret as had happened during the First Battle of Charleston Harbor in April 1863. The base of the funnel was protected to a height of 6 feet (1.8 m) by 8 inches (200 mm) of armor. A "rifle screen" of 1/2-inch (13 mm) armor 3 feet (0.9 m) high was installed on the top of the turret to protect the crew against Confederate snipers based on a suggestion by Commander Tunis A. M. Craven, captain of her sister ship Tecumseh.

== Construction ==
The contract for Canonicus, the first Navy ship to be named for the chief of the Narragansett Indians, was awarded to Harrison Loring; the ship was laid down in 1862, at their Boston, Massachusetts, shipyard. She was launched on 1 August 1863, and commissioned on 16 April 1864, with Commander E. G. Parrott, in command. The ship's construction was delayed by multiple changes ordered while she was being built that reflected battle experience with earlier monitors. This included the rebuilding of the turrets and pilot houses to increase their armor thickness from 8 inches (203 mm) to 10 inches, and to replace the bolts that secured their armor plates together with rivets, to prevent them from being knocked loose by the shock of impact from shells striking the turret. Other changes included deepening the hull by 18 inches (457 mm) to increase the ship's buoyancy, moving the position of the turret to balance the ship's trim, and replacing all of the ship's deck armor. As far as is known the ship was not modified after her completion.

== Service history ==
Canonicus sailed from Boston, on 22 April 1864, and arrived at Newport News, Virginia, on 3 May, for service with the James River Flotilla. She reached the mouth of the Appomattox River, by 5 May. By 22 May, the ship was deployed with her sisters Saugus and Tecumseh on the James River, where they protected the transports of Major General Benjamin Butler's Army of the James, supplying the army as it operated on the south bank of the river during the Bermuda Hundred Campaign. On 21 June, Commander Craven, of Tecumseh, spotted a line of breastworks that the Confederates were building at Howlett's Farm, and his ship opened fire at the workers. The Confederates replied with a battery of four guns near the breastworks and Saugus and Canonicus joined in the bombardment. A half-hour later, Confederate ships near Dutch Gap joined in, but their fire was ineffective because they were firing blindly at the Union monitors. During the engagement Canonicus fired forty 15-inch shells and was hit twice by Confederate shells. One shell pierced the upper part of the funnel and the other struck the deck and ricocheted into the turret; no one was wounded or killed during the engagement. The ship dueled with Howlett's Battery on 5 and 6 December, firing 46 shells without being hit in return. The only damage sustained was from the muzzle blast of the right gun that forced the armor at the gun port out about one inch (25 mm) and broke a number of bolts.

Reassigned to the North Atlantic Blockading Squadron, the monitor arrived at Beaufort, North Carolina, accompanied by the sidewheel gunboat Rhode Island, on 15 December 1864, and took part in the attacks on Fort Fisher, North Carolina. In the first engagement on 24–25 December, Canonicus anchored at ranges from 900–1,200 yd (820–1,100 m) and fired 144 rounds, Lieutenant Commander George Belknap claiming to have dismounted two Confederate guns. The ship was hit four times, but suffered no casualties and no significant damage. On 13–15 January 1865, during the second attack, Canonicus fired 279 shells at the fort, most on the first day, again claiming to have dismounted two guns. She was hit at least 38 times in return but was only lightly damaged, and three crewmen were wounded. The ship's flag was twice shot away and replaced each time by Quartermaster Daniel D. Stevens. Stevens was later awarded the Medal of Honor for his actions.

On 17 January 1865, Canonicus, towed by the steam sloop-of-war Tuscarora, was ordered to join the South Atlantic Blockading Squadron and arrived at Charleston, on 19 January. The following month, Canonicus and the monitors Monadnock and Catskill captured a blockade runner that had run aground on Sullivan's Island, on the night of 18 February. The ship, towed by the steamer Fahkee, together with Monadnock and other ships steamed to Havana, Cuba, in late May, in search of CSS Stonewall and arrived there after the ship had been turned over to the Spanish authorities by her captain. The two monitors were the first American ironclads to arrive at a foreign port. They returned to the United States, on 6 June.

Canonicus arrived at the Philadelphia Navy Yard, on 25 June 1869, and was decommissioned five days later. The ship was renamed Scylla on 15 June 1869, but resumed her former name on 10 August 1869. She was recommissioned on 22 January 1872, and cruised the coastal waters of the Atlantic and Gulf of Mexico whenever she was in commission. Canonicus was finally decommissioned in 1877, at Pensacola, Florida. The elderly monitor was towed to Hampton Roads, Virginia, in mid-1907, as an exhibit during the Jamestown Exposition as the last survivor of the Civil War monitors. Canonicus was sold for scrap on 19 February 1908.
