= USS Tecumseh (1863) =

Canonicus-class monitor

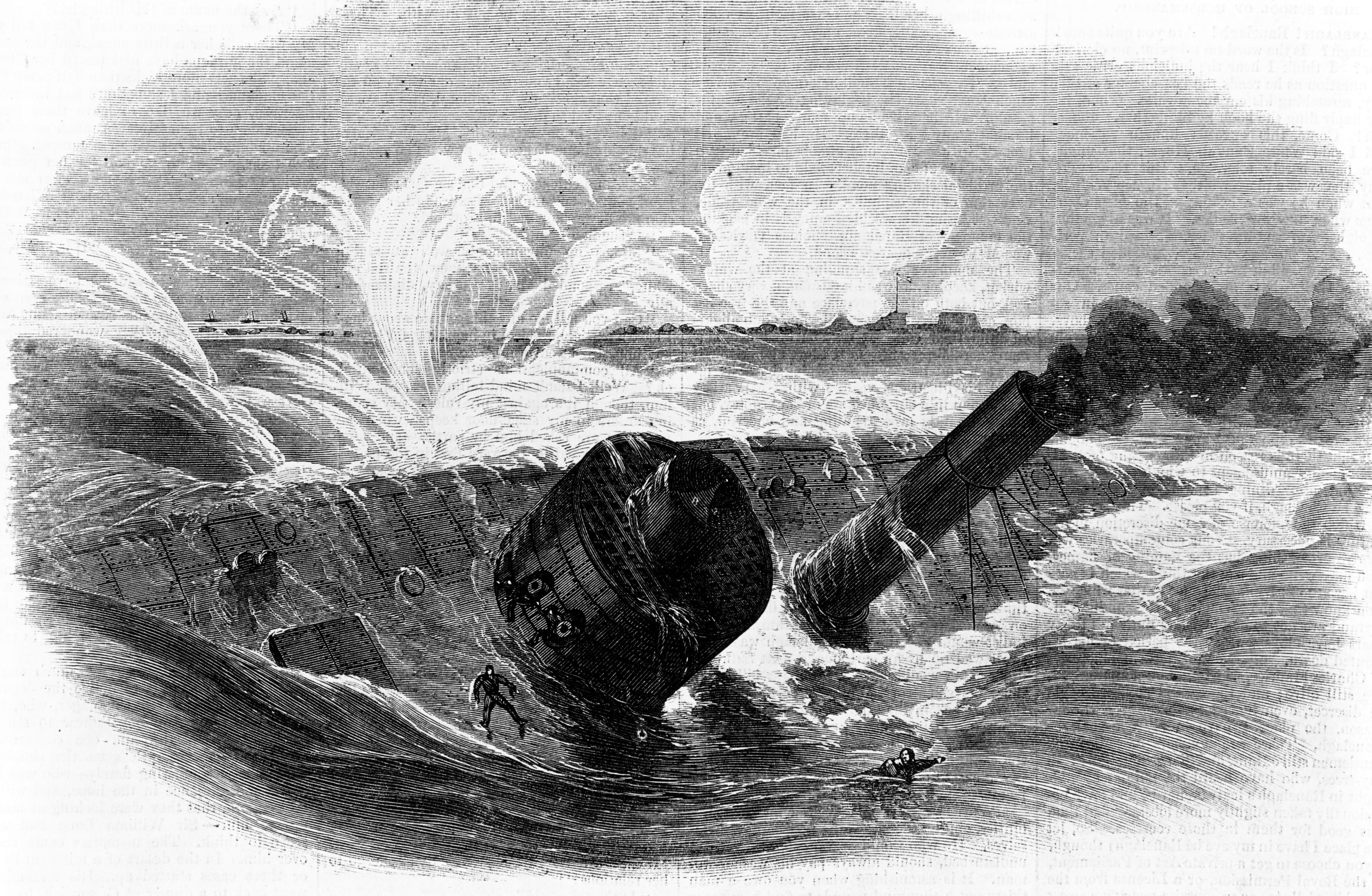
- Tecumseh strikes a mine and sinks

History

United States
- Name: USS Tecumseh
- Namesake: Tecumseh
- Ordered: 15 September 1862
- Builder: Charles Secor & Co., Jersey City, New Jersey
- Laid down: 1862
- Launched: 12 September 1863
- Commissioned: 19 April 1864
- Fate: Sunk during the Battle of Mobile Bay, 5 August 1864

General characteristics
- Type: Canonicus-class monitor
- Displacement: 2,100 long tons (2,134 t)
- Tons burthen: 1,034 tons (bm)
- Length: 223 ft (68.0 m)
- Beam: 43 ft 4 in (13.2 m)
- Draft: 13 ft 6 in (4.1 m)
- Installed power: 320 ihp (240 kW); 2 × Stimers fire-tube boilers
- Propulsion: 1 × Propeller; 1 × Vibrating-lever steam engine
- Speed: 8 knots (15 km/h; 9.2 mph)
- Complement: 100 officers and enlisted men
- Armament: 2 × 15-inch (381 mm) smoothbore Dahlgren guns
- Armor: Gun turret: 10 in (254 mm); Waterline belt: 5 in (127 mm); Deck: 1.5 in (38 mm); Pilot house: 10 in (254 mm)
- U.S.S. Tecumseh
- U.S. National Register of Historic Places
- Location within Alabama Location within the United States
- Nearest city: Fort Morgan, Alabama
- Coordinates: 30°13′54″N 88°1′33″W
- Area: 0 acres (0 ha)
- Built: 1862
- Architect: Charles A. Secor & Co.
- NRHP reference No.: 75000306
- Added to NRHP: 14 May 1975

USS Tecumseh was a Canonicus-class monitor built for the United States Navy during the American Civil War. Although intended for forthcoming operations against Confederate fortifications guarding Mobile Bay with Rear Admiral David Farragut's West Gulf Blockading Squadron, Tecumseh was temporarily assigned to the James River Flotilla in April 1864. The ship helped to plant obstacles in the river and engaged Confederate artillery batteries in June.

Tecumseh was sunk on 5 August during the Battle of Mobile Bay when she struck a mine. The ship capsized and rests upside down northwest of Fort Morgan. The Smithsonian Institution surveyed her wreck in 1967 with the intent of raising it, but ultimately decided against the project when proffered funding was withdrawn. Several other plans to raise the wreck have been made, but all have fallen through.

== Description and construction ==
The ship was 223 feet (68 m) long overall, had a beam of 43 feet 4 inches (13.2 m) and had a maximum draft of 13 feet 6 inches (4.1 m). Tecumseh had a tonnage of 1,034 tons burthen and displaced 2,100 long tons (2,134 t). Her crew consisted of 100 officers and enlisted men.

Tecumseh was powered by a two-cylinder horizontal vibrating-lever steam engine that drove one propeller using steam generated by two Stimers horizontal fire-tube boilers. The 320-indicated-horsepower (240 kW) engine gave the ship a top speed of 8 knots (15 km/h; 9.2 mph). She carried 140–150 long tons (142–152 t) of coal. Tecumseh's main armament consisted of two smoothbore, muzzle-loading, 15-inch (381 mm) Dahlgren guns mounted in a single gun turret. Each gun weighed approximately 43,000 pounds (20,000 kg). They could fire a 350-pound (158.8 kg) shell up to a range of 2,100 yards (1,900 m) at an elevation of +7°.

The exposed sides of the hull were protected by five layers of 1-inch (25 mm) wrought iron plates, backed by wood. The armor of the gun turret and the pilot house consisted of ten layers of one-inch plates. The ship's deck was protected by armor 1.5 inches (38 mm) thick. A 5-by-15-inch (130 by 380 mm) soft iron band was fitted around the base of the turret to prevent shells and fragments from jamming the turret as had happened to the older Passaic-class monitors during the First Battle of Charleston Harbor in April 1863. The base of the funnel was protected to a height of 6 feet (1.8 m) by 8 inches (200 mm) of armor. A "rifle screen" of 1/2-inch (13 mm) armor 3 feet (0.9 m) high was installed on the top of the turret to protected the crew against Confederate snipers based on a suggestion by Commander Tunis A. M. Craven.

The contract for Tecumseh, named after the Indian chief, was awarded to Charles Secor & Co.; the ship was laid down in 1862 by the primary subcontractor Joseph Colwell at his Jersey City, New Jersey shipyard. She was launched on 12 September 1863 and commissioned on 19 April 1864 with Craven in command. The ship's construction was delayed by multiple changes ordered while she was being built that reflected battle experience with earlier monitors. This included the rebuilding of the turrets and pilot houses to increase their armor thickness from 8 inches (203 mm) to 10 inches and to replace the bolts that secured their armor plates together with rivets to prevent them from being knocked loose by the shock of impact from shells striking the turret. Other changes included deepening the hull by 18 inches (457 mm) to increase the ship's buoyancy, moving the position of the turret to balance the ship's trim and replacing all of the ship's deck armor.

== Service ==
After commissioning, the ship was ordered to join the North Atlantic Blockading Squadron at Newport News and arrived there on 28 April. Tecumseh was ordered to protect the transports conveying Major General Benjamin Butler's Army of the James up the James River at the beginning of the Bermuda Hundred Campaign on 4 May. To prevent Confederate warships from coming down from the James, the Union forces blocked the channel in mid-June 1864. Tecumseh sank four hulks and a schooner and laid several boom across the river as part of this effort. On 21 June, Commander Craven spotted a line of breastworks that the enemy was building at Howlett's Farm and the ship opened fire at the workers. The Confederates replied with a battery of four guns near the breastworks and her sisters Canonicus and Saugus joined in the bombardment. A half-hour later, Confederate ships near Dutch Gap joined in, but their fire was ineffective because they were firing blindly at the Union monitors. During the engagement, Tecumseh fired forty-six 15-inch shells and was not hit by any Confederate shells. Craven claimed the destruction of one gun emplacement.

Two days after the battle, Tecumseh sailed down the James for Norfolk, Virginia, but ran aground en route when her wire steering ropes broke after having been burned halfway through by the heat of her boilers. She was refloated four hours later and spend a week in Norfolk making repairs and taking on supplies. On 5 July, the ship got underway for Pensacola, Florida to join the West Gulf Blockading Squadron, towed by the side-wheel gunboats Augusta and Eutaw. The ship's engine had overheated en route and required a week's repairs at Port Royal, South Carolina and Augusta had to turn back with engine problems, but Eutaw and Tecumseh arrived in Pensacola on 28 July. Towed by the side-wheel gunboat Bienville, the monitor arrived off Mobile Bay on the evening of 4 August.

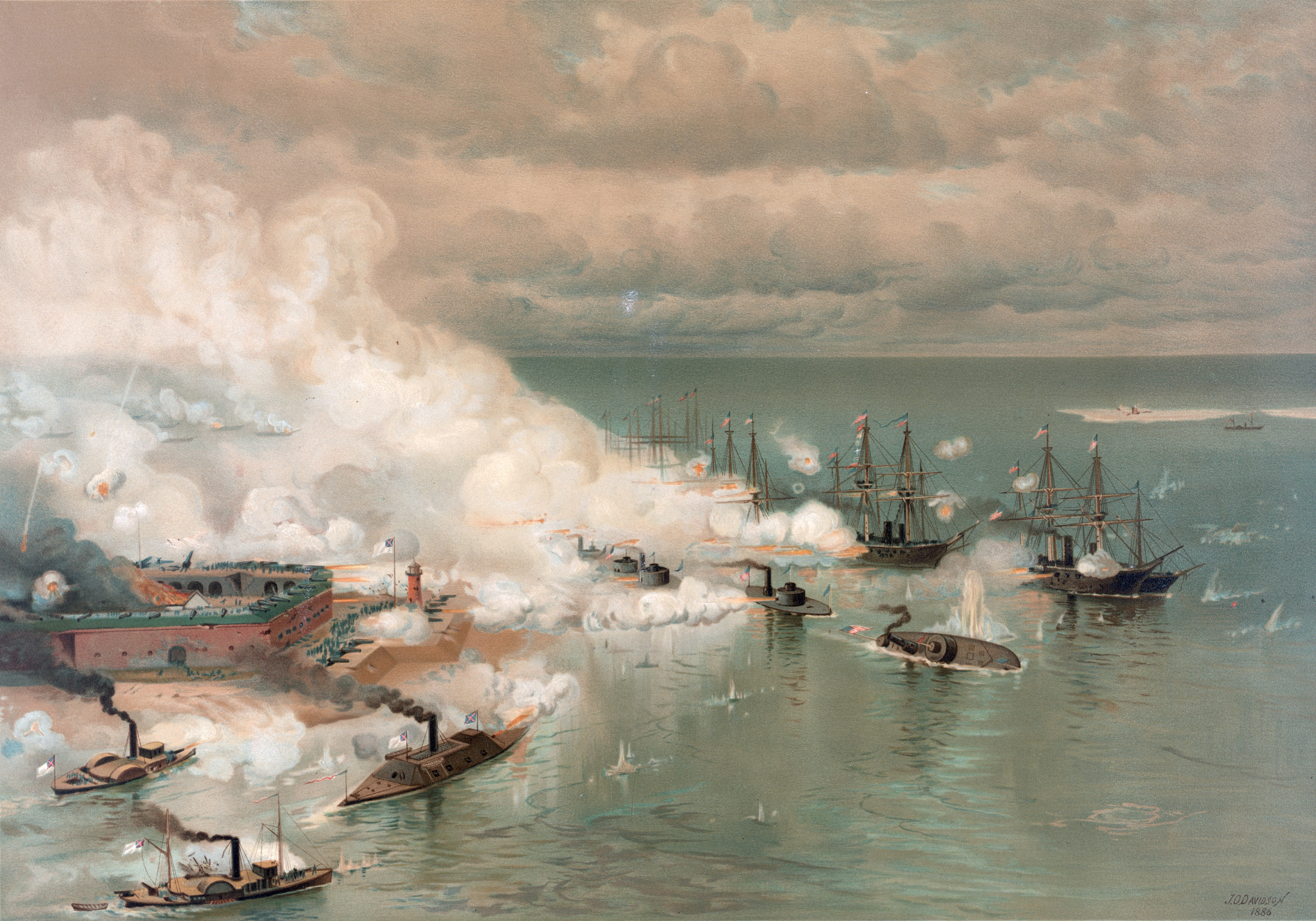
Tecumseh sinking at the Battle of Mobile Bay after striking a "torpedoe"

Farragut briefed Craven on his ship's intended role in the battle. She and her sister Manhattan were to keep the ironclad ram CSS Tennessee away from the vulnerable wooden ships while they were passing Fort Morgan and then sink her. The river monitors Winnebago and Chickasaw were to engage the fort until all of the wooden ships had passed. The four monitors would form the starboard column of ships, closest to Fort Morgan, with Tecumseh in the lead, while the wooden ships formed a separate column to port. The eastern side of the channel closest to Fort Morgan was free of obstacles, but "torpedoes" were known to be present west of a prominent black buoy in the channel.

At 06:47 Tecumseh opened fire on Ft. Morgan's lighthouse to test her guns. The Confederates held their fire until 07:05 when they began to shoot at the ships in both columns. By this time the Confederate ships had positioned themselves across the mouth of the channel, with Tennessee facing the unprotected side, and they started shooting as well. By 07:30 Tecumseh was about 600 yards (550 m) away from Tennessee and Craven did not think that he could intercept the Confederate ironclad before Hartford entered the channel unless he passed through the field of "torpedoes", as mines were called at the time, because of his ship's poor maneuverability. He ordered the pilot to steer directly for Tennessee. Ten minutes later, Tecumseh struck a "torpedo" 100 yards from the Tennessee and sank in less than 30 seconds. Craven and the pilot, John Collins, arrived at the foot of the ladder leading to the main deck simultaneously with water up to their waists. Craven stepped back, saying "After you, pilot", but was unable to follow him to safety before the monitor capsized. Including Craven, 94 of the crew went down with the ship. Commander James Jouett of the gunboat Metacomet dispatched a boat commanded by Acting Ensign Henry C. Nields to rescue any survivors. They successfully rescued ten men, including the pilot, and delivered them to Winnebago. Seven other survivors reached one of Tecumseh's boats and four other men swam ashore and were captured.

== Post-war ==
The ship capsized as she sank and rests upside down in 30 feet (9.1 m) of water some 300 yards (270 m) northwest of Fort Morgan. On 3 August 1873, salvage rights for the wreck of Tecumseh were sold by the Department of the Treasury to James E. Slaughter for $50. After the purchase, Slaughter announced that he intended to use explosives to blast the wreck into salvageable pieces. In 1876, the relatives of the men lost on Tecumseh petitioned Congress to stop the salvage. Congress quickly passed Joint Resolution No. 23 on 15 August directing the Secretary of the Treasury to return the $50 to Slaughter, with 6% interest. The Secretary of the Navy was to assume control of the wreck and was empowered to protect Tecumseh. Congress stipulated that any salvage efforts must provide for the proper removal and burial of the vessel's dead crewmen.

In the mid-1960s, the Smithsonian Institution formed the Tecumseh Project Team, which was intended to raise the ship as the centerpiece of a planned National Armed Forces Museum Park in Washington, D. C. The team found the wreck in February 1967, capsized and buried just off Fort Morgan, but the primary donor was forced to rescind the funding, so the project was suspended. "In a 1993 survey, archaeologists from East Carolina University reported the hull to be covered by a calcareous crust with only nominal surface deterioration present."

In 1974, Jack Friend – a Mobile naval historian – was commissioned to examine the feasibility of raising Tecumseh and concluded that it would cost an estimated $10 million. More modern estimates have determined a salvage and conservation cost of $80 million. Divers from the Smithsonian Institution recovered an anchor, dishes from the ship's dining hall and a variety of other artifacts during their 1967 expedition. Tecumseh's engine room gong was also removed and is currently on display at the Hampton Roads Naval Museum. The wreck site is marked and under United States Coast Guard surveillance pending continued preservation efforts. She is considered a war grave and may not be disturbed without permission of the United States Secretary of the Navy.
