= Kalamazoo-class monitor =

United States Navy's Kalamazoo-class monitors

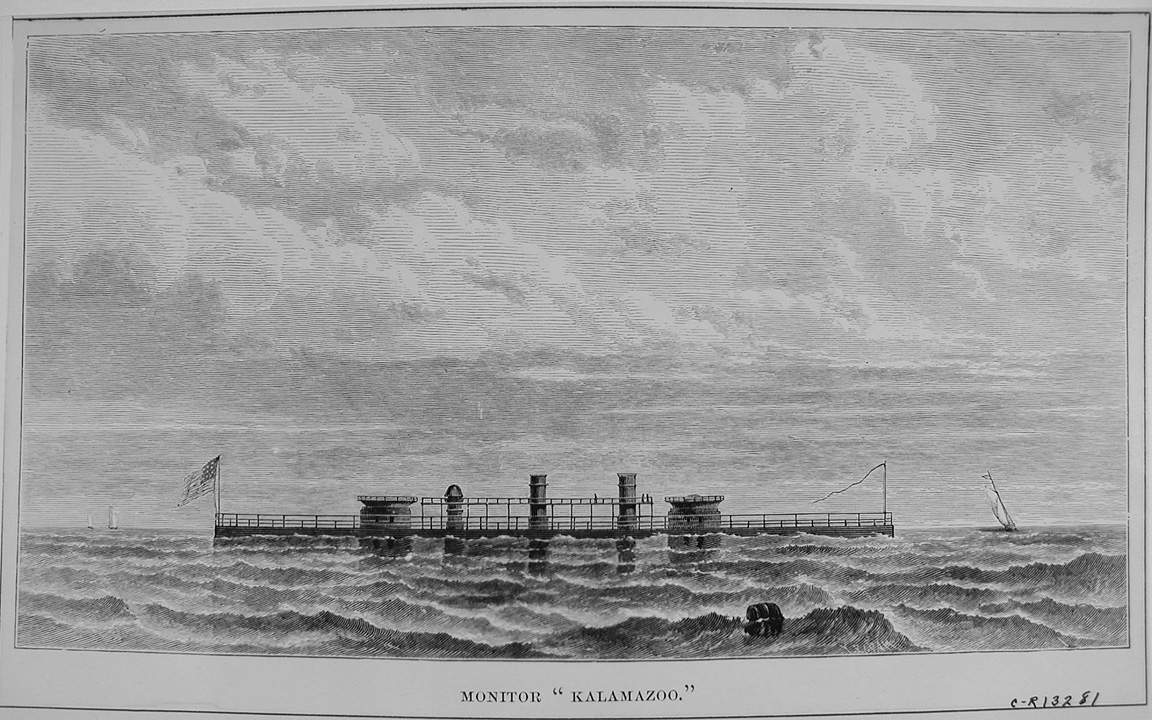
- Engraving of Kalamazoo

Class overview
- Name: Kalamazoo class
- Operators: United States Navy
- Preceded by: Miantonomoh class
- Succeeded by: USS Puritan
- Built: 1863–65
- Planned: 4
- Completed: 0
- Scrapped: 4

General characteristics
- Type: Monitor
- Displacement: 5,600 long tons (5,700 t)
- Tons burthen: 3,200 (bm)
- Length: 345 ft 5 in (105.3 m)
- Beam: 56 ft 8 in (17.3 m)
- Draft: 17 ft 6 in (5.3 m)
- Installed power: 2,000 ihp (1,500 kW) (estimated); 8 × Tubular boilers
- Propulsion: 2 × Shafts; 2 × Direct-acting steam engines
- Speed: 10 knots (19 km/h; 12 mph)
- Armament: 2 × 2 - 15-inch (381 mm) smoothbore Dahlgren guns
- Armor: Gun turret: 10-15 in? (254-381 mm); Hull: 6 in (152 mm); Deck: 3 in (76 mm)

The Kalamazoo-class monitors were a class of ocean-going ironclad monitors begun during the American Civil War. Unfinished by the end of the war, their construction was suspended in November 1865 and the unseasoned wood of their hulls rotted while they were still on the building stocks. If the four ships had been finished they would have been the most seaworthy monitors in the US Navy. One was scrapped in 1874 while the other three were disposed of a decade later.

== Design and description ==
John Lenthall, Chief of the Bureau of Construction and Repair, ordered Benjamin F. Delano, naval constructor at New York City, to design a wooden-hulled ironclad that would carry her armament in two gun turrets. The deck was to be 3 feet (0.9 m) above the waterline and protected by 3 inches (76 mm) of armor. The ship's side armor was to be 10 inches (254 mm) thick, backed by 12–15 inches (305–381 mm) of wood; it was to cover the entire ship's side, down to a depth three feet below the waterline. It should carry enough coal to steam one week at full power with "sufficient speed to make good use of its ram". Gideon Welles, Secretary of the Navy, called them enlarged versions of the Miantonomoh-class monitors with greater speed and "adapted to coast service", meaning more seaworthy.

The Kalamazoo-class ships were 345 feet 5 inches (105.3 m) long overall and had a length between perpendiculars of 332 feet 6 inches (101.3 m). They had a beam of 56 feet 8 inches (17.27 m) and a draft of 17 feet 6 inches (5.3 m). The ships were designed to displace 5,660 long tons (5,750 t) and were 3,200 tons burthen. They were the largest ships to be built in navy shipyards to date.

Their unseasoned wooden hulls were massively reinforced by iron straps as well as iron stanchions to bear the enormous weight of their armor and guns. They retained the typical monitor overhang introduced by John Ericsson, designer of the Monitor, where the upper part of the hull was 42 inches (1,100 mm) wider than the lower part of the hull. The Kalamazoo's wrought iron side armor consisted of two layers of three-inch plates, backed by 21 inches of wood, six feet in height. The outer layer of armor extended 18 inches (460 mm) further below the waterline. The three-inch deck armor rested on 6 inches (152 mm) of wood and was covered in another three inches of wood.

They were powered by two 2-cylinder horizontal direct-acting steam engines, each driving one 15-foot (4.6 m) propellers, using steam generated by eight tubular boilers. (Note: Chesneau & Kolesnik claim that these were Martin boilers.) The engines were rated at 2,000 indicated horsepower (1,500 kW) and designed to reach a top speed of 10 knots (19 km/h; 12 mph). They had a bore of 46.5 inches (1,181 mm) and a stroke of 50 inches (1,270 mm). Two large funnels were positioned between the turrets to handle the combustion gases from the boilers. The Kalamazoos were intended to carry 500 long tons (510 t) of coal.

The ships' main armament consisted of four smoothbore, muzzle-loading, 15-inch (381 mm) Dahlgren guns mounted in two twin-gun turrets. Each gun weighed approximately 43,000 pounds (20,000 kg). They could fire a 350-pound (158.8 kg) shell up to a range of 2,100 yards (1,900 m) at an elevation of +7°. The turrets were protected by 15 inches of armor. (Note: Silverstone claims that their armor was only 10 inches thick.)

== Ships ==
Ship	Builder	Namesake	Renamed	Laid down	Suspended	Scrapped
Kalamazoo	Brooklyn Naval Shipyard, Brooklyn, New York	Kalamazoo River	Colossus, 15 June 1869	1863	17 November 1865	1884
Passaconaway	Portsmouth Naval Shipyard, Kittery, Maine	Mount Passaconaway	Thunderer, 15 June 1869; Massachusetts, 10 August 1869	18 November 1863	17 November 1865	1884
Quinsigamond	Boston Naval Shipyard, Boston, Massachusetts	Lake Quinsigamond	Hercules, 15 June 1869; Oregon, 10 August 1869	15 April 1864	17 November 1865	1884
Shackamaxon (Note: Also spelled Shakamaxon.)	Philadelphia Naval Shipyard, Philadelphia, Pennsylvania	Shackamaxon	Hecla, 15 June 1869; Nebraska, 10 August 1869	late 1863	17 November 1865	January 1874

== Construction and fate ==
Construction of the ships began between late 1863 and early 1864 and they were still being built when the war ended in early 1865. Construction was suspended on all four on 17 November 1865; they remained on the stocks. The ships were renamed, usually twice, in 1869 to conform to several new ship naming conventions. Vice Admiral David D. Porter ordered that Colossus be rebuilt to carry 10 large broadside guns and fitted with iron masts in a ship rig, but this never happened. The unseasoned wood in their hulls quickly began to rot after construction was suspended and they were broken up beginning in 1874. Unusually, Passaconaway was condemned by an Act of Congress on 5 August 1882 before she was finally broken up in 1884.
