= USS Terror =

USS Terror may refer to the following ships operated by the United States Navy:

- Terror, a screw tugboat built in 1861 at St. Louis, Missouri; transferred to the U.S. Navy on 30 September 1862 and renamed USS Ivy (1862)
- USS Terror (1863), a Miantonomoh-class monitor originally commissioned as Agamenticus, 5 May 1864; broken up 1874
- USS Terror (BM-4), an Amphitrite-class monitor; commissioned 15 April 1896 and served in the Spanish–American War and as a training vessel
- USS Terror (CM-5), a minelayer commissioned 15 July 1942 and sold for scrap in 1971
