= USS Tonawanda (1864) =

Miantonomoh-class monitor

- Tonawanda in the Severn River while serving as a training ship c. 1870

History

United States
- Name: Tonawanda
- Namesake: Tonawanda Creek, New York
- Builder: Philadelphia Navy Yard, Philadelphia, Pennsylvania
- Laid down: 1863
- Launched: 6 May 1864
- Commissioned: 12 October 1865
- Decommissioned: 22 December 1865
- Recommissioned: 23 October 1866
- Decommissioned: 1872
- Renamed: Amphitrite, 15 June 1869
- Fate: Scrapped, 1873–1874

General characteristics
- Class & type: Miantonomoh-class monitor
- Displacement: 3,400 long tons (3,455 t)
- Length: 259 ft 6 in (79.1 m) (o/a)
- Beam: 52 ft 10 in (16.1 m)
- Draft: 13 ft 5 in (4.1 m)
- Depth: 14 ft (4.3 m)
- Installed power: 4 Martin water-tube boilers; 1,400 ihp (1,044 kW)
- Propulsion: 2 shafts; 4 HRCR steam engines
- Speed: 9–10 knots (17–19 km/h; 10–12 mph)
- Complement: 150 officers and enlisted men
- Armament: 2 × twin 15 in (381 mm) smoothbore Dahlgren guns
- Armor: Side: 5 in (127 mm); Turrets: 10 in (254 mm); Pilothouse: 8 in (203 mm); Deck: 1.5 in (38 mm)

USS Tonawanda was one of four Miantonomoh-class monitors built for the United States Navy during the American Civil War of 1861–1865. Commissioned in 1865 after the war ended in May, the ship was decommissioned at the end of the year, but was reactivated to serve as a training ship at the United States Naval Academy in 1866. She was renamed Amphitrite in 1869 and was decommissioned again in 1872. The monitor was sold for scrap the following year. The Navy Department evaded the Congressional refusal to order new ships by claiming that the Civil War-era ship was being repaired while building a new monitor of the same name.

== Description ==
The Miantonomoh class was designed by John Lenthall, Chief of the Bureau of Construction and Repair, although the ships varied somewhat in their details. Tonawanda was 259 feet 6 inches (79.1 m) long overall, had a beam of 52 feet 10 inches (16.1 m) and had a draft of 13 feet 5 inches (4.1 m). The ship had a depth of hold of 14 feet (4.3 m), a tonnage of 1,564 tons burthen and displaced 3,400 long tons (3,500 t). Her crew consisted of 150 officers and enlisted men.

Tonawanda was powered by four inclined horizontal-return connecting-rod steam engines designed by the Engineer-in-Chief of the Navy, Benjamin F. Isherwood. Each pair of engines drove a propeller shaft using steam generated by four Martin vertical water-tube boilers. The engines were rated at 1,400 indicated horsepower (1,044 kW) and gave the ship a top speed of 9–10 knots (17–19 km/h; 10–12 mph). She was designed to carry 300 long tons (305 t) of coal.

=== Armament and armor ===
Her main battery consisted of four smoothbore, muzzle-loading, 15-inch (381 mm) Dahlgren guns mounted in two twin-gun turrets, one each fore and aft of the single funnel. Each gun weighed approximately 43,000 pounds (20,000 kg). They could fire a 350-pound (158.8 kg) shell up to a range of 2,100 yards (1,900 m) at an elevation of +7°.

The sides of the hull of the Miantonomoh-class ships were protected by five layers of 1-inch (25 mm) wrought-iron plates that tapered at their bottom edge down to total of 3 inches (76 mm), backed by 12–14 inches (305–356 mm) of wood. The armor of the gun turret consisted of ten layers of one-inch plates and the pilot house had eight layers. The ship's deck was protected by armor 1.5 inches (38 mm) thick. The bases of the funnel and the ventilator were also protected by unknown thicknesses of armor.

== Construction and career ==
Tonawanda, named after Tonawanda Creek, New York, was laid down in 1863 at the Philadelphia Navy Yard, Philadelphia, Pennsylvania, launched on 6 May 1864, and commissioned on 12 October 1865 with Commander William Ronckendorff in command. Completed too late for service in the war, Tonawanda was decommissioned at the Washington Navy Yard on 22 December. She was reactivated on 23 October 1866 to serve as a training ship at the United States Naval Academy in Annapolis, Maryland. The ship was renamed Amphitrite on 15 June 1869 and she was decommissioned in 1872. By this time her wooden hull was rotting and she was sold for scrap in 1873 to Harlan and Hollingsworth Co. of Wilmington, Delaware. Although Congress was informed by the Navy Department that the Civil War-era ship was being repaired, a new iron-hulled monitor of the same name was built with repair money and the proceeds of her sale because Congress refused to fund any new construction at this time.
