= BM-1 =

BM-1 can refer to:

- TOS-1, a Russian multiple-rocket launcher
- USS Puritan (BM-1), a United States monitor
- BM1 (New York City bus), a bus route in New York City
