= Battle of Fajardo =

Battle of the Spanish-American War

Coordinates: 18°19′33″N 65°39′09″W

- Part of the Spanish–American War
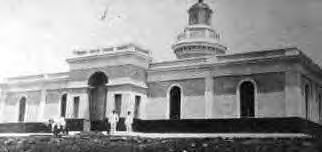
- Faro de Las Cabezas de San Juan (Cape San Juan lighthouse), c. 1898. It is located on the northeastern part of the highest point of Cape San Juan in Fajardo, Puerto Rico.
Date	8–9 August 1898
Location	Fajardo, Puerto Rico
Result	Spanish victory

Belligerents
Spain	United States

Commanders and leaders
Col. Pedro del Pino	Capt. Frederick Rodgers

Strength
200	2 protected cruisers 2 monitors 1 armed tug 1 collier 28 marines 1 machine gun

Casualties and losses
2 killed 3 wounded	1 died of wounds

The Battle of Fajardo was an engagement between the armed forces of the United States and Spain that occurred on the night of August 8–9, 1898 near the end of the Puerto Rican Campaign during the Spanish–American War.

== Background ==
Proceeding under orders from Rear Admiral William T. Sampson, the monitors USS Puritan, USS Amphitrite, the armed tug USS Leyden, and the collier USS Hannibal proceeded from Port Nipe to Cape San Juan, on the northeastern tip of Puerto Rico, arriving late afternoon on August, 1. The ships anchored behind a series of keys: Icacos, Isla de Lobos and Isla Palominos, out of sight from the mainland. Cape San Juan (Fajardo) was the designated landing site for the US Army forces under Major General Nelson A. Miles. However, sometime between July 21–24, 1898, Miles had unilaterally changed the invasion site from Fajardo to Guanica on the southwest coast of Puerto Rico. Expecting a rendez-vous with Miles' troops, but finding no transports save for Arcadia and Mississippi that "had been ordered to make a landing, but were at a loss what to do", the senior officer present, Captain Frederick W. Rodgers, USN, of Puritan ordered Leyden, Ensign Walter S. Crosley, USN, commanding, to stand out for the telegraph office at St. Thomas to communicate with the Navy Department in Washington, D.C. Rodgers ordered two boat parties of bluejackets ashore from Puritan led by Lt. Herman G. Dresel, USN, for reconnaissance. The sailors traveled to within half a mile of the nearby town of Fajardo. Upon spotting Spanish troops, the boat party turned back, seizing a schooner as a Prize of war before returning to Puritan.

The next morning, Captain Rodgers ordered another boat party ashore led by Lt. Commander James R. Selfridge, USN. The sailors seized the "Faro de Las Cabezas de San Juan" (Cape San Juan lighthouse), posted the American flag and ordered the lighthouse keepers to continue working. The Spaniards in Fajardo, about 5 miles away, did not become aware of the Americans until the early hours of August 3, when an employee of the telegraph office in Fajardo phoned the lighthouse and overheard voices speaking English. This information was immediately telegraphed to Governor General Manuel Macías y Casado at La Fortaleza in San Juan, Puerto Rico. Macias ordered the remaining Spanish troops in Fajardo to withdraw and remove the telegraph equipment.

When Dr. Santiago Veve Calzada, an influential Fajardo civic leader, realized that the Spaniards had withdrawn and the city was defenseless against the invading Americans, he entreated the Spanish authorities in San Juan over the next two days to dispatch troops to defend Fajardo. Believing that the Spanish forces would not come to his aid, on August 5, Veve went to the lighthouse to seek American protection of his town from the Spanish.

Obtaining an invitation from Captains Rodgers and Charles J. Barclay of Amphitrite, Dr. Veve and other Fajardan civic leaders rowed out to the American monitor on the morning of August 5, and persuaded the naval captains to protect the women and children of the prominent town families from a feared Spanish reprisal. Leyden had since returned from St. Thomas and Puritan, Hannibal and the two army transports proceeded on to Ponce.

On the afternoon of August 5, Captain Barclay, Ensign Albert Campbell, a few prominent Fajardan leaders, including Veve and a landing party of 14 bluejackets boarded the shallow-draft Leyden and navigated through the shoals to shore. The American bluejackets and the contingent of Fajardans posted the American flag at the Customs House in the harbor and marched to the town where they hoisted the United States flag over the City Hall. Before the sailors returned to their ship, Barclay organized a citizens militia to patrol the town and appointed Dr. Veve as military governor of the eastern region of Puerto Rico.

Captain Ángel Rivero Méndez was ordered to investigate the situation in Fajardo. He was told that the Americans no longer occupied the city and that it would be an easy task to capture the people of Fajardo that had betrayed Spain. Rivero Méndez passed the information to General Ricardo de Ortega y Diez who suggested to Governor Macias that they take the town with 200 soldiers and an artillery battery. Macias was told to capture Dr. Santiago Veve Calzada and all those involved in the revolt, including the Americans in the lighthouse even if it meant the destruction of the structure.

On August 5, Governor General Macias dispatched Colonel Pedro del Pino and 200 men, including provisional troops and civil guardsmen from San Juan to recapture Fajardo. When the citizenry learned that the Spanish troops were coming, panic and fear ensued among those who had sided with the Americans. The citizen militia was disbanded and the citizens who had joined in the sedition fled to neighboring towns and into the hills. Dr. Veve and several other town leaders went to Amphitrite. Moving by rail from Hato Rey to Carolina and then marching the rest of the way, the Spanish troops entered Fajardo the afternoon of August 7.

== Battle ==
Early on the evening of August 6, with USS Amphitrite anchored about 1,800 yards offshore, Captain Barclay ordered a landing party of 14 petty officers and men from Amphitrite, armed with rifles, pistols and a 6mm Colt machine gun under Ensign Kenneth M. Bennett, with Assistant Engineer David J. Jenkins, Naval Cadets William H. Boardman, Paul Foley and Pay Clerk O.F. Cato to reoccupy the Cape San Juan lighthouse. Almost immediately, a second boat of 14 armed petty officers and men under naval Lt. Charles N. Atwater with Assistant Surgeon A.H. Heppner was dispatched, with Atwater to take command of the landing parties. Atwater ordered Bennett's men to proceed ahead to reoccupy the lighthouse and light the lamp, while his boat squad first secured both boats before following them up to the lighthouse. Though no attack materialised the first night, Cadet Boardman was mortally wounded when his revolver dislodged from its faulty holster, fell to the marble floor and fired into his left inner thigh as he was entering the darkened lighthouse with three sailors. Assistant Surgeon Heppner initially believed it was a flesh-wound, although Boardman suffered a large loss of blood. He died two days later on the Amphitrite where he was evacuated that night after the ship's surgeon came ashore to accompany him and Dr. Heppner back to the ship. Boardman was one of only 23 combat-related U.S. Navy deaths during the entire Spanish–American War, two Navy deaths during Puerto Rican operations and the only Annapolis cadet to die out of 123 who served on ships in combat operations.

Meanwhile, in Fajardo, when Spanish Col. Pino first led his troops into the city they found it mostly deserted; about 60 of the women and children of the cities prominent families, including Dr. Veve's wife and children and a few Europeans that were deemed most at risk, had been authorized by Captain Barclay to be quartered in the lighthouse with the American petty officers and men, while some 700 Fajardans that could not be accommodated were camped out in the adjacent hills.

On the 7th, Jenkins and Foley returned to Amphitrite and on the 8th, Jenkins returned to the lighthouse with Gunner Herbert Campbell and a relief party for half the men, who returned to the ship, including Ensign Bennett and Pay Clerk Cato. The cruiser Cincinnati, and collier Hannibal joined Amphitrite and Leyden off Cape San Juan on August 8. That day, the Amphitrite landing party engaged in arms practice and fortified the lighthouse for the expected assault by Spanish troops. Windows were blocked, sentries placed, and the Colt machine gun was mounted on the roof to "sweep the lane".

On the 7th and 8 August, native horse-men repeatedly galloped up to the Navy men "with the wildest of rumors" estimating the Spanish were planning attacks with 500 men, a figure hyperbolically increased to 800.

Just before 11:00 on the night of August 8, 1898, Lt. Atwater thought he saw moving figures in white, on the edge of the woods 250 yards from the lighthouse. At 11:45, with moonlight breaking through the clouds, he saw several men in the brush on the edge of the woods. Without giving an alarm, he instructed the lookouts to be on heightened vigilance. As he was heading to the yard gate to order the corporal of the guard and sentry to come inside the light-house, those men came running up and announced they had seen Spanish troops in the road. Almost immediately, a volley of gunfire erupted from the surrounding woods.

Atwater ordered the lighthouse lamp doused as a signal to the three armed ships lying offshore that the light-house was under attack. The cruiser, Cincinnati, the only ship with an operable searchlight, trained it on the hill where the lighthouse sat in order to direct secondary battery gunfire from Cincinnati, Amphitrite and Leyden on the attacking Spanish troops.

At about 12:30am, an errant 6 pound naval shell crashed through the 2 foot thick walls of the parapet, "within touch of six men not one was hurt" when the shell failed to explode. Lt. Atwater immediately ordered the lighthouse lamp relit. At about the same time, gunfire from the Spanish troops ceased and Atwater gave the order to cease firing shortly thereafter. 1,100 shots were fired from the 22 rifles of the navy men in the lighthouse. Lt. Atwater estimated the Spanish force was probably 72 infantry, 24 cavalry, with 2 killed and three wounded, one of them a Spanish lieutenant. The Americans retained control of the lighthouse and suffered no casualties.

== Aftermath ==
Early the next morning, Captain Barclay decided to withdraw the landing party and civilian refugees as the advantage of continuing to hold the lighthouse seemed slight. The U.S. Marine guard from Cincinnati under the command of 1st Lt. John A. Lejeune and a like number of men from Amphitrite (30) landed and covered the withdrawal. The women and children refugees were soon on board the USS Leyden which transported them to Ponce, Puerto Rico.

After the Americans had departed, Col. Pino's men tore down the two U.S. flags that flew over the Customs House and City Hall and returned to San Juan after verifying that the lighthouse was abandoned, leaving only the civil guard behind to police Fajardo. The flags, as trophies of war, were sent to Madrid, Spain where today they can be seen at the army museum there.

While the Battle of Fajardo was the only instance in the Puerto Rican Campaign where American forces withdrew from a position, it was not a defeat. President McKinley mentioned the engagement in his State of the Union address, remarking, "With the exception of encounters with the enemy at Guayama, Hormigueros, Coamo, and Yauco and an attack on a force landed at Cape San Juan, there was no serious resistance. The campaign was prosecuted with great vigor, and by the 12th of August much of the island was in our possession and the acquisition of the remainder was only a matter of a short time."

== See also ==
- Puerto Rican Campaign
- Spanish–American War
- Satellite View of Fajardo lighthouse and offshore keys (Reserva Natural de las Cabezas de San Juan)
- Photo of Fajardo Customs House
- Photo of Fajardo City Hall
