= Terror =

Terror(s) or The Terror may refer to:

== Emotions ==
- An extreme form of fear, the emotional response to a threat or danger
  - Angst, a form of anxiety or fear described in existentialist philosophy
  - Anxiety, a sense of dread
  - Panic, a sudden overwhelming fear
  - Horror and terror, comparison between the two emotions, used especially in Gothic literature

== Politics ==
- Terror (politics), a policy of political repression and violence
  - Terrorism, the use of violence against non-combatants to achieve political or ideological aims
- Reign of Terror, commonly known as The Terror, a period of violence (1793–1794) after the onset of the French Revolution
- The Terror (Karlovo massacre), a massacre of Bulgarian civilians in Karlovo, followed by police and legal repression in the second half of 1878
- The Great Purge in the 1930s Soviet Union is also known as the "Great Terror" or "The Terror"

== Arts, entertainment and media ==
=== Fictional entities ===
- Terror (Marvel Comics), a Marvel Comics character
- Terror (New England Comics), a supervillain
- Terror, a land/sea/airship in Jules Verne's novel Master of the World

=== Film ===
- The Terror (1917 film), an American silent film
- The Terror (1920 film), an American western film starring Tom Mix
- Terror (1924 film), a French film starring Pearl White
- The Terror (1926 film), an American western film
- The Terror (1928 film), an American horror film directed by Roy Del Ruth
- The Terror (1938 film), a British crime film
- The Terror (1963 film), an American horror film directed by Roger Corman
- Terror (1977 film), a Danish horror film
- Terror (1978 film), a British horror film
- (T)ERROR (2015), an American documentary
- Terror (2016 film), an Indian film

=== Music ===
- Terror (band), a band from California
- Terror (demo), a 1994 demo tape by thrash metal band Evildead
- Terrors (EP), a 2001 D'espairsRay EP
- Terror (album), a 2004 album by Loudness
- The Terror (album), a 2013 album by The Flaming Lips
- "Terror", a song by Susumu Hirasawa from Detonator Orgun 2
- "Terror", a song by Mac DeMarco from his 2025 album Guitar
- "Terror", a song by My Ruin from Speak and Destroy
- "T-Error", a song by Die Ärzte from Geräusch
- "Terrifying" (song), a song by the Rolling Stones from their 1989 album Steel Wheels
- Terror, a rapper featured on the album My World, My Way

=== Television ===
- Terror (TV series), a Viceland documentary series
- "Terror" (Bottom), an episode of the British sitcom Bottom
- "Terrors", a 2011 episode of Young Justice
- The Terror (TV series), a 2018 AMC-TV series based on Dan Simmons' 2007 novel
- The Terror: Infamy, season 2 of the AMC-TV series The Terror

=== Other uses in arts, entertainment, and media ===
- Terror Illustrated, a 1950s magazine
- Terror Inc., a 1990s comic book series
- The Terror (novel), a 2007 novel by Dan Simmons
- The Terror (play), by the British writer Edgar Wallace

== Places ==
- Mount Terror (Antarctica)
- Mount Terror (Washington), United States

== Vessels ==
- HMS Terror, several ships of the Royal Navy
- Spanish destroyer Terror, a Spanish Navy destroyer in commission from 1896 to 1922 that fought in the Spanish–American War
- USS Terror, several ships of the United States Navy
- Terror (boat), a British sailboat used to transport oysters to shore from larger vessels, built c. 1890

== Sports ==
- Houston Thunderbears, an Arena Football League team originally called the Texas Terror
- Tampa Bay Terror, a defunct indoor soccer team based in Tampa Bay, Florida, U.S.

== See also ==
- Red Terror (disambiguation)
- White Terror (disambiguation)
- Terroir, the influence of local growing conditions on the taste of wine or other food or drink
