= William Dunn (Medal of Honor) =

- Born: April 28, 1834; Lisbon, Maine, US
- Died: March 18, 1902 (aged 67); West Bowdoin, Maine, US
- Military career
- Allegiance: United States of America; Union
- Branch: United States Navy; Union Navy
- Rank: Quartermaster
- Unit: USS Monadnock (1863)
- Conflicts: American Civil War • Second Battle of Fort Fisher
- Awards: Medal of Honor

William Dunn (April 28, 1834 – March 18, 1902) was a sailor in the U.S. Navy during the American Civil War. He received the Medal of Honor for his actions during the Second Battle of Fort Fisher on January 15, 1865.

== Military service ==
Dunn volunteered for service in the U.S. Navy and was assigned to the Union monitor USS Monadnock (1863). His enlistment is credited to the state of Maine.

On January 15, 1865, the North Carolina Confederate stronghold of Fort Fisher was taken by a combined Union storming party of sailors, marines, and soldiers under the command of Admiral David Dixon Porter and General Alfred Terry.

== Medal of Honor citation ==
The President of the United States of America, in the name of Congress, takes pleasure in presenting the Medal of Honor to Quartermaster William Dunn, United States Navy, for extraordinary heroism in action while serving on board the U.S.S. Monadnock in action during several attacks on Fort Fisher, North Carolina, 24 and 25 December 1864; and 13, 14, and 15 January 1865. With his ship anchored well inshore to insure perfect range against the severe fire of rebel guns, Quartermaster Dunn continued his duties when the vessel was at anchor, as her propellers were kept in motion to make her turrets bear, and the shooting away of her chain might have caused her to ground. Disdainful of shelter despite severe weather conditions, he inspired his shipmates and contributed to the success of his vessel in reducing the enemy guns to silence.

General Orders: War Department, General Orders No. 59 (June 22, 1865)

Action Date: January 15, 1865

Service: Navy

Rank: Quartermaster

Division: U.S.S. Monadnock

== See also ==
- List of Medal of Honor recipients
- List of American Civil War Medal of Honor recipients: A–F
