= USS Hannibal =

Collier of the United States Navy

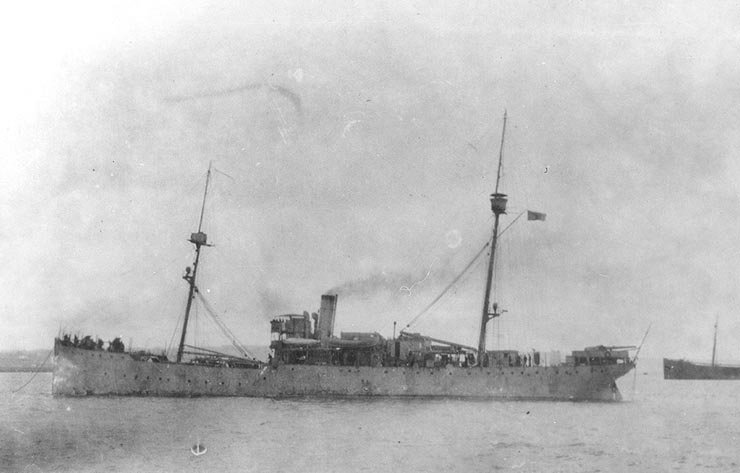
- Brest, France, circa. 1918–1919

History

United States
- Name: Joseph Holland (1898); Hannibal (1898—1945)
- Namesake: Hannibal
- Builder: J. Blumer & Company, Sunderland, England
- Launched: 9 March 1898
- Completed: April 1898
- Acquired: 16 April 1898
- Commissioned: 7 June 1898
- Decommissioned: 20 August 1944
- Reclassified: "AG-1" (July 1920)
- Honors and awards: Spanish Campaign badge
- Fate: Sunk as target 1 March 1945

General characteristics
- Type: Collier; Hydrographic survey vessel
- Tonnage: 1918: 1,109 NRT; 1938: 5,056 GRT 2,957 NRT
- Displacement: 1918: 4,000 long tons (4,100 t); 1938: 3,550 long tons (3,610 t)
- Length: 274 ft 1 in (83.54 m) overall; 263 ft 4 in (80.26 m) between perpendiculars
- Beam: 39 ft 3 in (11.96 m) load water line
- Draft: 1918: 17 ft 7 in (5.36 m) mean; 1938: 15 ft 6 in (4.72 m) full load
- Depth: 20 ft (6.1 m)
- Installed power: 2 single end boilers (propulsion & auxiliary power); 2 x 10 kW; 1 x 5 kW electric generating sets 1,100 ihp
- Propulsion: Steam, vertical triple expansion
- Speed: 9 kn (10 mph; 17 km/h)
- Complement: 306
- Armament: As collier: 1 × 4 in (100 mm) gun, 2 × 3 in (76 mm) guns, 8 × .50 cal (12.7 mm) machine guns; 1918: none; 1938: 1 4-inch/50-caliber gun, 2 X 3-inch/50-caliber gun

USS Hannibal (AG-1) was launched 9 March 1898 as the 1,785 GRT steamer Joseph Holland of London. The ship was laid down at as North Dock yard hull 143 for F. S. Holland, London, by J. Blumer & Company at Sunderland, England. Completion was in April 1898. (Note: The newly sold Hannibal is in the same register under Steamers "H".)

On 16 April 1898 the ship was purchased by the United States Navy and renamed Hannibal. She was one of the very few ships to serve in the U.S. Navy in the Spanish–American War, World War I and World War II. She was commissioned on 7 June 1898.

During the Spanish–American War, Hannibal participated in the Puerto Rico Campaign. On one occasion she and three other US ships bombarded the Spanish positions at the Battle of Fajardo. The ship was awarded The Spanish Campaign Medal and her officers and men were issued the Spanish Campaign badge for 1898 service.

From June 1898 – May 1908, Hannibal served in the Collier Service along the Atlantic coast. After an overhaul in 1908, she continued in the Collier Service with her base in New England for nearly three years. Hannibal was decommissioned on 15 August 1911.

She was recommissioned on 16 October 1911 and was assigned to the U.S. Survey Squadron to make depth soundings and surveys in preparation for the opening of the Panama Canal. Hydrographic surveys continued in the Caribbean until 1917, including operations in Panama, Nicaragua, Honduras, and Cuba.

With the advent of World War I, Hannibal operated with the Patrol Force of the Atlantic Fleet. After an overhaul in early 1918, she became a tender to submarine chasers at Plymouth, England. Hannibal served in English waters until December, when she sailed for the Azores via Gibraltar as a sub-chaser escort. In early 1919, she resumed sub-tender duties, and visited England, France, and Portugal returning to the United States in August escorting subchasers. The ship served in the Caribbean before lay up in mid-1919.

Hannibal remained in reserve during which she was classified as a "miscellaneous auxiliary" in July 1920 with the hull number AG-1 at Philadelphia until 9 February 1921, when she sailed for Cuba to resume survey operations which lasted until 1930. During the next decade Hannibal surveyed waters near Trinidad, Venezuela, Costa Rica, and the Panama Canal Zone.

In 1933, Hannibal and Gannet were the first U.S. Navy vessels to collect dynamic sounding data in which depth and oceanographic data were collected in one sounding and analyzed aboard. After serving the U.S. Navy for 42 years, 28 of which had been dedicated to supporting the U.S. Navy Hydrographic Office, Hannibal was replaced by Bowditch in 1940.

During World War II, she operated out of Norfolk, Virginia in the Chesapeake Bay degaussing range. Hannibal was decommissioned on 20 August 1944 and was sunk as a bombing target on 1 March 1945, in the Chesapeake Bay, just to the northwest of Smith Island, Maryland.

A target hulk placed at the general location of Hannibal's sinking was referred to as Hannibal. That target lasted 21 years before it was largely obliterated. In 1966, the Navy brought in a second target ship, the American Mariner, a disused World War II Liberty ship, and sunk it next to the previous target. Although the American Mariner is currently the U.S. Navy's only active live-fire target ship in the Chesapeake Bay, by tradition it keeps the name of the original target ship on that site and is still referred to as the Hannibal.

== Awards ==
- Spanish Campaign Medal
- Victory Medal
- American Defense Service Medal
- American Campaign Medal
- World War II Victory Medal
