= USS Monadnock (1863) =

Miantonomoh-class monitor

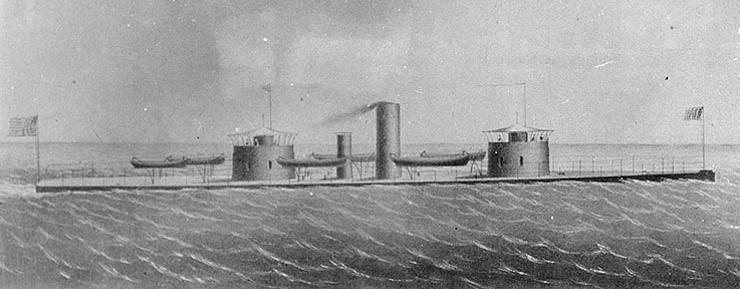
- A lithograph of USS Monadnock

History

United States
- Name: Monadnock
- Namesake: Mount Monadnock
- Builder: Boston Navy Yard, Charlestown, Massachusetts
- Laid down: 1862
- Launched: 23 March 1863
- Commissioned: 4 October 1864
- Decommissioned: 30 June 1866
- Fate: Scrapped, 1874

General characteristics
- Class & type: Miantonomoh-class monitor
- Displacement: 3,295 long tons (3,348 t)
- Length: 259 ft 6 in (79.1 m) (o/a)
- Beam: 52 ft 6 in (16 m)
- Draft: 12 ft 3 in (3.7 m)
- Depth: 15 ft 6 in (4.7 m)
- Installed power: 4 Martin water-tube boilers; 1,400 ihp (1,044 kW)
- Propulsion: 2 shafts; 2 vibrating-lever steam engines
- Speed: 9 knots (17 km/h; 10 mph)
- Complement: 150 officers and enlisted men
- Armament: 2 × twin 15 in (381 mm) smoothbore Dahlgren guns
- Armor: Side: 5 in (127 mm); Turrets: 10 in (254 mm); Deck: 1.5 in (38 mm); Pilothouse: 8 in (203 mm)

USS Monadnock was one of four Miantonomoh-class monitors built for the United States Navy during the American Civil War. Commissioned in late 1864, she participated in the First and Second Battles of Fort Fisher in December 1864 and January 1865, respectively. The ship was later assigned to the James River Flotilla on the approaches to the Confederate capital of Richmond, Virginia, and then sailed to Spanish Cuba to intercept the Confederate ironclad CSS Stonewall.

Monadnock was then docked for a few months to prepare her for her transfer to California around the tip of South America. The monitor and her escorts departed in late 1865 and reached the Chilean port of Valparaíso in early 1866, where the Americans unsuccessfully attempted to prevent the Spanish from bombarding the undefended town during the Chincha Islands War. The ships reached California in June, and Monadnock was decommissioned at the end of the month. The monitor was sold for scrap in 1874. The Navy Department evaded the Congressional refusal to order new ships by claiming that the Civil War-era ship was being repaired while building a new monitor of the same name.

== Description and construction ==
The Miantonomoh class were designed by John Lenthall, Chief of the Bureau of Construction and Repair, although the ships varied somewhat in their details. Monadnock was 259 feet 6 inches (79.1 m) long overall, had a beam of 52 feet 6 inches (16 m) and had a draft of 12 feet 3 inches (3.7 m). The ship had a depth of hold of 15 feet 6 inches (4.7 m), a tonnage of 1,564 tons burthen and displaced 3,295 long tons (3,348 t). Her crew consisted of 150 officers and enlisted men.

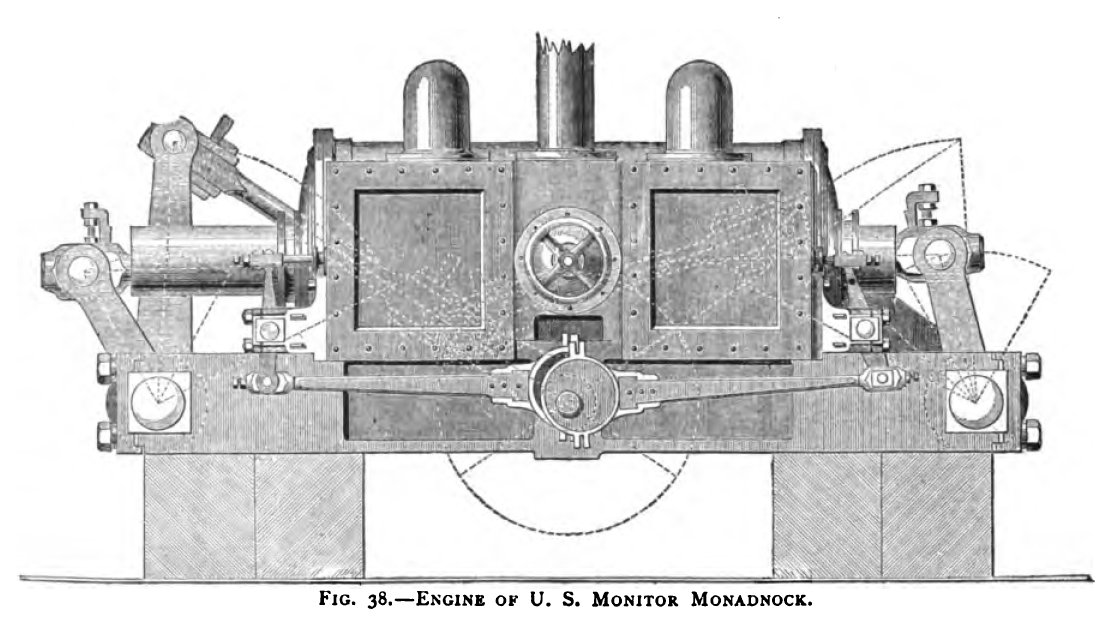
Illustration of Monadnock's vibrating-lever engine – front view

Monadnock was powered by a pair of two-cylinder horizontal vibrating-lever steam engines, each driving one four-bladed propeller about 10 feet (3 m) in diameter using steam generated by four Martin vertical water-tube boilers. The engines were rated at 1,400 indicated horsepower (1,000 kW) and gave the ship a top speed of 9 knots (17 km/h; 10 mph). She was designed to carry 300 long tons (305 t) of coal.

=== Armament and armor ===
Her main battery consisted of four smoothbore, muzzle-loading, 15-inch (381 mm) Dahlgren guns mounted in two twin-gun turrets, one each fore and aft of the single funnel. Each gun weighed approximately 43,000 pounds (20,000 kg). They could fire a 350-pound (158.8 kg) shell up to a range of 2,100 yards (1,900 m) at an elevation of +7°.

The sides of the hull of the Miantonomoh-class ships were protected by five layers of 1-inch (25 mm) wrought-iron plates that tapered at their bottom edge down to total of 3 inches (76 mm), backed by 12–14 inches (305–356 mm) of wood. The armor of the gun turret consisted of ten layers of one-inch plates and the pilot house had eight layers. The ship's deck was protected by armor 1.5 inches (38 mm) thick. The bases of the funnel and the ventilator were also protected by unknown thicknesses of armor.

== Construction and career ==
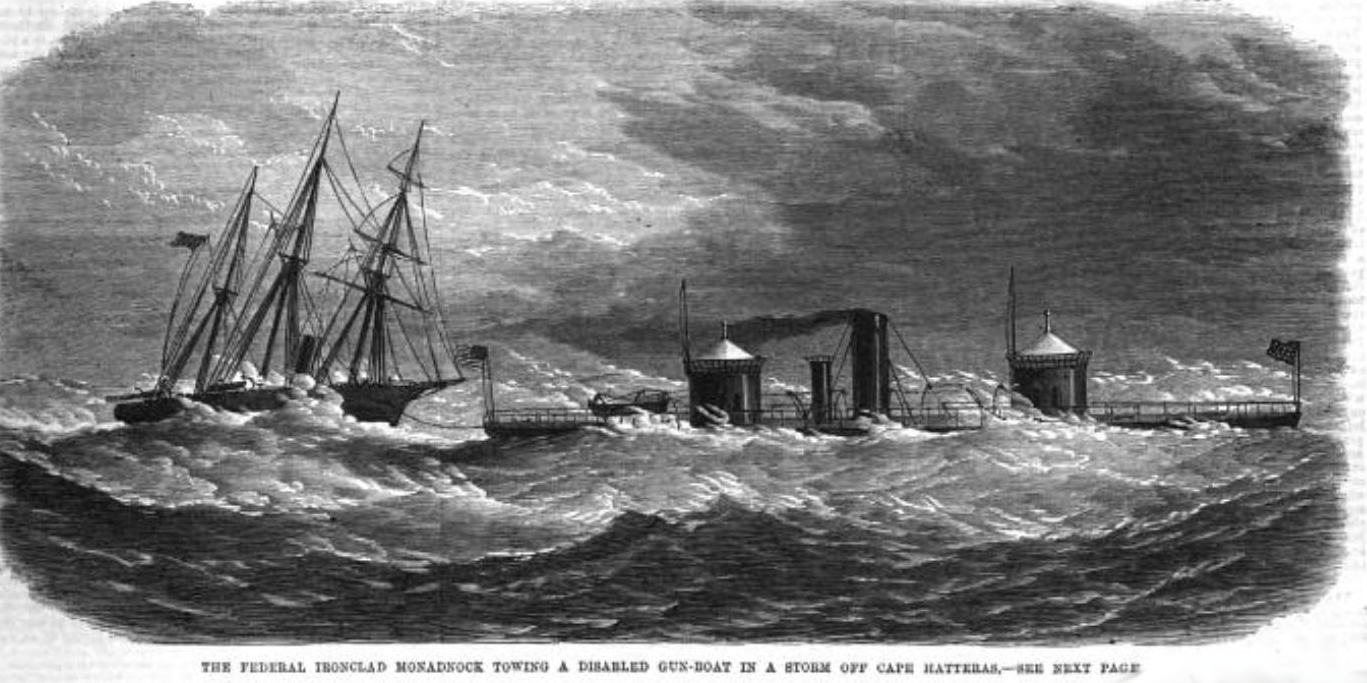
USS Monadnock towing a disabled gun boat off Cape Hatteras (1865)

Monadnock, named after Mount Monadnock, a mountain in southern New Hampshire, was laid down at the Boston Navy Yard in Charlestown, Massachusetts in 1862. The ship was launched on 23 March 1863 and commissioned on 4 October 1864. She subsequently steamed to Norfolk, Virginia, and there Commander Enoch Parrott assumed command on 20 November. On 13 December she departed Norfolk for the assault against Fort Fisher and joined the North Atlantic Blockading Squadron two days later. The reinforced squadron approached Fort Fisher on 24 December as part of the Union fleet. At ranges of 1,100–1,200 yards (1,000–1,100 m) she bombarded the fortification and continued throughout the day. The following morning she resumed shelling the fort as 2,000 Army troops under the command of General Benjamin F. Butler landed 3 miles (4.8 km) north of the fort. The soldiers were withdrawn later that day when Butler received word of approaching Confederate troops and worsening weather that would prevent him from evacuating his troops. Although the Navy had believed that its fire was accurate and effective, it was neither because many gunners had aimed at the Confederate flag flying above the fort and their shells had flown across the peninsula to land in the Cape Fear River.

A second assault was begun on the morning of 13 January 1865 with the ironclads the first to fire in the hopes of provoking the Confederate gunners to retaliate and reveal the positions of their gun so that they could be engaged by the rest of the fleet. The ironclads had anchored to make their fire more accurate and Monadnock kept up a slow and deliberate fire during the day and into the night. Resupplying ammunition at night the ship kept up her fire through the 15th. After Rear Admiral David D. Porter ordered that his ships were to aim at the walls of Fort Fisher rather than the flag, the bombardment was much more effective and many guns were dismounted or disabled. Monadnock's side armor was struck five times during the battle with little damage inflicted; the turrets and the ventilation pipe were also hit five times with no damage recorded. One of the monitor's sailors, Quartermaster William Dunn, was awarded the Medal of Honor for his actions in the Fort Fisher engagements.

Monadnock was ordered to Charleston, South Carolina, on 18 January to reinforce the South Atlantic Blockading Squadron there under the command of Rear Admiral John A. Dahlgren. After the Confederates abandoned Charleston and its surrender on 18 February, Monadnock's crew took possession of the blockade runner SS Deer the following day and the monitor entered Charleston Harbor on the 20th. After a stay at Port Royal, South Carolina, she steamed to Hampton Roads, Virginia, on 15 March and then up the James River where she was assigned to the James River Flotilla. By 18 March, Commander William Ronckendorff had relieved Parrott in command of the ship. On 2 April, she steamed to support the final assault on Richmond and then assisted in clearing the river of naval mines. Returning to Hampton Roads on 7 April, Monadnock was assigned to the squadron commanded by Acting Rear Admiral Sylvanus Godon, which had been established to search for the Stonewall. The French-built ship had been ordered by the Confederacy, embargoed and sold to Denmark in 1864 and resold to the Confederacy in January 1865. Delayed by rudder problems, she was en route to the United States and ultimately made landfall in Spanish Cuba on 15 May. The squadron departed two days later and put into Charleston Harbor on the 22nd to re-coal and to be reinforced by the monitor Canonicus before continuing on to Havana, Cuba. They arrived on 28 May to find that the Stonewall had been temporarily turned over to the Spanish government. Monadnock's presence no longer required, she arrived at Norfolk, Virginia, on 12 June and continued onwards to the League Island Navy Yard in Philadelphia, Pennsylvania, to prepare for her impending voyage to California.

=== Voyage around South America ===
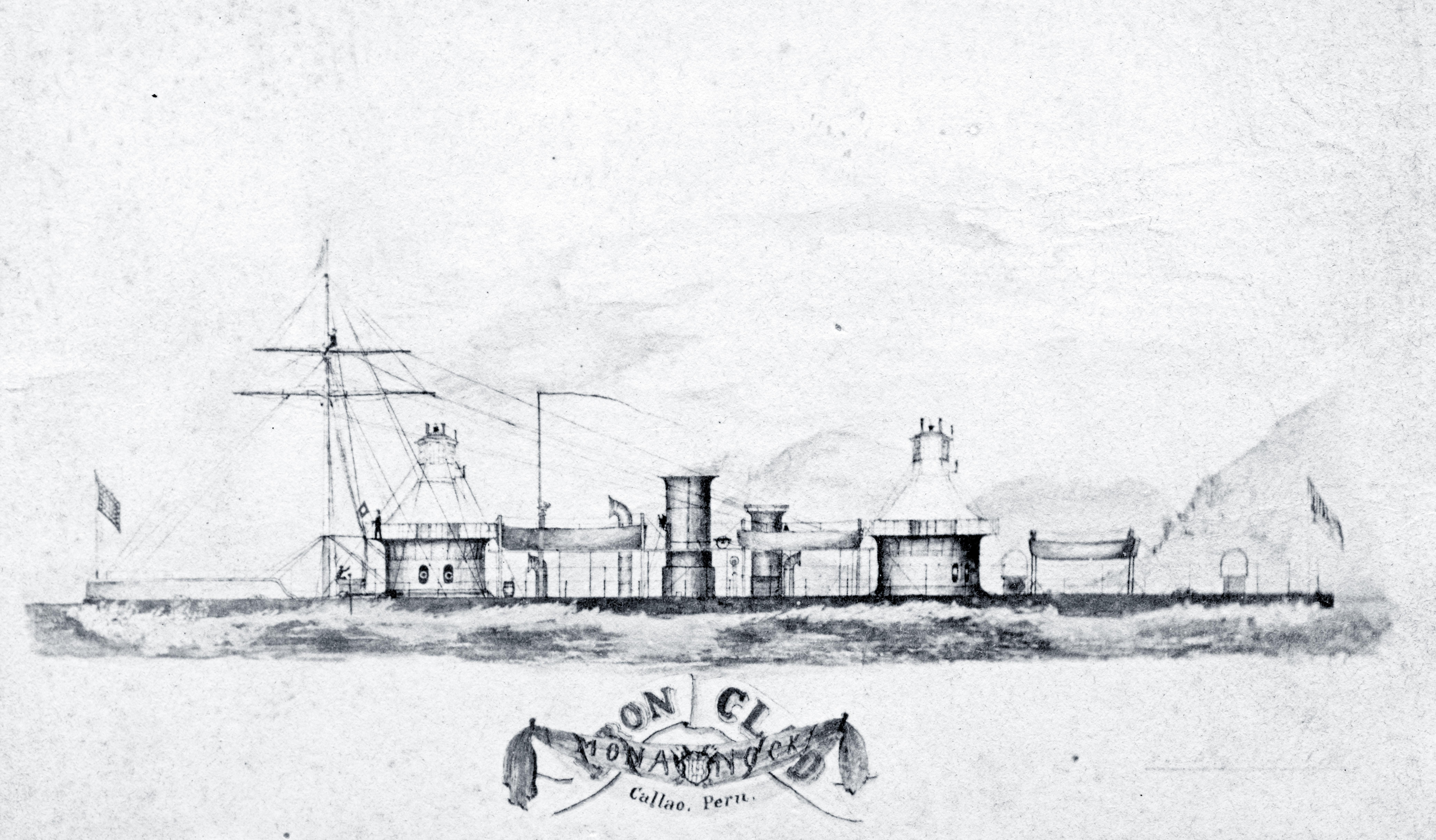
Monadnock as she appeared in Callao, Peru, showing all the modifications made for the voyage

To prepare the monitor for the voyage, she was fitted with a 3-foot-6-inch (1.07 m) breakwater to prevent head seas from battering her forward turret and tall, wooden pilot houses above the existing ones. During the trip a jury-rigged foremast was added which reportedly added 0.5 knots (0.93 km/h; 0.58 mph) to her speed.

Monadnock departed on 5 October in company with the paddle frigates USS Vanderbilt and USS Powhatan and the sloop USS Tuscarora. The monitor steamed the entire way to California entirely under her own speed and the biggest problem reported was that temperatures in the fire room ranged from 120 to 140 °F (49 to 60 °C). Stokers collapsed daily from heat prostration and special inducements of extra pay and spirits had to be offered for men to take their place. After stops at numerous South American ports, the squadron transited the Strait of Magellan and arrived at Valparaíso in late March 1866 as a Spanish squadron was preparing to bombard the undefended town, contrary to international law, during the Chincha Islands War. Commodore John Rogers, commander of the American squadron, attempted to persuade Admiral Casto Méndez Núñez to forego the bombardment, but the latter claimed it was a point of Spanish honor. Rogers even had his ships clear for action in an unsuccessful attempt to intimidate Méndez Núñez and was prepared to open fire if he received support from the small British squadron in the harbor. That was not forthcoming as the British minister in the town forbade Rear-Admiral Joseph Denham to act and Rogers was forced to stand down.

Monadnock's arrival at Acapulco coincided with a Mexican siege of the town's French defenders during the Second French intervention in Mexico. The squadron continued on to San Francisco, anchoring off that city on 21 June. On 26 June she proceeded to Vallejo, and entered the Mare Island Navy Yard where she was decommissioned on 30 June. Eight years later, her wooden hull was rotting and she was sold for scrap. Although Congress was informed by the Navy Department that the Civil War-era ship was being repaired, a new iron-hulled monitor of the same name was built with repair money and the proceeds of her sale because Congress refused to fund any new construction at that time.

== Bibliography ==
- Alden, John D. (1974). "Monitors 'Round Cape Horn". United States Naval Institute Proceedings. 100 (September): 78–82. ISSN 0041-798X.
- Canney, Donald L. (1993). The Old Steam Navy. Vol. 2: The Ironclads, 1842–1885. Annapolis, Maryland: Naval Institute Press. ISBN 0-87021-586-8.
- Chesneau, Roger & Kolesnik, Eugene M., eds. (1979). Conway's All the World's Fighting Ships 1860–1905. Greenwich, UK: Conway Maritime Press. ISBN 0-8317-0302-4.
- Foote, Shelby (1974). The Civil War: A Narrative. Vol. 3: Red River to Appomattox. New York: Random House. ISBN 0-394-74913-8.
- Jones, Colin (2011). "Battle at Valparaíso". In Jordan, John (ed.). Warship 2011. London: Conway. pp. 94–101. ISBN 978-1-84486-133-0.
- "Monadnock I (ScStr)". Dictionary of American Naval Fighting Ships. Naval History and Heritage Command. 11 August 2015.
- Olmstead, Edwin; Stark, Wayne E. & Tucker, Spencer C. (1997). The Big Guns: Civil War Siege, Seacoast, and Naval Cannon. Alexandria Bay, New York: Museum Restoration Service. ISBN 0-88855-012-X.
- Silverstone, Paul H. (2006). Civil War Navies 1855–1883. The U.S. Navy Warship Series. New York: Routledge. ISBN 0-415-97870-X.
- "Stonewall". Dictionary of American Naval Fighting Ships. Naval History and Heritage Command.
- United States, Naval War Records Office (1987) [1896]. Official Records of the Union and Confederate Navies in the War of the Rebellion. Series I. Vol. 3: The Operation of the Cruisers (April 1, 1864 – December 30, 1865). Harrisburg, Pennsylvania: National Historical Society. ISBN 978-0-918678-30-0. OCLC 700721383.
- United States, Naval War Records Office (1987) [1900]. Official Records of the Union and Confederate Navies in the War of the Rebellion. Series I. Vol. 11: North Atlantic Blockading Squadron (October 28, 1864 – February 1, 1865). Harrisburg, Pennsylvania: National Historical Society. ISBN 978-0-918678-30-0. OCLC 700721383.
- United States, Naval War Records Office (1987) [1901]. Official Records of the Union and Confederate Navies in the War of the Rebellion. Series I. Vol. 12: North Atlantic Blockading Squadron (February 2, 1865 – August 3, 1865), South Atlantic Blockading Squadron (October 29, 1861 – May 13, 1862). Harrisburg, Pennsylvania: National Historical Society. ISBN 978-0-918678-30-0. OCLC 700721383.
