= William Ronckendorff =

United States Navy officer (1812–1891)

- Born: November 9, 1812; Philadelphia, Pennsylvania, U.S.
- Died: November 27, 1891 (aged 79); New York, New York, U.S.
- Burial place: Laurel Hill Cemetery, Philadelphia, Pennsylvania, U.S.
- Military career
- Allegiance: United States (Union)
- Branch: United States Navy
- Service years: 1838–1874
- Rank: commodore
- Units: Pacific Squadron; Gulf Squadron; West Indian Squadron; North Atlantic Squadron
- Commands: USS M.W. Chapin; USS Water Witch; USS San Jacinto; USS Ticonderoga; USS Powhattan; USS Monadnock; USS Tonawanda; USS Canandaigua
- Conflicts: Mexican-American War; Battle of Monterey; Paraguay expedition; American Civil War; Battle of Hampton Roads; Battle of Sewell's Point

William Ronckendorff (November 9, 1812 – November 27, 1891) was an officer in the United States Navy who served in the Pacific Squadron during the Mexican-American War, the Paraguay expedition of 1859, and the Gulf Squadron and West Indian Squadron during the American Civil War. He served in the North Atlantic Squadron from 1872 to 1873 and was promoted to commodore in 1874.

== Career ==
He entered the Navy, became passed midshipman on 23 June 1838, was commissioned lieutenant on 28 June 1843, and in June 1845 was bearer of despatches to the commander-in-chief of the Pacific Squadron, with which he served during the Mexican–American War. He was in the Savannah at the capture and occupation of Battle of Monterey and points on the coast of California, and returned to New York in September 1847.

He commanded the steamer M. W. Chapin in the Paraguay expedition of 1859 and on coast survey duty in 1860, was commissioned commander, 29 June 1861, and had charge of the steamer Water Witch from 1 March until 12 October 1861, in the Gulf Squadron. On 27 December 1861, he took command of the steamer San Jacinto, with which he was present in the Battle of Hampton Roads to fight the Merrimac, and participated in the barrage prior to the Battle of Sewell's Point, 15 May 1862, and in the capture of Norfolk on 18 May.

While commanding the San Jacinto, Rockendorff chased the CSS Alabama through he Caribbean. He found the ship in French territorial water, but refused to attack and violate international law. The Alabama was able to escape the San Jacinto in the night.

He served as flag captain of the Ticonderoga, and Powhattan as part of the West Indian Squadron searching for privateers in 1863, and in February 1864 he commanded the monitor Monadnock in operations in James River until the evacuation of Richmond, when he cruised to Havana in search of the Stonewall.

In July 1865, he was transferred to the monitor Tonawanda. He was commissioned captain, 27 September 1866, and was at Philadelphia until 1 October 1870, when he took charge of the ironclads at New Orleans until 8 April 1872. He commanded the steamer Canandaigua, of the North Atlantic Squadron, in 1872–73, was promoted to commodore on 12 September 1874, and was placed on the retired list on 9 November 1874, by reason of his age.

He was known as a proponent of temperance and opposed the grog ration given to sailors.

He died on November 27, 1891, in New York, and was interred at Laurel Hill Cemetery in Philadelphia.

== Personal life ==
He married Elizabeth Dale Pettit, granddaughter of Commodore Richard Dale, in 1856 and together they had two children who survived to adult age.
