= USS Puritan (BM-1) =

Monitor of the United States Navy

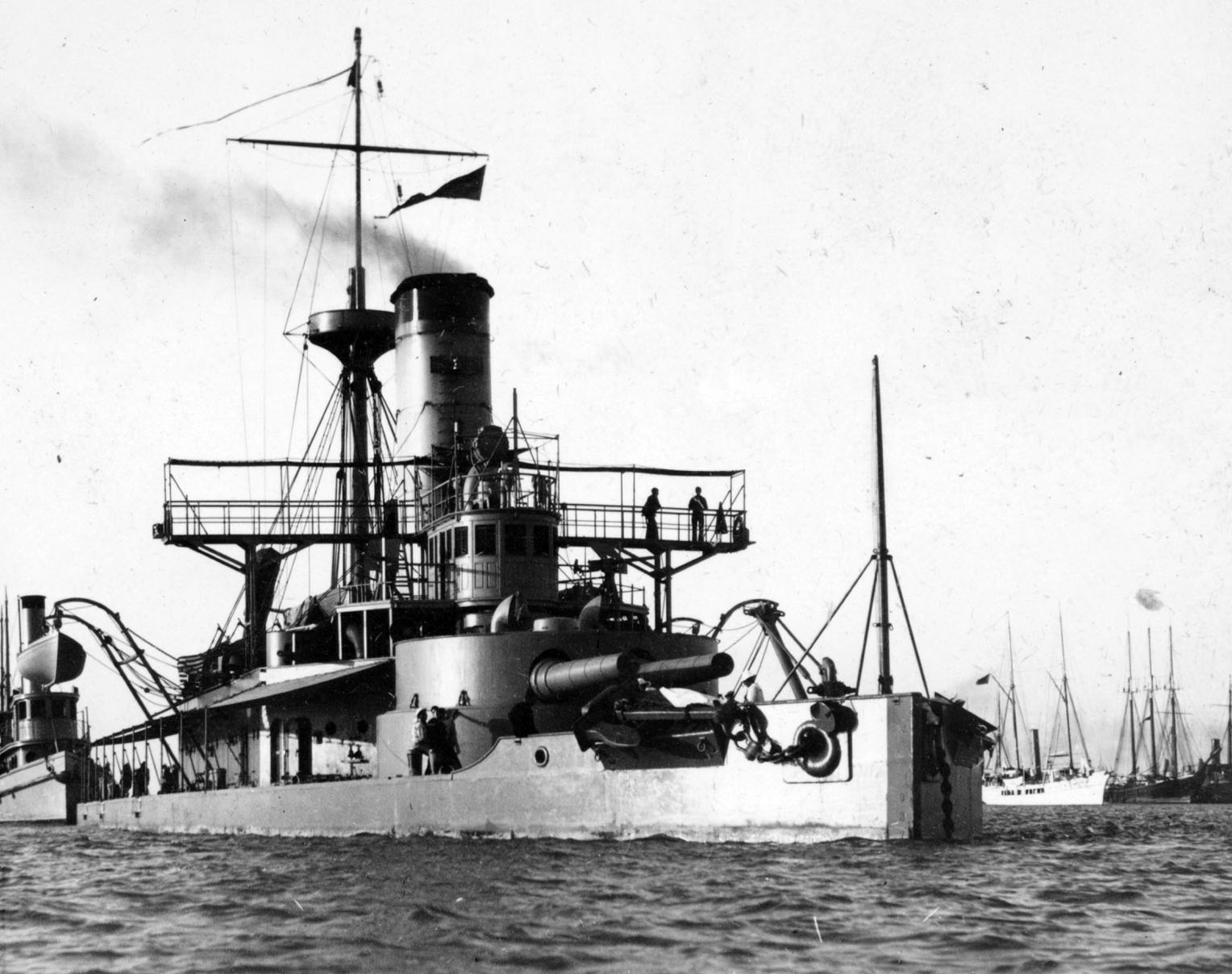
- USS Puritan (BM-1)

History

United States
- Name: USS Puritan
- Ordered: 23 June 1874
- Builder: Delaware River Iron Ship Building and Engine Works, Chester, Pennsylvania
- Laid down: 1874
- Launched: 6 December 1882
- Commissioned: 10 December 1896
- Decommissioned: 23 April 1910
- Stricken: 27 February 1918
- Fate: Sold, 26 January 1922

General characteristics
- Type: Puritan-class Monitor
- Displacement: 6,060 long tons (6,157 t)
- Length: 296 ft 3 in (90.30 m)
- Beam: 60 ft 1.5 in (18.326 m)
- Draft: 18 ft (5.5 m)
- Depth of hold: 5 ft 7 in (1.70 m)
- Propulsion: Steam engine
- Speed: 12.4 knots (23.0 km/h; 14.3 mph)
- Complement: 200
- Armament: 4 × 12 in (300 mm) breechloader rifles; 6 × 4 in (100 mm) breechloader rifles; 6 × 6-pounder guns
- Armor: Depth: 5 ft 7 in (1.70 m); Amidships: 14 in (360 mm); Barbettes: 14 in (360 mm); Turrets: 8 in (200 mm); Deck: 2 in (51 mm)

The second USS Puritan was a Puritan-class monitor in the United States Navy, constructed in 1882. She was the only ship in her class.

== Construction ==
On 23 June 1874 President Ulysses S. Grant's Secretary of the Navy George Robeson, in response to the Virginius Incident, ordered the USS Puritan of the American Civil War laid down (scrapped, redesigned, and rebuilt). Secretary Robeson's revised design of the "repaired" Puritan called for two turrets, as well as the superstructure, tall stack, and military mast that came to be identified with monitors built between 1889 and 1903.

Because of the level of disrepair of the original Puritan, a new Puritan was built by Delaware River Iron Ship Building and Engine Works of Chester, Pennsylvania and completed by the New York Navy Yard, Brooklyn, New York. Officially, the Navy records list this action as a repair and redesignation of the original Puritan, not the building of a new vessel, even though very few building materials from the original were included in the construction of the second. The new Puritan was launched 6 December 1882 and commissioned on 10 December 1896, with Captain John R. Bartlett in command.

By 1891, she had been equipped with four 12-inch (300 mm) guns in barbette turrets, with a plane of fire ten and a half feet (3.2 m) above the water. The armored belt was 5 feet 7 inches (1.70 m) deep, 14 inches (360 mm) thick amidships, with an armor deck of 2 inches (51 mm); barbettes, 14 inches (360 mm); and inclined turrets, 8 inches (200 mm). The original officer quarters, located below deck, were converted to additional crew quarters after new officer quarters were constructed in the superstructure.

== Service history ==
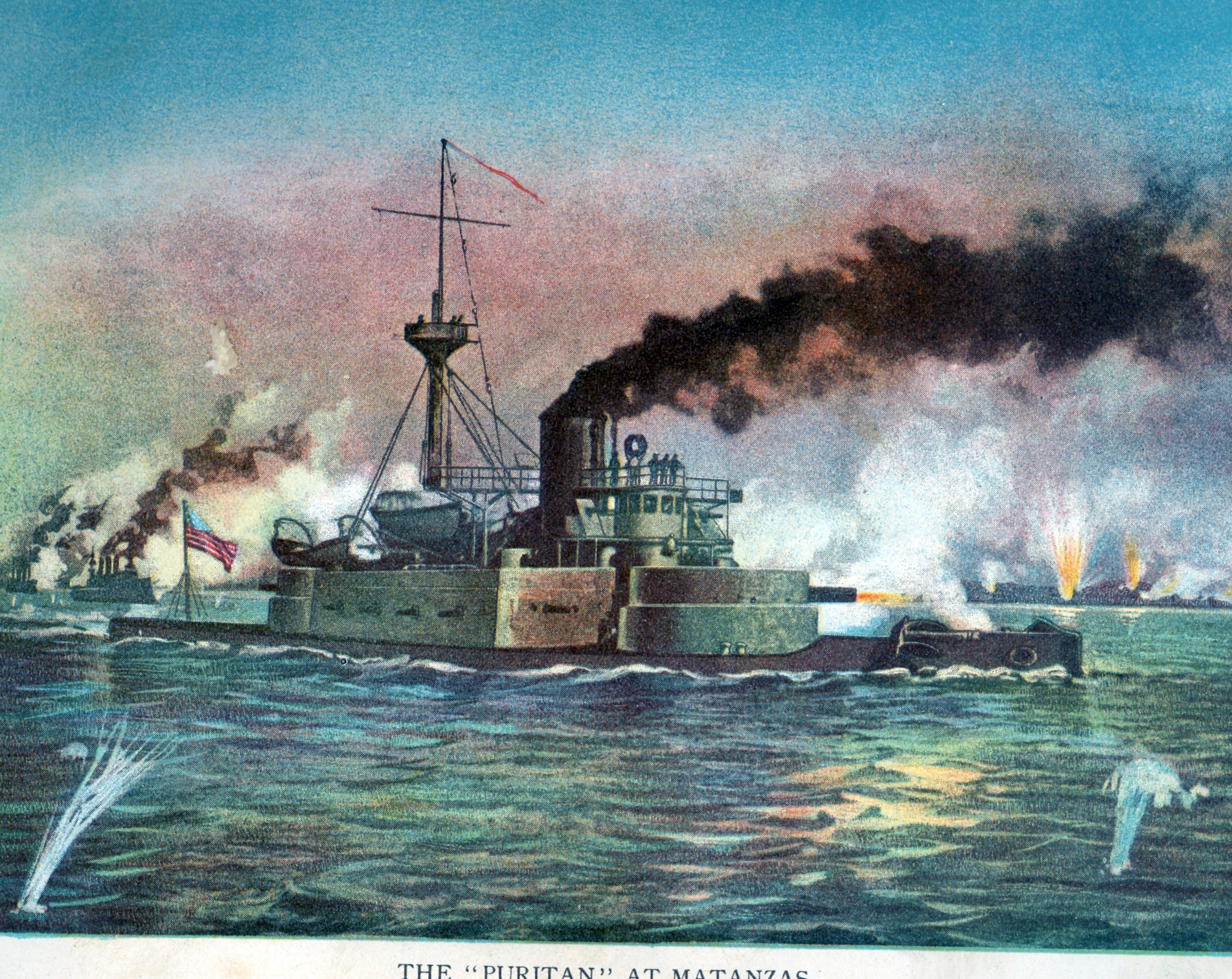
Puritan at Matanzas.

Puritan had a busy career in 1898 during the Spanish–American War. Assigned to the Cuban blockade in April, she joined New York and Cincinnati in shelling Matanzas on the 27th. After a stop at Key West in early May, she departed on the 20th to join the force building under Rear Admiral William T. Sampson that would eventually move against Santiago. Puritan linked up on the 22nd and Sampson moved his ships to Key Frances on the Nicholas Channel in order to execute his plan to contain the Spanish Fleet at Santiago. The success of Sampson's squadron at Santiago on 3 July resulted in almost the complete destruction of the Spanish Fleet. After Cuba, she sailed for Puerto Rico where she landed a party of US Marines and shelled the Spanish positions at the Battle of Fajardo.

Following wartime service, Puritan served as a practice ship for the Naval Academy from 1899 to 1902. She was decommissioned on 16 April 1903 at Philadelphia but was recommissioned 3 June to serve as a receiving ship at League Island. In 1904, she was loaned to the Naval Militia of Washington, D.C. and served there until 14 September 1909. Puritan then moved to Norfolk, Virginia where she was again decommissioned on 23 April 1910.

In March 1910, it was proposed by a commodore that the monitors in service with the U.S. Navy, including Puritan, Miantonomoh, Terror and Amphitrite, be used as forts near Key West in order to make it into "an American Gibraltar." The Spanish–American War and the Panama Canal (under construction in 1910) had caused Key West's military importance to rise because of its geographical location. It was pointed out that the defenses of Fort Zachary Taylor on the island were not enough, as ships could sit seven miles south of the fort (outside the range of its guns) and shell Key West. The proposal advocated the placement of monitors in strategic locations around Key West. Dykes of "piling, rock and riprap" would then be constructed around the ships. Water inside of these dykes would be pumped out to be replaced by dirt, creating an artificial island that was a "complete, modern double-turreted fort".

She was struck from the Navy List 27 February 1918 and, with the submarine USS Plunger (SS-2) on board, was one of several vessels sold on 26 January 1922, to J. G. Hitner and W. F. Cutler of Philadelphia.
