= Miantonomoh-class monitor =

American Civil War-era navy ship

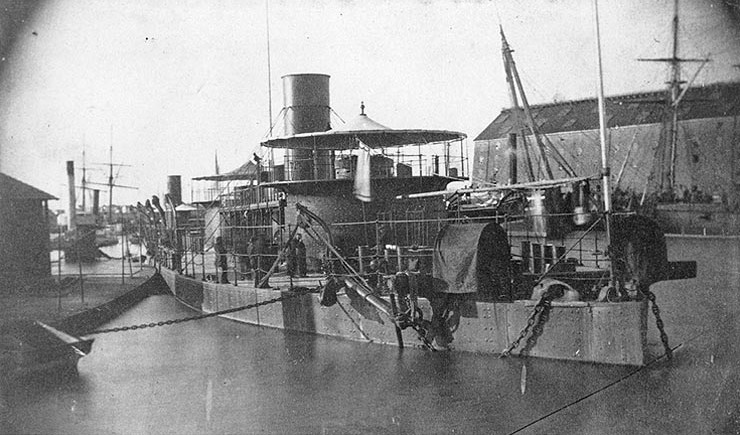
- USS Miantonomoh in Washington Navy Yard, 1865

Class overview
- Name: Miantonomah class
- Operators: United States Navy
- Preceded by: Canonicus class
- Succeeded by: USS Dictator
- Subclasses: Agamenticus, Miantonomah, Tonawanda
- Built: 1862–1865
- In service: 1864–1872
- Completed: 4
- Scrapped: 4

General characteristics
- Type: Monitor
- Displacement: 3,400 long tons (3,455 t)
- Length: 258 ft 6 in (78.8 m)
- Beam: 52 ft 9 in (16.1 m)
- Draft: 12 ft 8 in (3.9 m)
- Installed power: 4 × Martin boilers; 1,400 ihp (1,000 kW)
- Propulsion: 2 × shafts; 2–4 × steam engines
- Speed: 9–10 knots (17–19 km/h; 10–12 mph)
- Complement: 150–167
- Armament: 2 × twin 15 in (380 mm) smoothbore Dahlgren guns
- Armor: Side: 4.5 in (114 mm); Gun turrets: 11 in (279 mm); Deck: 1.5 in (38 mm); Pilothouse: 8 in (203 mm)

The Miantonomoh class consisted of four monitors built for the Union Navy during the U.S. Civil War, but only one ship was completed early enough to participate in the war. They were broken up in 1874–1875.

== Design and construction ==
Designed by John Lenthall. The hull of the monitors were of a conventional form, but were constructed of wood, not iron. The ships displaced 3,400 long tons (3,500 t) and were 258 feet 6 inches (78.79 m) in length with a 53 feet (16 m) beam and 13 feet (4.0 m) draft. Freeboard was 31 inches (79 cm), which left part of the hull exposed, this was covered several inches of armor plate backed by oak. The turrets, with 11 inches (280 mm) of an armor, were similar to the turrets on the Passaic class, only slightly larger. There were pilothouses fitted on the top of each turret. A light hurricane deck was constructed between the turrets, along with a tall funnel and a tall ventilation shaft. There were some variations within the class which leads some sources to identify them as four one-ship classes. One difference was that Tonawanda's turrets were closer together than the other three ships in the class.

By the 1870s the wooden hulls had already begun to rot, and the ships were taken out of service. As part of Secretary of the Navy George M. Robeson's ambitious plans to overhaul and modernize ships of the Navy, the ships were moved to shipyards in 1874, ostensibly for "repairs". On 23 June 1874 Congress authorized funds for the purpose of "completing the repairs" of four double‑turreted monitors. However, the "repairs" consisted of constructing of new vessels under the guise of repairing the old ones. They were broken up in 1874–1875 and but few of their materials were used in the building of the larger, more heavily armored, iron‑hulled "New Navy" monitors.

== Ships of class ==
Name	Builder	Laid down	Launched	Commissioned	Fate
Agamenticus	Portsmouth Navy Yard	1862	19 March 1863	5 May 1864	Scrapped, 1874
Miantonomoh	New York Navy Yard	1862	15 August 1863	18 September 1865	Scrapped, 1875
Monadnock	Boston Navy Yard	1862	23 March 1863	4 October 1864	Scrapped, 1874
Tonawanda	Philadelphia Navy Yard	1862	6 May 1863	12 October 1865	Scrapped, 1874

=== Agamenticus ===
Agamenticus operated off the northeast coast of the United States from Maine to Massachusetts until she was decommissioned at the Boston Navy Yard on 30 September 1865. Renamed Terror on 15 June 1869, the monitor joined the North Atlantic Fleet on 27 May 1870. She primarily operated between Key West, Florida, and Havana, Cuba, over the next two years. Terror, towed by the tug Powhatan, headed north for Philadelphia where she was placed out of commission and laid up on 10 June 1872. During this time, from 1872 to 1874, her deterioration progressively worsened, with dry rot eating away her timbers. She was broken up in 1874.

=== Miantonomoh ===
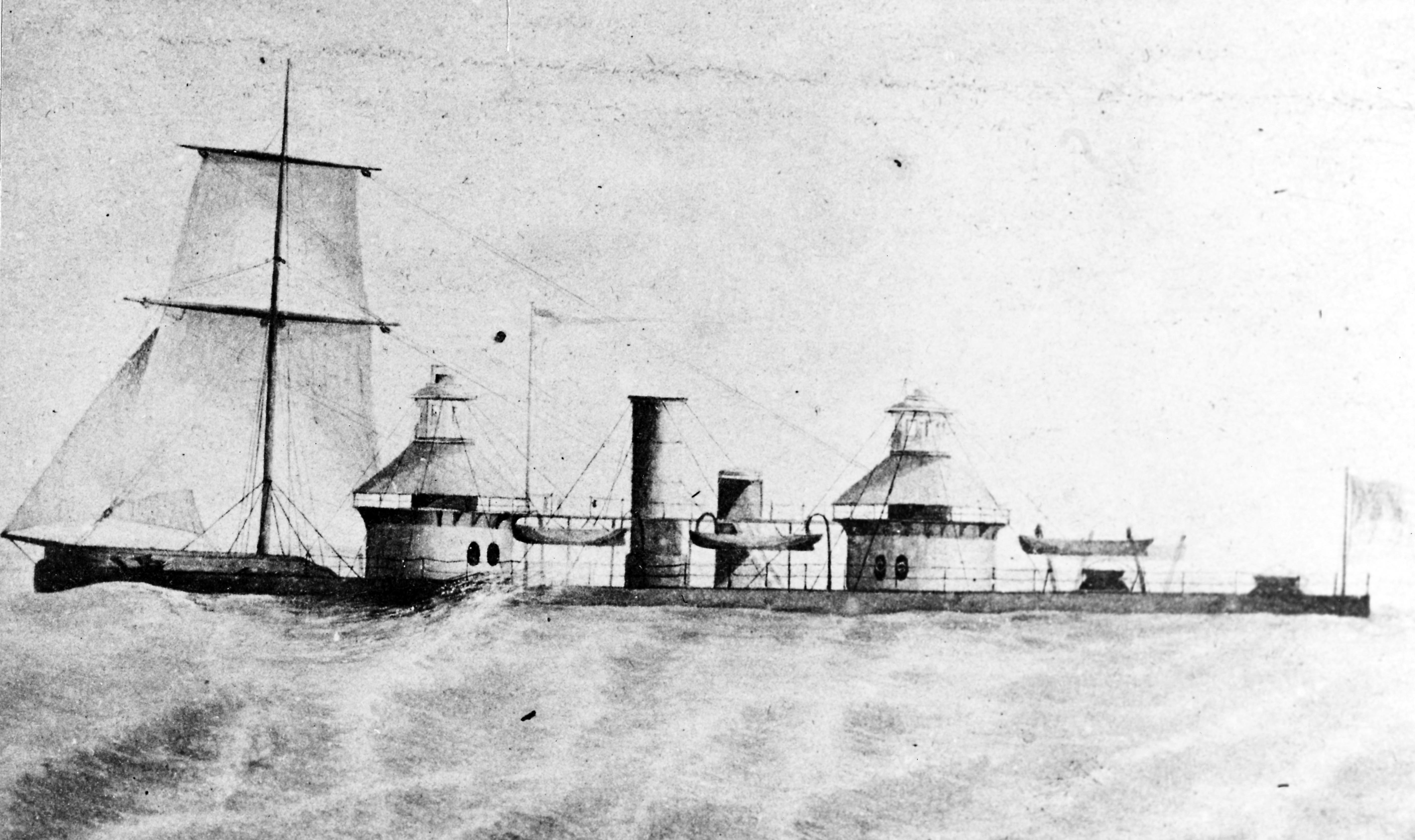
USS Miantonomoh under full sail

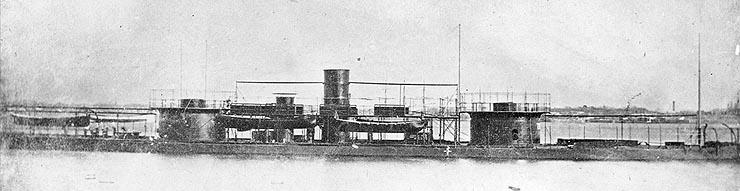
USS Agamenticus

Assigned to the North Atlantic Squadron, Miantonomoh cruised for a short time along the east coast, thence steamed to the Washington Navy Yard where she remained until April 1866. In late April she sailed to New York and there prepared for an extended cruise to European waters.

She sailed with steamers Augusta and Ashuelot 6 May. After touching at Halifax, Nova Scotia, she reached St. John's, Newfoundland, 23 May. Departing St. John's 5 June, the three ships crossed the Atlantic in less than 11 days. After reaching Queenstown 16 June, Miantonomoh steamed via Portsmouth to Cherbourg, France. She returned to the English coast 7 July and a week later received visitors including British royalty, government officials, and members of the press, all of whom viewed her with wonderment and amazement. Her departure in naval design caused considerable comment in the English press, and the Times exclaimed: "The wolf is in our fold; the whole flock at its mercy." Departing 15 July, Miantonomoh steamed to Denmark; thence, on the 31st, she entered the Baltic Sea en route to Russia. Eleven ships of the Russian Navy, including four monitors, met her at Helsingfors, and escorted her to Kronshtadt where she arrived 5 August. She visited Stockholm, Sweden, in mid‑September; thence, she arrived Kiel, Prussia, 1 October. She left 3 October and steamed to Hamburg where she arrived the 6th. Miantonomoh called at French, Portuguese, Spanish, and Italian ports during the next 6 months. In company with Augusta, Miantonomoh departed Gibraltar 15 May 1867. Steaming via the Canary and Cape Verde, Islands, Caribbean ports and the Bahamas, she anchored off League Island, Philadelphia, 22 July, thus completing a cruise of more than 17,700 nautical miles (32,800 km; 20,400 mi). Miantonomoh was decommissioned at Philadelphia 26 July 1867 and was laid up at League Island.

Miantonomoh recommissioned 15 November 1869. She steamed to New England and continued her operations in the North Atlantic station until 28 July 1870 when she decommissioned at Boston. She was broken up in 1875.

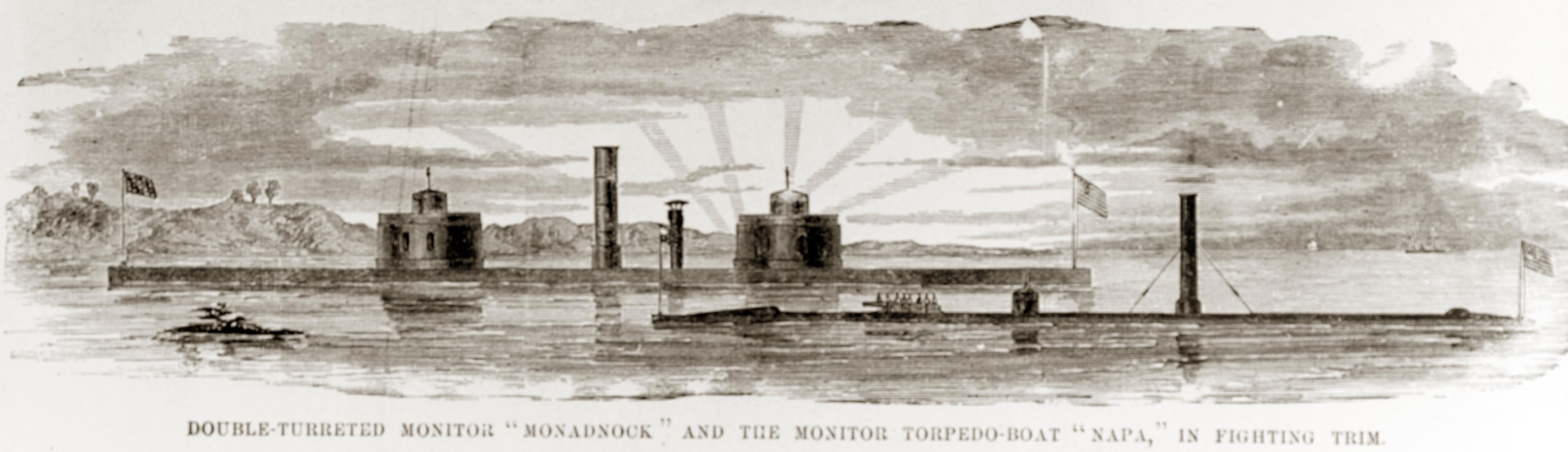
USS Napa and Monadnock

=== Monadnock ===
The only monitor of the class to see action during the Civil War Monadnock steamed to Norfolk, Virginia, and there Comdr. Enoch G. Parrott took command 20 November 1864. On 13 December she departed Norfolk for the assault against Fort Fisher. On the morning of Christmas Eve, she closed the entrance of the river, guarded by Fort Fisher. At less than 1,200 yards (1,100 m) from shore she began bombarding the fortification and continued throughout the day. The attack was renewed 13 January 1865. Through the 15th, Monadnock again shelled the fort's defenses, disabling many of the guns. During the action, perhaps the largest amphibious operation in American history, prior to World War II, Monadnock was struck five times.

After this Monadnock turned toward Charleston, South Carolina. She crossed over the Bar on the 20th, after its evacuation by Confederate troops. On 19 February, while still in the Charleston area; she sent a volunteer crew to take possession of blockade runner Deer.

After a stay at Port Royal, she returned to Hampton Roads 15 March. On 2 April, she steamed up the James River to support the final assault on Richmond. Returning to Hampton Roads 7 April, she sailed out into the Atlantic on the 17th, en route to Havana, where she kept watch over CSS Stonewall. Back at Norfolk by 12 June, she entered the Philadelphia Navy Yard on the 20th to fit out for her cruise to the west coast.

Monadnock departed Philadelphia 5 October; with Vanderbilt, Tuscarora, and Powhatan. After stops at numerous South American ports, she transited the Straits of Magellan and continued on to San Francisco, anchoring off that city 21 June 1866. On 26 June she proceeded to Vallejo and entered the Mare Island Navy Yard where she decommissioned 30 June.

=== Tonawanda ===
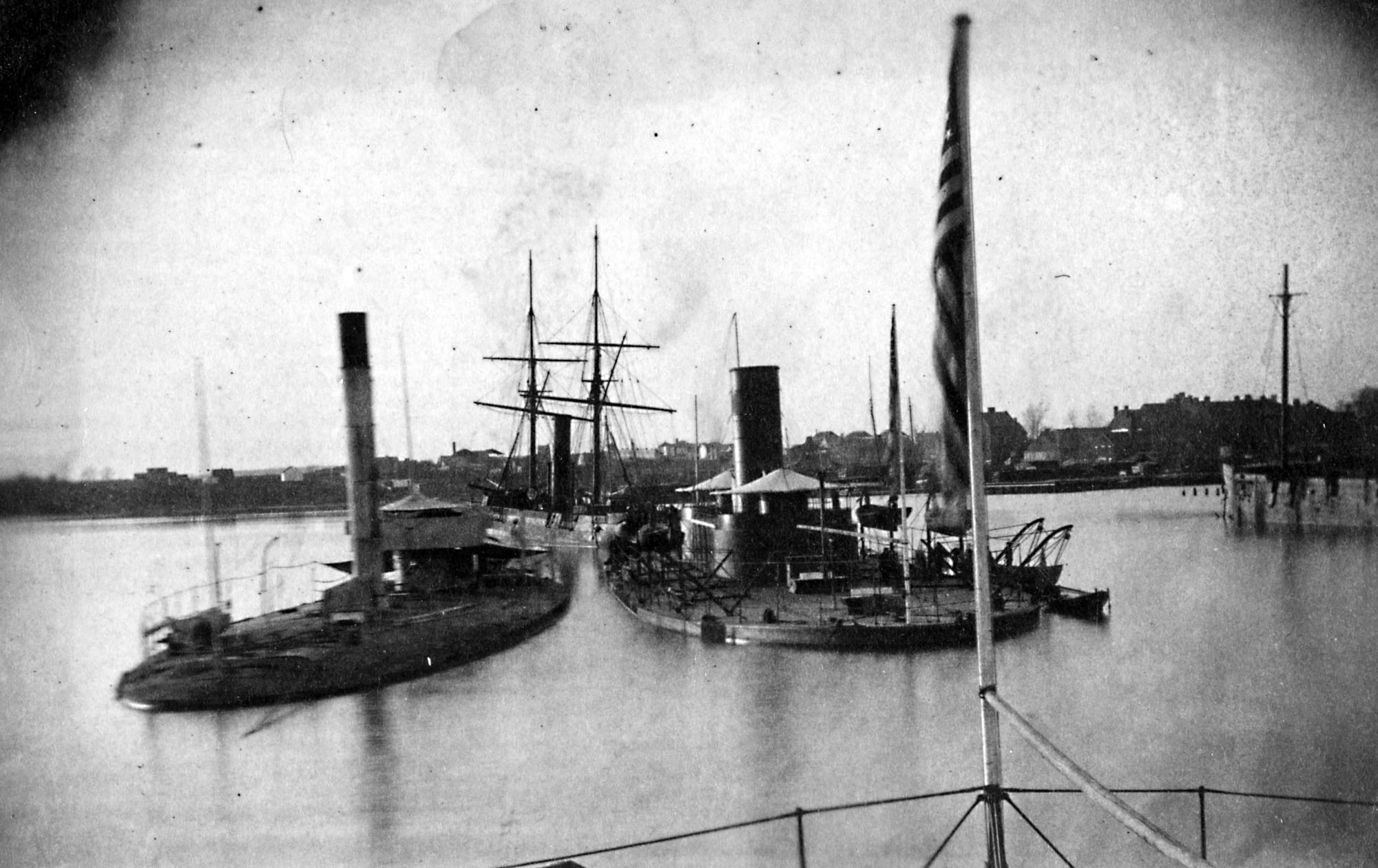
USS Chimo and Tonawanda photographed of the stern of USS Minatanomoh.

Completed too late for service in the Civil War, Tonawanda, was decommissioned at the Washington Navy Yard on 22 December 1865. Reactivated on 23 October 1866 for duty as a training ship at the United States Naval Academy. She was renamed Amphitrite on 15 June 1869. When her assignment at Annapolis ended in 1872, she was taken to the Delaware River and broken up in 1873 and 1874.

== See also ==
- Amphitrite (BM-2)
- Monadnock (BM-3)
- Terror (BM-4)
- Miantonomoh (BM-5)

== Bibliography ==
=== Online resources ===
- "USS Miantonomoh (1865) Ironclad Monitor (1865)". www.MilitaryFactory.com. 15 February 2016.
- "USS MIANTONOMOH". NavSource. 20 March 2015.
- "Terror I (Monitor)". Dictionary of American Naval Fighting Ships. Naval History and Heritage Command. 29 September 2015.
- "Miantonomoh I (Monitor)". Dictionary of American Naval Fighting Ships. Naval History and Heritage Command. 10 August 2015.
- "Monadnock I (ScStr)". Dictionary of American Naval Fighting Ships. Naval History and Heritage Command. 10 August 2015.
- "Tonawanda I (Mon)". Dictionary of American Naval Fighting Ships. Naval History and Heritage Command. 30 September 2015.

=== Further reading ===
- Canney, Donald L. (1993). The Old Steam Navy: The Ironclads, 1842–1885. Vol. 2. Annapolis, Maryland: Naval Institute Press. ISBN 0-87021-586-8.
- Gibbons, Tony (1989). Warships and Naval Battles of the Civil War. New York: Gallery Books. ISBN 0-8317-9301-5.
- Olmstead, Edwin; Stark, Wayne E. & Tucker, Spencer C. (1997). The Big Guns: Civil War Siege, Seacoast, and Naval Cannon. Alexandria Bay, New York: Museum Restoration Service. ISBN 0-88855-012-X.
- Silverstone, Paul H. (2006). Civil War Navies 1855–1883. The U.S. Navy Warship Series. New York: Routledge. ISBN 0-415-97870-X.
