= USS Agamenticus =

United States Navy ship, 1863

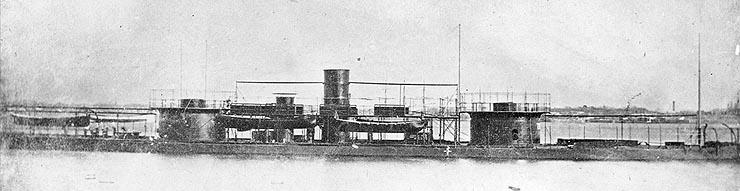
- Agamenticus shortly after her completion in 1865

History

United States
- Name: Agamenticus
- Namesake: Mount Agamenticus
- Builder: Portsmouth Navy Yard, Kittery, Maine
- Laid down: 1862
- Launched: 19 March 1863
- Commissioned: 5 May 1865
- Decommissioned: 10 June 1872
- Renamed: Terror, 15 June 1869
- Fate: Scrapped, 1874

General characteristics
- Class & type: Miantonomoh-class monitor
- Displacement: 3,295 long tons (3,348 t)
- Length: 261 ft (79.6 m) (o/a)
- Beam: 52 ft (15.8 m)
- Draft: 12 ft 3 in (3.7 m)
- Depth: 15 ft 6 in (4.7 m)
- Installed power: 4 Martin water-tube boilers; 1,400 ihp (1,044 kW)
- Propulsion: 2 shafts; 2 vibrating-lever steam engines
- Speed: 9 knots (17 km/h; 10 mph)
- Complement: 150 officers and enlisted men
- Armament: 2 × twin 15 in (381 mm) smoothbore Dahlgren guns
- Armor: Side: 5 in (127 mm); Turrets: 10 in (254 mm); Deck: 1.5 in (38 mm); Pilothouse: 8 in (203 mm)

USS Agamenticus was one of four Miantonomoh-class monitors built for the United States Navy during the American Civil War. Commissioned as the war was ending in May 1865, the ironclad saw no combat and was decommissioned in September and placed in reserve. The ship was reactivated in 1870, having been renamed Terror the previous year, and was assigned to the North Atlantic Fleet where she served in the Caribbean Sea. The monitor was decommissioned again in 1872 and was sold for scrap two years later. The Navy Department evaded the Congressional refusal to order new ships by claiming that the Civil War-era ship was being repaired while building a new monitor of the same name.

== Description ==
The Miantonomoh class was designed by John Lenthall, Chief of the Bureau of Construction and Repair, although the ships varied somewhat in their details. Agamenticus was 261 feet (80 m) long overall, had a beam of 52 feet (15.8 m) and had a draft of 12 feet 3 inches (3.7 m). The ship had a depth of hold of 15 feet 6 inches (4.7 m), a tonnage of 1,564 tons burthen and displaced 3,295 long tons (3,348 t). She was fitted with a breakwater to protect the forward gun turret from flooding in high seas. Her crew consisted of 150 officers and enlisted men.

Agamenticus was powered by a pair of two-cylinder horizontal vibrating-lever steam engines, each driving one four-bladed propeller about 10 feet (3 m) in diameter using steam generated by four Martin vertical water-tube boilers. The engines were rated at 1,400 indicated horsepower (1,000 kW) and gave the ship a top speed of 9 knots (17 km/h; 10 mph). She was designed to carry 300 long tons (305 t) of coal.

=== Armament and armor ===
Her main battery consisted of four smoothbore, muzzle-loading, 15-inch (381 mm) Dahlgren guns mounted in two twin-gun turrets, one each fore and aft of the single funnel. Each gun weighed approximately 43,000 pounds (20,000 kg). They could fire a 350-pound (158.8 kg) shell up to a range of 2,100 yards (1,900 m) at an elevation of +7°.

The sides of the hull of the Miantonomoh-class ships were protected by five layers of 1-inch (25 mm) wrought-iron plates that tapered at their bottom edge down to total of 3 inches (76 mm), backed by 12–14 inches (305–356 mm) of wood. The armor of the gun turret consisted of ten layers of one-inch plates and the pilot house had eight layers. The ship's deck was protected by armor 1.5 inches (38 mm) thick. The bases of the funnel and the ventilator were also protected by unknown thicknesses of armor.

== Construction and career ==
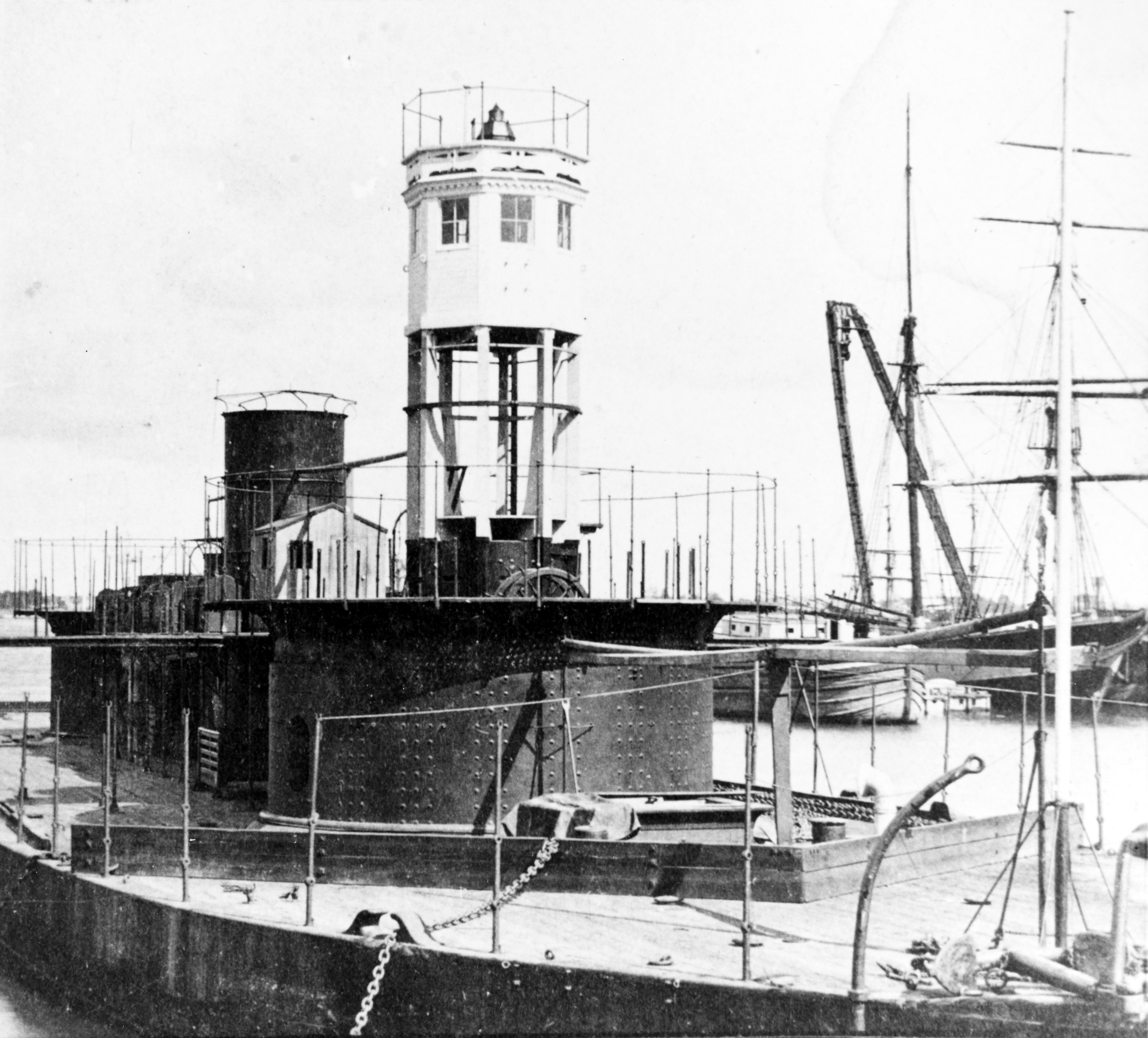
A bow view of the monitor circa 1872–1874 while laid up, showing the elevated pilot house and breakwater

Agamenticus was named after Mount Agamenticus in York County, Maine. The monitor was laid down in 1862 at the Portsmouth Navy Yard in Kittery, Maine and launched on 19 March 1863. To speed her construction, her hull was built from green wood. While still building in early 1864, she was modified with the addition of a turret-roof-height "hurricane deck" that stretched between the two turrets and around the funnel and main ventilator to improve her navigational facilities. Agamenticus was commissioned on 5 May 1865 and was prepared to fight the Confederate ironclad CSS Stonewall that was at sea somewhere in the Atlantic Ocean at that time. Stonewall went elsewhere and the monitor operated off the northeastern coast of the United States until she was decommissioned at the Boston Navy Yard on 30 September. Agamenticus remained laid up for nearly five years and was renamed Terror on 15 June 1869.

Before she was formally recommissioned on 27 May 1870, the ship was tasked in January to join a small group of ships under the command of Admiral David Farragut that escorted the British ironclad HMS Monarch to Portland, Maine, as it ferried the body of the philanthropist George Peabody from London to his final resting place. Terror was assigned to the North Atlantic Fleet when she was reactivated. At that time it mostly operated in the Caribbean Sea, protecting American citizens and interests during the Ten Years' War in Spanish Cuba and unrest in the West Indies.

The monitor was relieved of her assignment at Key West, Florida, on 17 May 1872 and she was towed to the Philadelphia Navy Yard, Pennsylvania, by the tugboat USS Powhatan. Terror was again laid up on 10 June. Around this time the ship was fitted with an elevated wooden pilot house above the armored pilot house on the forward turret. Two years later, her wooden hull was rotting and she was sold for scrap. Although Congress was informed by the Navy Department that the Civil War-era ship was being repaired, a new iron-hulled monitor of the same name was built with repair money and the proceeds of her sale because Congress refused to fund any new construction at this time.
