= Charles James Barclay (admiral) =

United States Navy officer

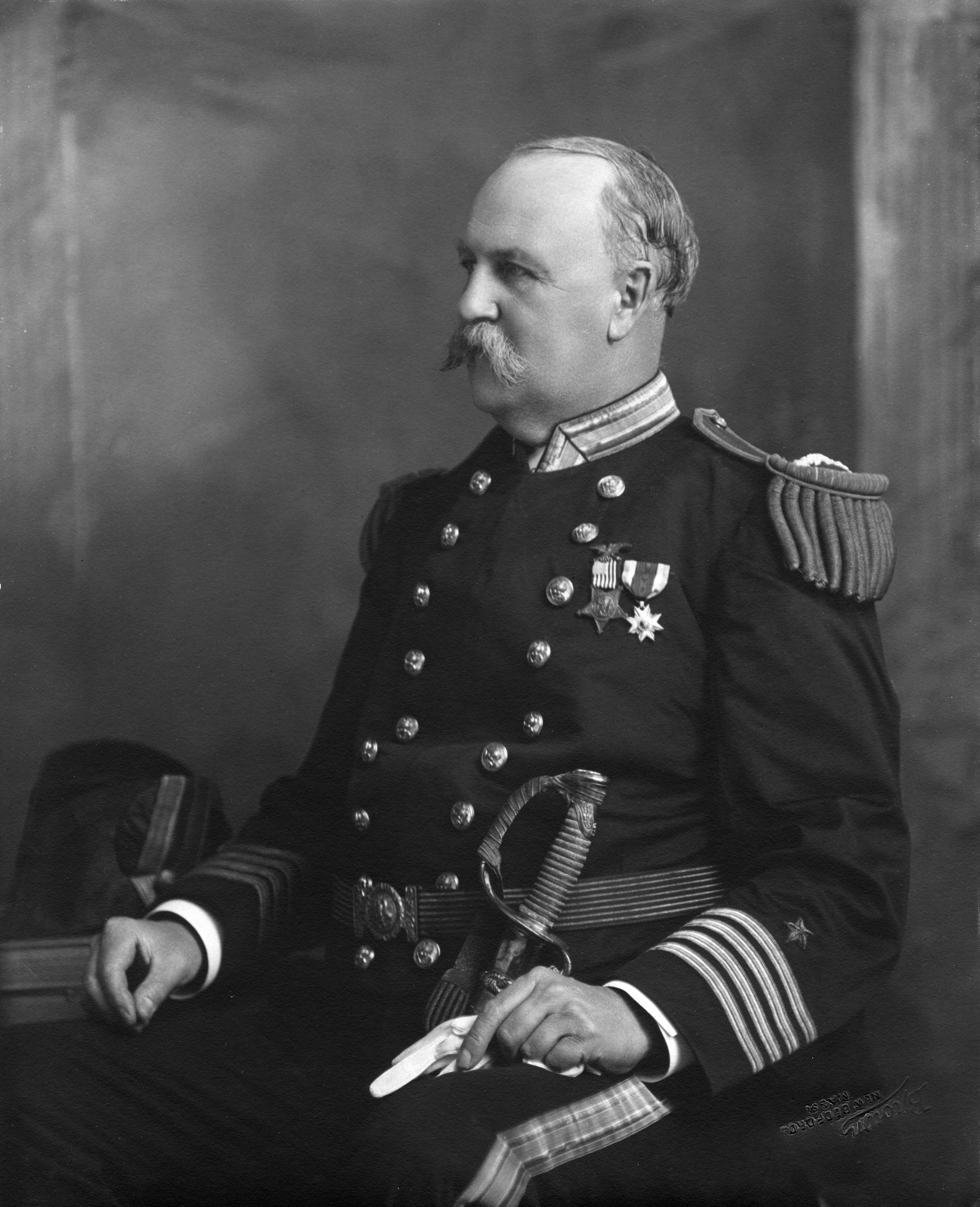
- During Barclay's time as Captain (between 1896 and 1903)
- Born: 8 September 1843; Philadelphia, Pennsylvania
- Died: 26 September 1910 (aged 67); Brookline, Massachusetts
- Military career
- Allegiance: United States of America
- Branch: United States Navy
- Service years: 1860–1905
- Rank: Rear admiral
- Commands: USS Amphitrite
- Conflicts: American Civil War; Spanish–American War

Rear Admiral Charles James Barclay (8 September 1843 – 26 September 1909) was a United States Navy officer.

== Biography ==
Barclay was born in Philadelphia to William James Barclay and Anna Musgrave. He entered the U.S. Naval Academy on 21 September 1860 with the rank of acting midshipman, graduating on 6 October 1863, as an acting ensign.

During the Civil War Barclay took part in the capture of the Confederate cruiser CSS Florida at Bahia, Brazil, by USS Wachusett in October 1864, and served on board the Kearsarge in 1865–66.

He rose through the ranks post-war, being promoted to master on 10 May 1866, to lieutenant on 21 February 1867, to lieutenant commander on 12 March 1868, to commander on 25 November 1881, and to captain on 1 October 1896.

Barclay recommissioned the monitor Amphitrite (BM-2) at Norfolk on 2 October 1897, commanding her during the Spanish–American War, and taking part in the bombardment of San Juan, Puerto Rico, on 12 May 1898, and then serving on blockade duty. He was still in command of her in 1899.

He was the commandant of the Naval War Academy from 1900, and was therefore delegated captain of the Navy Yards at Boston and then at Puget Sound.

Barclay was promoted to rear admiral on 20 November 1903, and retired in 1905.

He died of diabetes at his home in Brookline, Massachusetts, aged 66.
