= USS Amphitrite (BM-2) =

American naval ironclad vessel

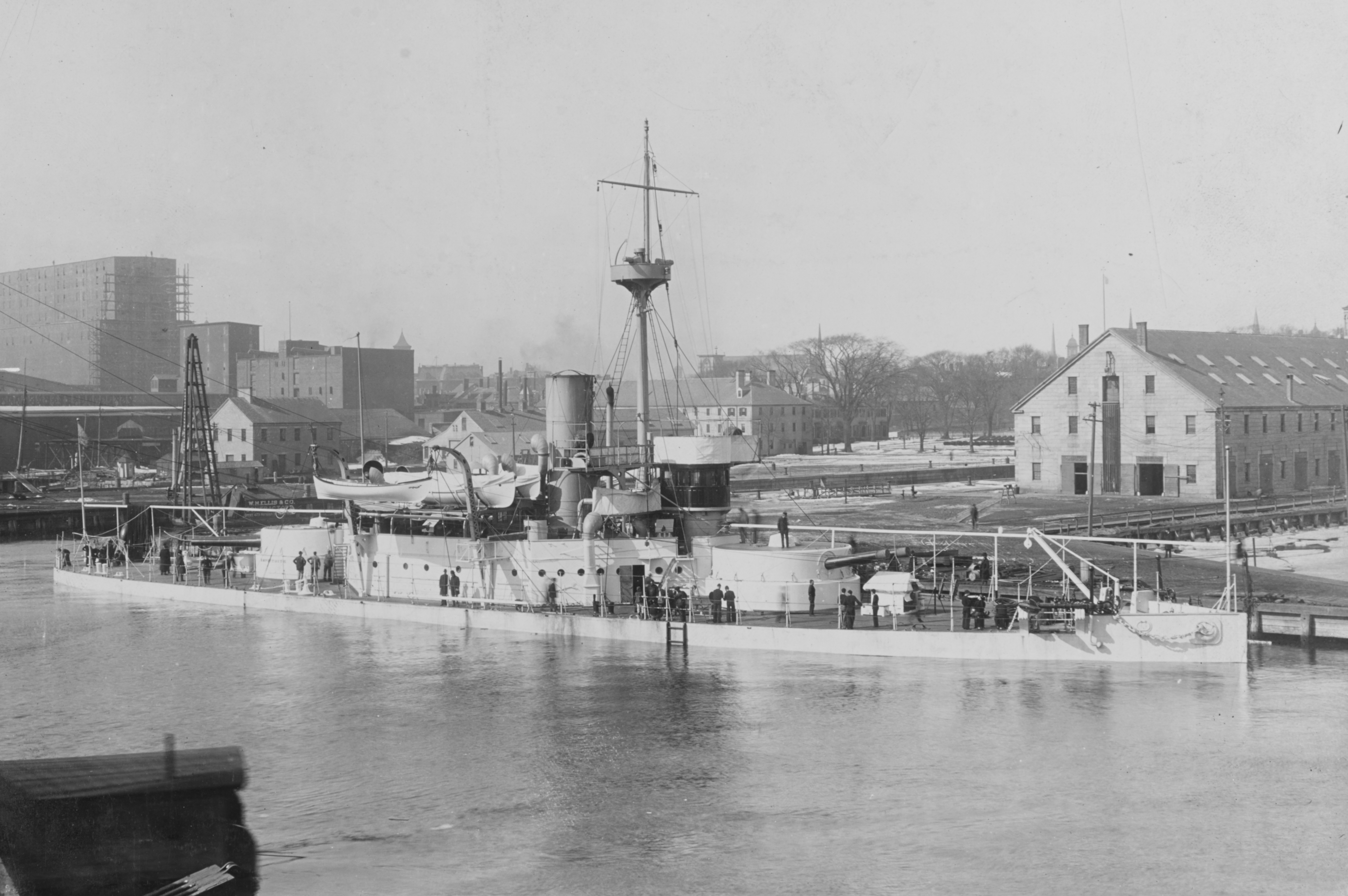
- The USS Amphitrite moored at the Boston Navy Yard.

History

United States
- Name: Amphitrite
- Ordered: 23 June 1874
- Cost: $1,487,277 (hull and machinery)
- Laid down: 1874
- Launched: 7 June 1883
- Commissioned: 23 April 1895
- Decommissioned: 30 November 1901
- Recommissioned: 1 December 1902
- Decommissioned: 3 August 1907
- Recommissioned: 14 June 1910
- Decommissioned: 31 May 1919
- Stricken: 24 July 1919
- Fate: scrapped, 1952

General characteristics
- Class & type: Amphitrite class monitor
- Displacement: 3,990 tons
- Length: 262 ft 9 in (80.09 m)
- Beam: 55 ft 1 in (16.79 m)
- Draft: 14 ft 6 in (4.42 m)
- Speed: 10.5 kn (19.4 km/h; 12.1 mph)
- Complement: 171
- Armament: 4 × 10 in (254 mm)/caliber guns; 2 × 4 in (102 mm) guns; 2 × 6-pounder guns; 2 × 3-pounder guns; 2 × 37 mm (1.5 in) guns; 7 × 1-pounder guns; 1 × .30 in (7.6 mm) Colt machine gun

The second USS Amphitrite—the lead ship in her class of iron-hulled, twin-screw monitors—was laid down (dismantled and reconstructed), on June 23, 1874, by order of President Ulysses S. Grant's Secretary of Navy George M. Robeson at Wilmington, Delaware, by the Harlan and Hollingsworth yard; launched on 7 June 1883; sponsored by Miss Nellie Benson, the daughter of a Harlan and Hollingsworth official; and commissioned at the Norfolk Navy Yard, Portsmouth, Virginia, on 23 April 1895, Captain William C. Wise in command.

Rapid changes in naval technology and doctrine during the two decades she was under construction had repeatedly delayed her progress, and she was redesigned twice while still under construction.

== Service history ==
=== Early career ===
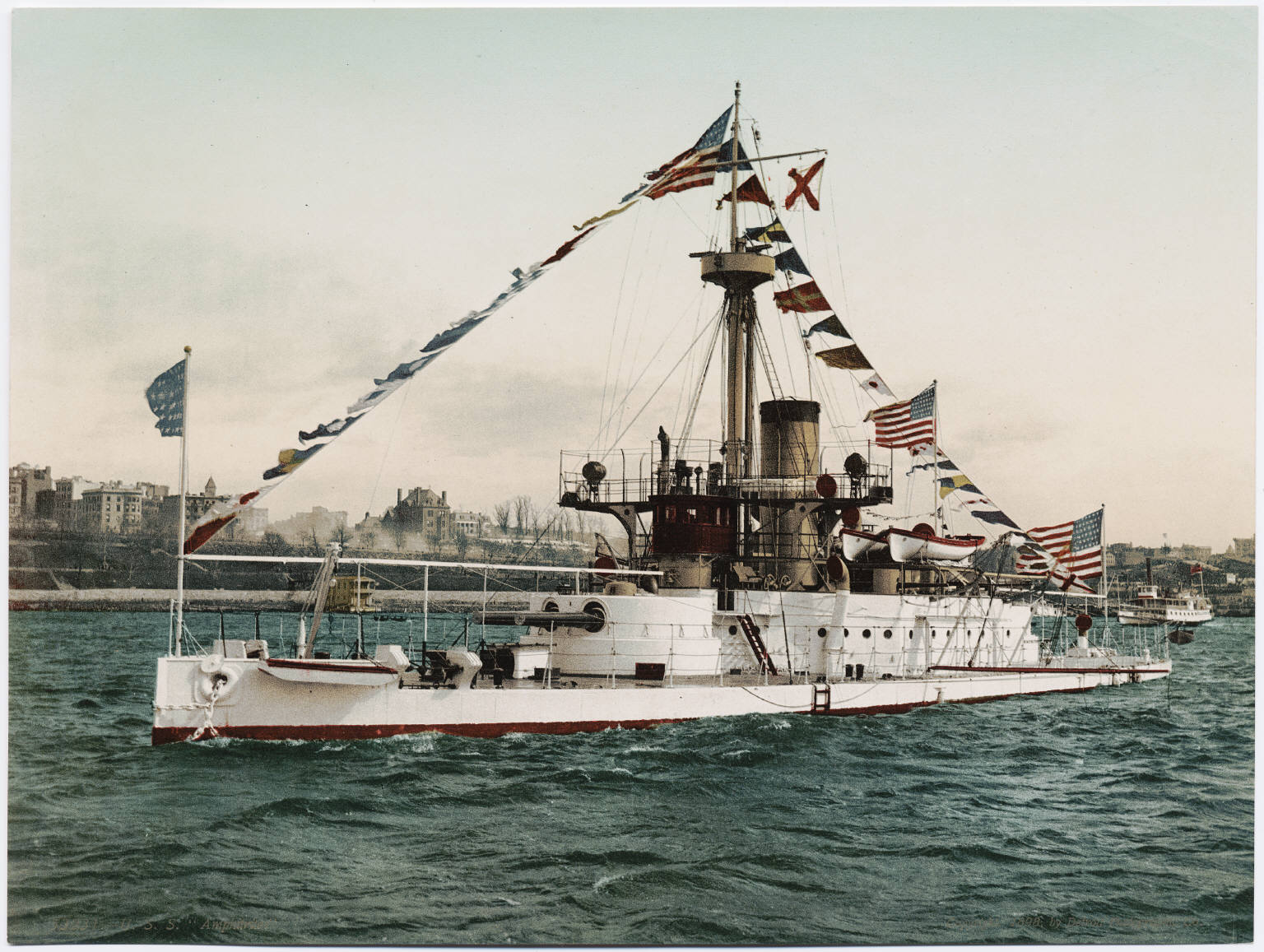
Color postcard from 1897

During the course of the late spring and summer, the monitor, assigned to the North Atlantic Squadron, visited eastern seaboard ports: Savannah, Georgia (17–23 May), Port Royal, South Carolina (23 May-8 June), Brunswick, Georgia (23–28 July), Southport, North Carolina, (2–10 August) and a return visit to Port Royal (12–20 August), interspersing these port visits with operations out of Hampton Roads and Chesapeake Bay. Early in the course of this period of operations, the combination of defects in the design of monitors in general (inadequate ventilation for engine room forces, particularly) and the summer heat produced hellish conditions aboard Amphitrite, in some cases actually felling members of the "black gang" who had to carry out their tasks in the ship's engine and fire rooms.

Following post-shakedown repairs and alterations at Norfolk, Amphitrite sailed on 20 November 1895 for Annapolis, Maryland, arriving there on the following day. Dropping down to the York River and Lynnhaven Bay soon thereafter, the monitor conducted target practice at Hampton Roads before returning to Norfolk. She then proceeded south from Norfolk on 13 December 1895 for the lower eastern seaboard of the United States. She visited Charleston, South Carolina en route, and reached Key West on 9 January 1896. She remained at Key West, drilling naval militia, for six months, departing the Florida port on 10 June for a succession of ports, Brunswick, Savannah, and Southport, ultimately arriving back at Norfolk on 29 June. She served on naval militia instruction at Norfolk until 9 July, when she accompanied the Atlantic Squadron on drills off Tolchester Beach, Maryland. She spent the next several months operating between Norfolk, Charleston, and Tompkinsville, Staten Island, into early May 1897. While operating out of Charleston between February and April 1897, she conducted underway training on the average of three days per month.

Detached from the Atlantic Squadron on 7 May 1897, Amphitrite served as a training ship for the instruction of gun captains. As such, she was apparently placed in ordinary at Norfolk, since she was not recommissioned until 2 October 1897, with Capt. Charles J. Barclay in command. The men she placed in service soon proved to be invaluable in the war with Spain. Some 45 trained gun captains "who had received exact training fit to match the modern gun", gave a "good account of themselves" in action against Spanish ships. Clearing Hampton Roads on 5 October, the monitor visited New Bedford, Massachusetts, from 7–23 October, and Tompkinsville from 24 October-12 November, before she returned south, to Lambert's Point, Virginia, arriving on 14 November.

Clearing Hampton Roads on 16 November, Amphitrite reached Port Royal on 19 November, and remained there for over a month. After visiting Charleston from 23 December 1897 – 1 January 1898, she then returned to Port Royal, remaining there for over three months.

=== Spanish–American War ===
In February 1898, tensions between the United States and Spain served as the backdrop for the explosion, in Havana Harbor, of the armored cruiser Maine. As the U.S. and Spain moved toward war, a flurry of orders began deploying the United States Navy to be ready for hostilities. Amphitrite sailed from Port Royal on 5 April, and arrived at Key West on the 8th. She remained there until the 22nd, before she operated from that place from 22 to 27 April. She was at sea when the U.S. declared war on Spain, beginning the Spanish–American War.

On 1 May, Amphitrite and her sister ship Terror departed Key West, and shortly thereafter joined Rear Admiral William T. Sampson's fleet on the way east from its cruise off the coast of Cuba in search of Admiral Pascual Cervera's squadron. Because the monitors could not carry large amounts of coal, Sampson directed that the monitors be towed by the heavier ships. Iowa drew Amphitrite, a task recalled with little affection by the former's commanding officer, Capt. Robley D. Evans, in his autobiography:

"When we reached the rendezvous, late in the evening, we found there, among other ships, two monitors—the Terror and the Amphitrite ... I was directed to tow the Amphitrite with the Iowa. The sea was very smooth, and we were soon pulling her along at nine knots, but before the job was finished I wished I had never seen a monitor. When once out from the protection of the shoals the sea began to rise, and soon everything in the way of towlines had been parted, and it was only when we slowed down to seven knots or less that we could make anything hold. We found ourselves in the open sea looking for an enemy who could steam at the speed of sixteen to eighteen knots while we could barely maintain seven. The prospect of catching him was not very bright. However, we were doing our best with the tools the Government had given us to work with ..."

After "many vexatious delays", Evans writes, the American ships arrived off their destination, San Juan, Puerto Rico, on the afternoon of the 11th.

On the morning of 12 May, Amphitrite was assigned to the 1st Division, and steamed sixth in column as Sampson's ships stood toward San Juan. The admiral had seen that there were no Spanish ships in harbor—the object of his cruise—but decided to attack the defenses of the port, to "develop their defenses and strength" and then turn to the westward to continue the hunt. Beneath fair skies, the American ships stood through the long swells toward their objective.

Calling "all hands" at 04:00 to complete preparations for action, the ships went to general quarters an hour later. Iowa began the action at 05:16 with her forward 6-pounders. For two and a half hours, the ships bombarded the Spanish positions at San Juan. Amphitrite hurled 17 10-inch (254-mm) shells shoreward, as well as 30 4-inch (102-mm) shells, 30 3-pounders, and 22 6-pounders in the course of the action. The blast from the ship's 10-inch (254-mm) guns destroyed the gig and railings on the superstructure, and other items of minor damage which did not "destroy in any degree the efficiency of the vessel". The chronic irritation of the ship- poor ventilation -afflicted the ship in the course of the action, when a gunner's mate on duty in the after turret died from the heat. Amphitrite's Capt. Barclay commented on the lamentable conditions in his after-action report, pointing out that when the ship was closed up at action stations, the "utter lack of ventilation below ..." produced "heat so intense as to render it almost impossible for men stationed there to remain at their posts."

Toward the end of the action, Amphitrite lost the services of half of her main battery, when an armored hose on the exhaust pipe of the after turret burst, disabling it "at a moment when it could have rendered very efficient service." The monitor had sent the signal to the flagship that her after turret had been disabled, at 19:12; at 19:45, Iowa sounded "secure".

Sampson's fleet then formed column to the northwest and retired. Amphitrite returned to Key West, her base of operations, on 19 May, and remained there until the 24th. Over the next two and a half months, Amphitrite operated put of Key West on blockade duty, expanding her area of operations to include waters off Cap-Haïtien, Haiti, in late July, shortly before she was ordered to Cape San Juan, Puerto Rico on August 2, the designated landing site for the U.S. Army invasion of Puerto Rico.

Anchored behind a key just offshore and out of sight of the mainland since 1 August, on the evening of 6 August, Captain Barclay sent two boat parties ashore containing 28 sailors and 7 officers from Amphitrite under command of Lt. Charles N. Atwater and Passed Assistant Engineer David J. Jenkins, with orders to relight and occupy the Cape San Juan Light. They were also ordered to quarter 60 women and children of the town of Fajardo that were deemed in danger for having sided with the Americans.

Tragically, Cadet William H. Boardman was mortally wounded when his revolver dislodged from its faulty holster, fell to the marble floor and fired into his left inner thigh as he was entering the darkened lighthouse with three sailors. That night, Boardman was evacuated to Amphitrite, where he died two days later. Boardman was one of only 23 combat-related U.S. Navy deaths during the entire Spanish–American War and the only Navy death during Puerto Rican operations.

After learning of the American presence, on 4 August, Governor General Manuel Macías y Casado sent Colonel Pedro del Pino and about 220 troops, including civil guardsmen to recapture the town. When Colonel Pino entered Fajardo on the afternoon of 7 August, he found it nearly deserted because the residents, fearing a battle, had fled to the Fajardo Light and the surrounding hills. At close to midnight on 8 August, Pino's troops began their assault on the lighthouse. The landing party of Amphitrite's sailors occupying the lighthouse doused the light and signaled the ships offshore, initiating shore bombardment as the naval guns began firing a protective pattern. After two hours exchanging small arms and machine gun fire with the Americans in the lighthouse, the Spanish forces retreated back to Fajardo. The Americans suffered no casualties, despite a close call when a wayward naval shell smashed through the 2 ft (0.6 m) thick walls of the lighthouse within touch of six men but failed to explode. The Spanish losses were two dead and three wounded, including a lieutenant.

Early the next morning, Captain Barclay decided the continued occupation of the lighthouse was of marginal value and ordered his men back to the ship. A landing party of 30 sailors from Amphitrite and a similar number of U.S. Marines from the protected cruiser Cincinnati under Lieutenant John A. Lejeune came ashore to secure the area while the 60 Fajardan civilians boarded the armed tug Leyden for passage to Ponce. The bluejackets closed the lighthouse, left the U.S. flag flying and returned to the ship. In Fajardo, Pino's men tore down the U.S. flags that flew over the harbor Customs House and City Hall, returning to San Juan after verifying that the lighthouse was abandoned. The contingent of about 20 civil guards that had accompanied Pino, were left to maintain order in the town. The Battle of Fajardo was the only time that American forces withdrew from a position during the Puerto Rican Campaign.

Amphitrite departed Cape San Juan on 18 August for Guánica, Puerto Rico, arriving the following day, and lingered there until 31 August, on which day she sailed for St. Nicholas Mole, Haiti. Proceeding then to Hampton Roads, she arrived there on 20 September. Departing that port six days later on 26 September, Amphitrite moved up to Boston, Massachusetts, where she remained from 29 September 1898 – 25 February 1899.

=== Pre-World War I ===
==== Training ship ====
For the next few months, Amphitrite operated off the eastern seaboard of the United States, off Sandy Hook, out of Hampton Roads, and out of Port Royal before she returned to Hampton Roads from 21 to 30 May 1899 for gunnery instruction. She subsequently visited Philadelphia, Pennsylvania, Newport, Rhode Island, and New Bedford.

Owing to her light draft and steady platform, Amphitrite was deemed well adapted for gunnery work, and received on board two classes a year consisting of 60 men. From 1 July-4 October 1899, the monitor carried out gunnery instruction out of New Bedford, and on 12 October sailed for the New York Navy Yard for necessary repairs. Upon completion of this yard period, Amphitrite sailed for Port Royal on 3 December, stopping en route at Norfolk for coal and ammunition. Arriving at her destination on 9 December, she commenced her gunnery training course nine days later. On 17 January 1900, the tug Chickasaw was turned over to Amphitrite and fitted with a battery of one 6-pounder and one 1-pounder; for the remainder of the course, the tug proved a valuable adjunct to the monitor, serving as an "economical, handy, and effective moving platform" for moving subcaliber practice. Amphitrite completed her work at Port Royal on 19 April and proceeded north, accompanied by Chickasaw, stopping at Norfolk en route, and reached Tompkinsville on 9 May, proceeding thence to New Bedford, arriving there on 14 June. The tug Osceola subsequently replaced Chickasaw as Amphitrite's tender, joining the monitor off New Bedford on 25 June 1900.

Amphitrite carried out her gunnery training until departing New Bedford on 5 October for the Boston Navy Yard, where she underwent repairs from 7 October-14 November. Receiving drafts of men for gunnery class at Tompkinsville and Norfolk, the monitor proceeded back to Port Royal, arriving there on 29 November. Outside a brief port visit to Brunswick, Ga., from 28 January-6 February 1901, Amphitrite remained at Port Royal until 10 May, when she sailed for Norfolk and Tompkinsville, arriving at the latter on 3 June, en route back to her ultimate destination of New Bedford. Amphitrite continued the important work of training gun captains through the summer and into the fall. Deemed in need of a general overhaul, Amphitrite was placed out of commission at the Boston Navy Yard on 30 November 1901.

Recommissioned at Boston on 1 December 1902, Lt. Comdr. Edwin H. Tellman in command, Amphitrite was ordered to the Naval Training Station at Newport, for duty, on 10 January 1903. She served there until early in 1904, when she was sent to Guantanamo Bay Naval Base, Cuba, for duty as station ship. She performed this duty until detached on 19 June 1907, and was placed out of commission at League Island on 3 August 1907.

Placed in commission, in reserve, on 14 June 1910, Amphitrite was assigned to duty, training reservists in the Missouri Naval Militia, at St. Louis, Missouri, under the command of Chief Boatswain Patrick Shanahan, a duty she performed until assigned to training reservists at New Orleans, Louisiana, on 12 May 1912. Detached from this duty four years later, on 12 May 1916, the ship then proceeded to New Haven, Connecticut, for assignment with the naval militia of the state of Connecticut.

=== World War I ===
Amphitrite cleared Bridgeport, Connecticut, on 2 February 1917 for repairs and alterations at the New York Navy Yard, arriving the following day, 2 February. On 17 February, the ship departed the yard and stood down river to the Narrows, near Rosebank, Staten Island, for work on the submarine net in company with three tugs, Hudson, W. J. Conway, and Lizzie D., and Navy lighters Victor, Transport, and the tug S. W. Holbrook. Later, in company with M. M. Millard, George T. Kirkham, and John Nichols, she continued her work laying the net off Rosebank.

After further repairs at the Navy Yard from 2–17 March Amphitrite resumed duty with the Naval Militia of Connecticut, arriving at New Haven on 18 March. She carried out this training duty, with drafts of men from Yale and Harvard for instruction in ordnance, signaling, and seamanship, into early April. With the entry of the U.S. into World War I at that time, Amphitrite departed New Haven on 7 April for the New York Navy Yard and repairs and alterations. She returned to Rosebank to guard the nets on 15 April. She was assigned to the 3d Naval District on 27 April 1917.

Assigned the duty of examining all ships entering or leaving New York Harbor (except Army or Navy ships which identified themselves by exchange of signals), Amphitrite also received all reports of submarine activity with the waters off the district. At night, she trained her searchlights on the nets at regular intervals or to allow passage of authorized vessels. Such duty was not without hazard.

At 19:16 on 13 June 1917, the steamship Manchuria was standing out of New York Harbor in a thick fog and collided with Amphitrite, suffering damage below the waterline. Attempting to clear, Manchuria scraped the guardship's bow, and her propeller strut fouled her cable, holding her fast for 20 minutes. Manchuria lowered her boats and abandoned ship; two section patrol boats and a motor sailer stood by and took lifeboats in tow. Ultimately, Manchuria was towed and beached off Tompkinsville, while Amphitrite continued her net-tending duties.

On 26 October, the guardship proceeded to the New York Navy Yard for repairs, remaining there until 20 November, when she returned to her station at Rosebank. She was carrying out her duties there when, on 14 December 1917, the British steamship British Isles collided with her during a heavy snow squall, doing not only considerable damage to Amphitrite but to the torpedo nets at the Narrows as well.

Following repairs, Amphitrite remained on duty at Rosebank, interspersing guardship duties with upkeep and repairs at the New York Navy Yard, into October 1918. Leaving New York on 24 October for Hampton Roads, Amphitrite carried out standardization runs and target practice at Tangier Sound in late October and the first week of November; on 8 November, she left Tangier Sound, via Hampton Roads, for Rosebank. She arrived back at Staten Island on 11 November 1918, the day the war ended in Europe with the armistice. Ultimately, Amphitrite left New York for Philadelphia on 30 April 1919, arriving on 1 May.

On 30 December 1918, USS Knickerbocker (SP-479) was assigned as tender to Amphitrite and served as a dispatch ship.

Amphitrite was decommissioned at the Philadelphia Navy Yard on 31 May 1919 and stricken from the Navy List on 24 July 1919. On 3 January 1920, she was sold to A. L. D. Bucksten of Elizabeth City, North Carolina.

=== Post-war commercial service ===
Stripped of her turrets and superstructure, the ship was towed to Beaufort, South Carolina, where she was used as a floating hotel. She was subsequently towed to Florida for the same purpose, and it was rumored that "a certain amount of fashionable gambling was carried out on board." Notorious gangster Al Capone was rumored to have been interested in the erstwhile warship.

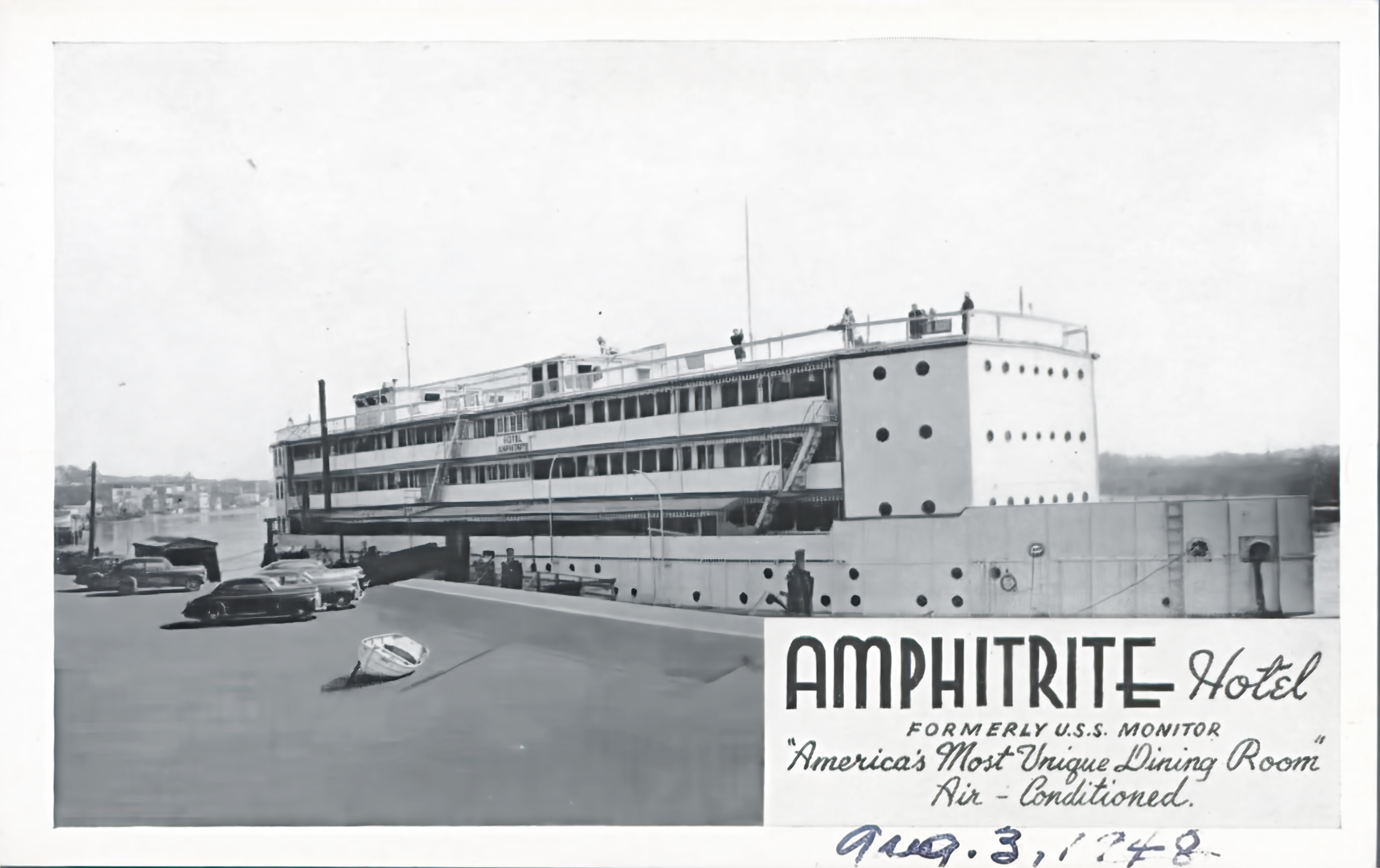
Amphitrite after conversion to a hotel.

Chartered by the government in 1943, the ship was towed via inland waters to Elizabeth City, where she provided housing facilities for the workers building a new naval air station there. Following World War II, she lay alongside a wharf at Georgetown, South Carolina, whence she was towed to Baltimore, Maryland, in the spring of 1950. She was placed into a slip dredged into the bank at Sandy Point, near where the new Chesapeake Bay Bridge was to be built, but business for a floating restaurant and hotel proved slow and she was sold again in the spring of 1951, and was taken to Baltimore. Plans to refit the ship for work supporting oil exploration in the Venezuelan oil fields came to naught, and the ship was sold to the Patapsco Steel Corp., Fairfield, Maryland. By the spring of 1952, the scrapping had been completed.

== Bibliography ==
- Grobmeier, Alvin H. (1990). "Question 2/89". Warship International. XXVII (2): 198–199. ISSN 0043-0374.
