= USS Terror (BM-4) =

Monitor of the United States Navy

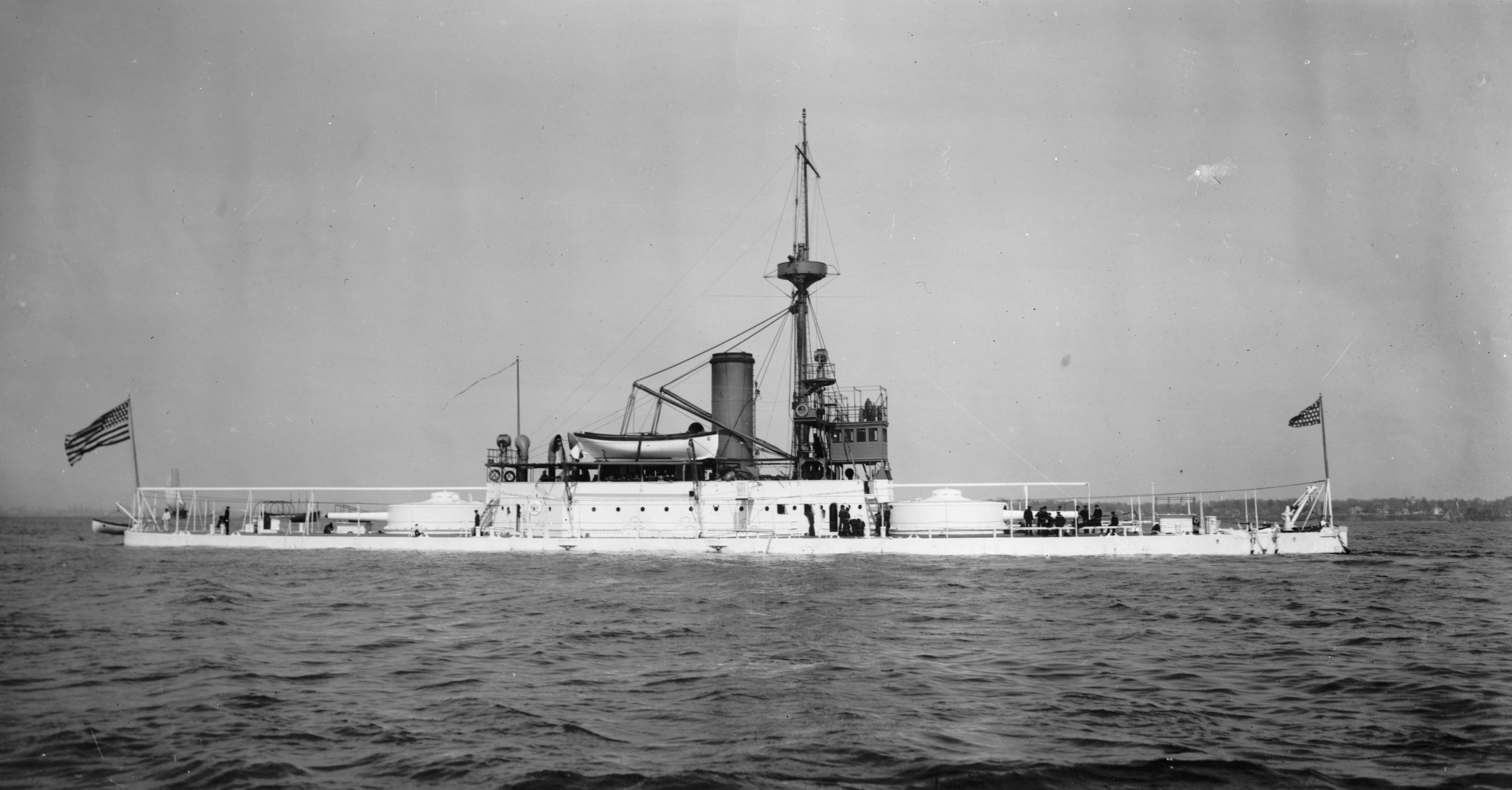
- USS Terror

History

United States
- Name: USS Terror
- Ordered: 23 June 1874
- Builder: William Cramp & Sons, Philadelphia
- Yard number: 195
- Laid down: 1874
- Launched: 24 March 1883
- Commissioned: 15 April 1896
- Decommissioned: 8 May 1906
- Stricken: 31 December 1915
- Fate: Presumed scrapped, 1930s

General characteristics
- Type: Amphitrite class monitor
- Displacement: 3,990 long tons (4,054 t)
- Length: 263 ft 1 in (80.19 m)
- Beam: 55 ft 6 in (16.92 m)
- Draft: 14 ft 8 in (4.47 m)
- Propulsion: Steam engine
- Speed: 12 knots (22 km/h; 14 mph)
- Complement: 150 officers and enlisted
- Armament: 4 × 10 in (254 mm)/caliber breechloader rifles; 2 × 4 in (100 mm) rifles; 2 × 3-pounder guns

USS Terror (Monitor No. 4)—the totally rebuilt version of the earlier monitor Agamenticus, which had shared the Terror's name—was an iron-hulled, twin-screw, double-turreted monitor of the Amphitrite class; on June 23, 1874 by order of President Ulysses S. Grant's Secretary of Navy George M. Robeson in response to the Virginius Incident laid down (scrapped and rebuilt) at Philadelphia contracted by William Cramp & Sons. Her construction progressed over the next three years until suspended in 1877. Work was resumed six years later, and the monitor was launched on 24 March 1883.

Delivered to the Navy in 1887, the still-unfinished warship was taken to the New York Navy Yard for completion. Over the next seven years, she fitted out at a leisurely pace. Terror was finally commissioned at New York City on 15 April 1896.

== Service history ==
=== Spanish–American War ===
Assigned to the North Atlantic Squadron, Terror operated off the east coast of the United States, from Tompkinsville, New York, to Hampton Roads and Fort Monroe, Virginia; and from Sandy Hook, New Jersey to Charleston, South Carolina, through the winter of 1897 and 1898. On 5 May 1897 she collided with steam yacht "Penelope" off Hoffman Island, New York doing $500 in damage to the Yacht. The mysterious explosion which wrecked the armored cruiser Maine at Havana Harbor on 15 February 1898 materially increased tensions between the United States and Spain. Terror sped south from Tompkinsville to join the fleet concentrating in southern waters and arrived at Key West on 2 April 1898.

On 22 April, after receiving orders from President William McKinley, Rear Admiral William T. Sampson, commanding the North Atlantic Squadron from New York (Armored Cruiser No. 2), deployed his fleet in preparation for a blockade of the Cuban coast. Three days later, the United States declared war on Spain, beginning the Spanish–American War. Terror, which had arrived off Cardenas, Cuba, on the 24th, captured a Cuban vessel—Almansas—on the first day of hostilities, but later released her. Over the next two days, the monitor took two Spanish ships, Ambrosia Bolivar and Guido, and sent the prizes to Florida.

Meanwhile, the whereabouts of the Spanish Navy's Caribbean Squadron under Admiral Pascual Cervera prompted concern in naval circles in Washington. Intelligence estimates which reached Sampson noted that the Spanish fleet had departed the Cape Verde Islands on the morning of 29 April. Sampson reacted by deciding to meet Cervera's fleet at San Juan, Puerto Rico, the nearest Spanish base in the West Indies. With his flag in New York, Rear Admiral Sampson scraped together a makeshift squadron—which included Terror and a sistership, Amphitrite (Monitor No. 2), as well as battleships Iowa (Battleship No. 4) and Indiana (Battleship No. 1), Porter (Torpedo Boat No. 6), two auxiliaries and a collier—and departed Key West on 3 May.

Terror and Amphitrite broke down frequently en route and materially delayed Sampson's passage. At one point, New York took both Terror and Porter in tow. Upon arrival off San Juan on 12 May, the Americans found only a couple of minor Spanish gunboats in the harbor. In order to "develop their positions and strength", Sampson decided to conduct a brief bombardment of the shore defenses. The squadron stood in for their target at 04:00, on 12 May 1898, with the ships cleared for action and the lights of the town clearly visible in the predawn darkness. Sounding general quarters at 05:00, the Americans opened fire within 15 minutes, and the Spanish began returning fire at 05:23.

Terror stood in, fifth in column, duelling with the Spanish shore batteries in a spirited engagement for the next three hours. As the action wore on, a tremendous volume of white smoke restricted visibility and caused the Admiral to signal "use large guns only" to cut down on the volume of smoke.

Terror expended thirty-one 10-inch shells in three firing passes against the fortifications at San Juan, and scored a direct hit on a battery which the monitor's commanding officer, Capt. Nicholl Ludlow, considered "the most vicious". Terror, which had moved close inshore to gain a better firing position, kept up a spirited fire until 08:15, when she broke off action and rejoined Sampson's squadron retiring to the northwest.

The monitor subsequently resumed her cruising operations in the West Indies and off Puerto Rico for the duration of hostilities with Spain, into September 1898. At the conclusion of the war, Terror sailed north for Hampton Roads. Placed in reserve at Norfolk on 18 October 1898, the monitor was decommissioned and placed in ordinary on 25 February 1899.

=== Later career ===
Taken to Annapolis, Maryland, late in 1901, Terror was recommissioned for service at the Naval Academy and subsequently served as a practice ship for midshipmen. She conducted a summer midshipman cruise in 1905. Later taken up to Philadelphia, Terror was placed in reserve on 11 September 1905 and was decommissioned and laid up at League Island on 8 May 1906. Struck from the Navy list on 31 December 1915, Terror lay at Indian Head, Maryland as a test hulk at the Naval Proving Grounds, before being placed on the sale list in June 1920. Although sold for scrap iron on 10 March 1921, Terror sank off Shooters Island, New York, sometime in the 1920s. Records indicate that the hulk was raised by the Sorenson Wrecking Company in early 1930, while operating under contract with the Navy. This hulk was presumably scrapped soon thereafter.
