= Thomas F. Rowland =

American engineer and shipbuilder

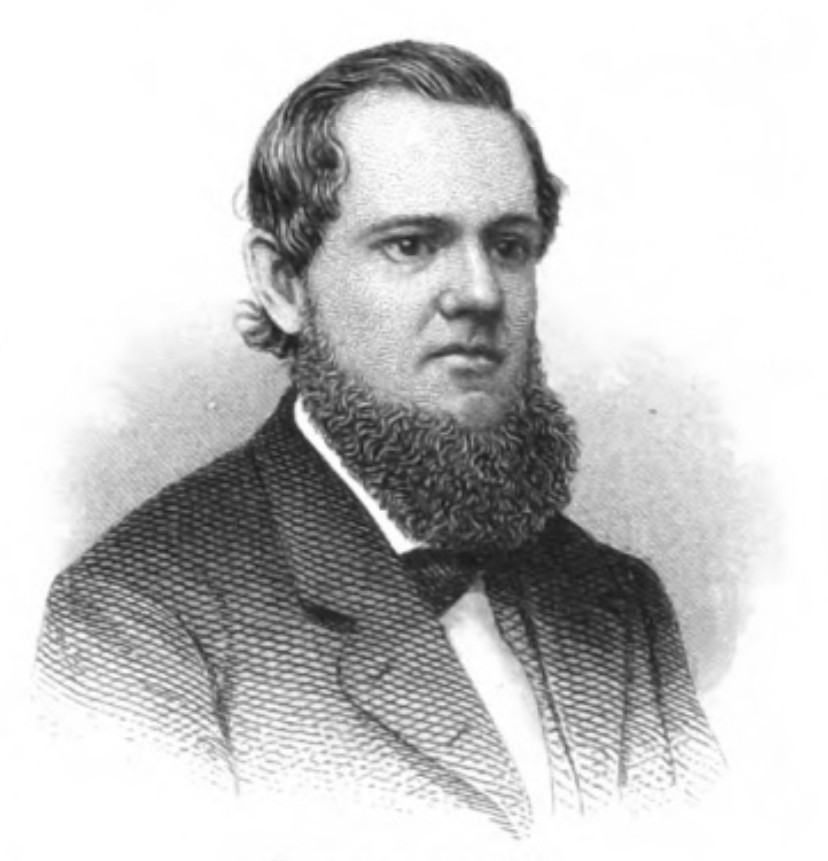
- Rowland, c. 1868
- Born: Thomas F. Rowland; March 15, 1831; New Haven, Connecticut, US
- Died: December 13, 1907 (aged 76); New York City, US
- Occupations: Engineer, shipbuilder
- Years active: 1844–1907
- Known for: Founded the Continental Iron Works; Built the innovative warship USS Monitor and other ironclads during the American Civil War

Thomas Fitch Rowland (March 15, 1831 – December 13, 1907) was an American engineer and shipbuilder. In 1861, he founded the Continental Iron Works in Greenpoint, Brooklyn, which built ironclad warships for the United States Navy during the American Civil War, most notably USS Monitor, which successfully neutralized the threat from the Confederate ironclad CSS Virginia in the Battle of Hampton Roads in 1862.

After the war, Rowland's Continental Works diversified into the construction of gasworks and other industrial fittings, and became a pioneer of welding technology, producing welded, corrugated boiler furnaces and other welded products. During the Spanish–American War and World War I, the company produced munitions. After World War I, it focused increasingly on the manufacture of gas mains and large-diameter water pipes. The plant closed in 1928, with the retirement of Rowland's eldest son from the business.

Rowland was described as an energetic and inventive leader, who designed many of his own company's machine tools, accumulating more than fifty patents in the course of his lifetime. He also had an interest in philanthropy, and is credited among other things with having pioneered the Saturday half-day holiday in New York for employees. In 1884, he endowed the Thomas Fitch Rowland Prize for outstanding engineering papers, which is still awarded annually as of 2020.

== Life and career ==
=== Early life and career ===
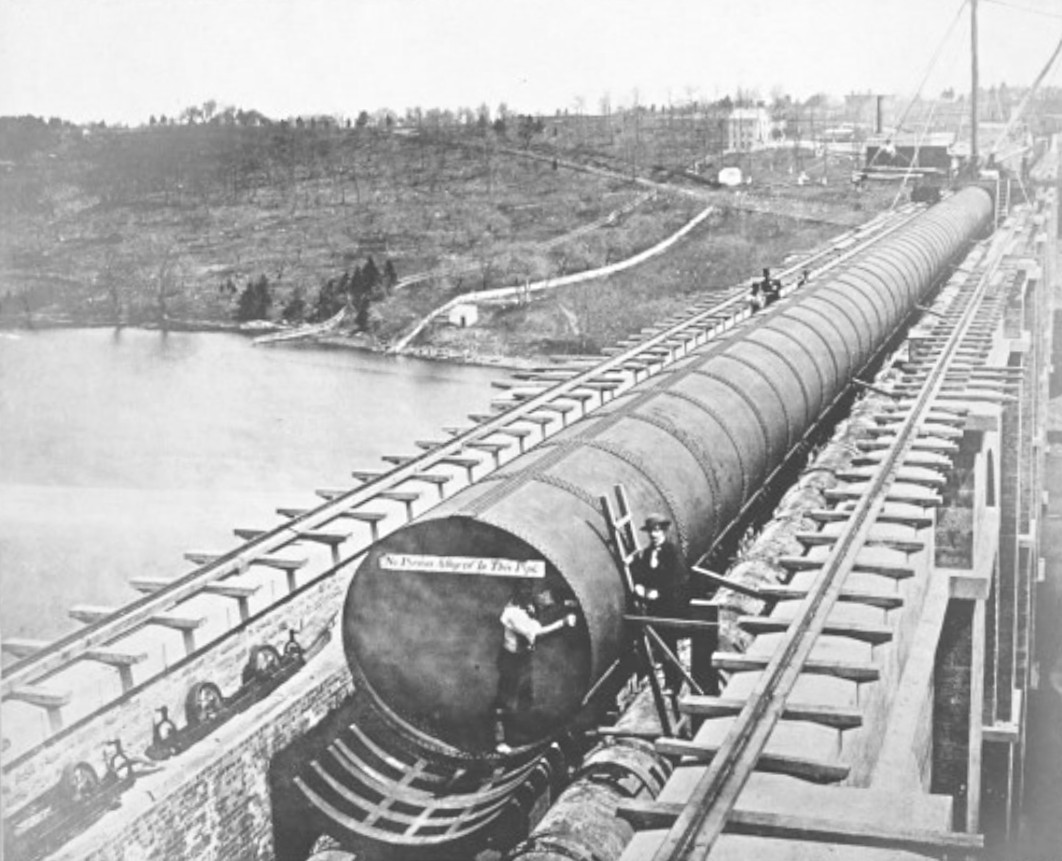
Erecting the water pipeline across the Harlem River, ca. 1861, one of the first large contracts undertaken by the Continental Works

Thomas Fitch Rowland was born in New Haven, Connecticut, on March 15, 1831, the fourth of five children and only son of George and Ruth Caroline (née Attwater) Rowland. His mother died when he was six years old. Rowland was a descendant of Henry M. Rowland of Essex, England, an early settler of Fairfield, Connecticut, and of Thomas Fitch (1699–1774), one of the last colonial governors of the state, whose house was burned down by the British during the American Revolutionary War.

Rowland received a common school education at Lovel's School and the Collegiate Preparatory School in New Haven. At the age of 13, he became the miller's boy in his father's grist mill. He eventually joined the New York and New Haven Railroad, (Note: While a number of sources state that Rowland joined the New York, New Haven and Hartford Railroad after leaving his father's employ, that railroad did not actually exist as such until formed by the amalgamation of various railroads in 1872. According to Rowland's obituary in the New-York Daily Tribune, his initial employment in the rail sector was with the "New Haven & Farmington Railroad", presumably a reference to the New Haven and Northampton Company, that operated a railroad along the route of the Farmington Canal (also known as the New Haven and Northampton Canal) between New Haven and Northampton, Massachusetts, via Farmington in the 1840s. The Farmington rail line was leased by the New York and New Haven Railroad from 1848, the latter company becoming one of those that were subsequently merged into the New York, New Haven and Hartford Railroad.) reportedly as its first apprentice, later serving with the company as a fireman and engineer; he is said to have "fired the third passenger train that was sent over the road from New Haven to New York".

In 1850, he took a position as 2nd assistant engineer on Connecticut, a leading steamboat operating between New Haven and New York. Discharged from this position following a change of ownership of the steamboat line, Rowland joined the Allaire Iron Works in 1852, where he worked as a draftsman. During his time with this company, he designed the engines of the steam revenue cutter USRC Harriet Lane. According to some sources, he then became general superintendent of the steam engineering works of Henry Esler & Co., (Note: The source refers to the "Atlantic Dock Iron Company", a slightly misnamed reference to the Atlantic Dock Iron Works, the name of Esler & Co.'s plant.) but another account states that he joined the Morgan Iron Works.

=== Continental Iron Works ===
In 1859, Samuel Sneden, a builder of wood-hulled steamboats in Greenpoint, Brooklyn, was offered a contract by a regular customer to build an iron-hulled ship. With no experience in the construction of such vessels, Sneden invited Rowland into partnership in his firm, Samuel Sneden & Co., to assist the yard in making the transition to iron shipbuilding. Rowland accepted, and over the following two years, three iron-hulled vessels were produced by the partnership. In January 1861, however, Sneden & Co. abruptly failed after submitting a low bid for the construction of a large-diameter water mains across the Harlem River. Shortly after, Sneden ceded his yard to Rowland, who pledged to settle the failed company's affairs. Rowland renamed the yard the Continental Iron Works, and the water mains contract would later be completed by the new firm.

==== American Civil War ====
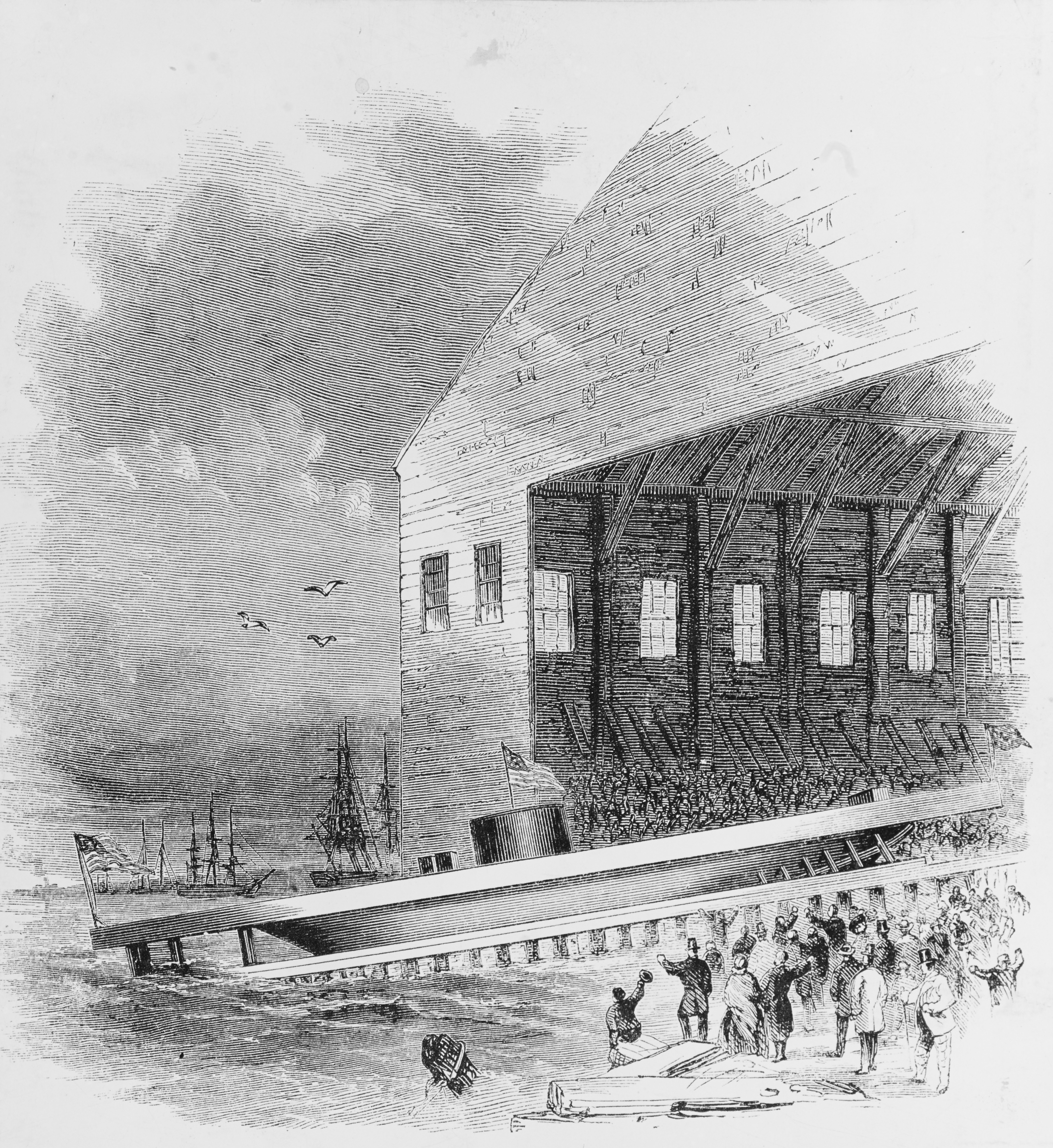
Launch of USS Monitor at the Continental Iron Works, January 30, 1862

The establishment of the Continental Works coincided with the outbreak of the American Civil War in April 1861, and later that year, Rowland became associated with New York engineer John Ericsson, who had just secured a contract with the United States Navy for the construction of a radically new type of ironclad warship with low freeboard and a revolving gun turret. Ericsson subcontracted Rowland for construction of the hull, and the new warship—later commissioned as USS Monitor—was launched at the Continental Works in just 101 days. When Monitor successfully neutralized the threat from the Confederate ironclad CSS Virginia at the Battle of Hampton Roads in 1862, a "monitor craze" took hold in Washington, with contracts for many more such warships being issued to firms around the nation. The Continental Iron Works would ultimately build seven monitors for the Navy during the war—more than any other company in the country. The Works also built the turrets for an additional three monitors as well as building an iron-hulled gunboat and doing other wartime work for the government. At one point in 1864, Rowland attempted to sell the Continental Works and go into early retirement, but this did not eventuate, and instead he would remain the company's president for most of his life.

During the war, Rowland was widely praised for his energetic and creative leadership. He patented a number of machine tools in this period, including one that reportedly saved the labor of 75 men. A "prolific" inventor, Rowland would file more than fifty patents over the course of his lifetime.

==== Postwar activities ====
After the Civil War, a severe and prolonged shipbuilding slump devastated New York's shipbuilding industry, and although the Continental Iron Works continued to build the occasional ship, it diversified into other areas, notably the supply of equipment for the burgeoning gas lighting industry, including the manufacture of gas holders, gas mains and entire gasworks. The company also manufactured its own line of boilers, and became a pioneer in welding technology, producing welded boiler furnaces, gas-illuminated buoys, steel digesters for the wood-pulping industry, and other products. From time to time it also manufactured munitions, notably welded torpedo casings, and depth charge casings during World War I. After this war, the company increasingly focused on the manufacture of gas mains and large welded water pipes. The company was liquidated in 1928, following the retirement of Rowland's son.

=== Personal details ===
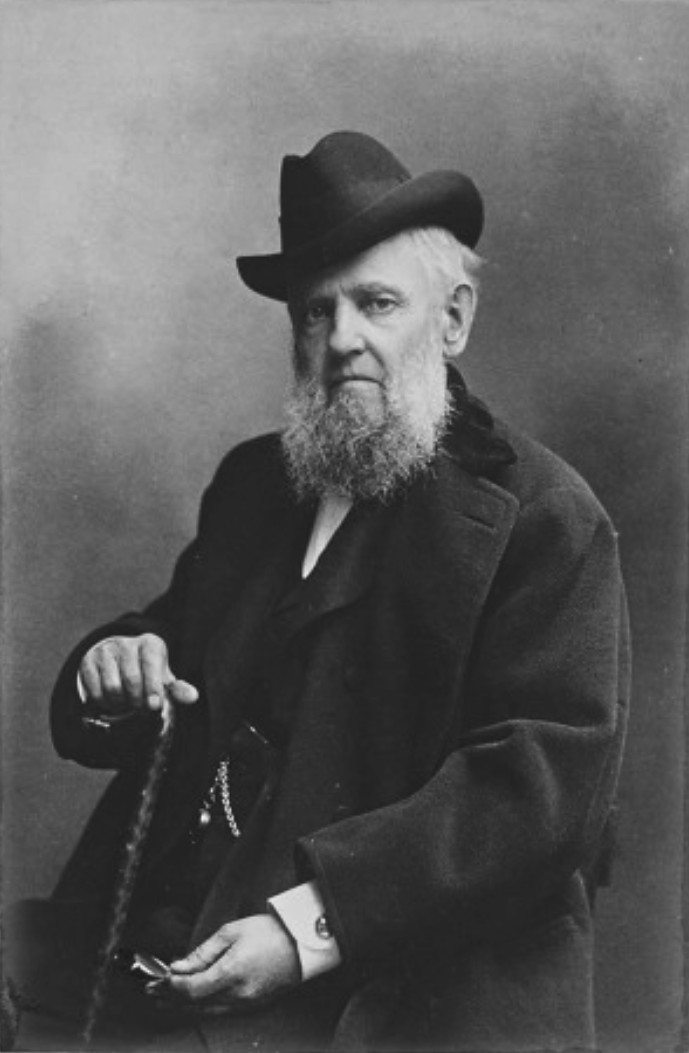
Rowland, ca. 1903

In 1855, Thomas F. Rowland married Mary Eliza Bradley, daughter of Charles Bradley of New Haven, Connecticut. The Rowlands had four children: a daughter, Caroline Attwater, who died in infancy, and three sons, Thomas Jr., Charles and George, the first two of whom mentioned following their father into the family business.

Rowland was known for his genial disposition, and was said to be "universally esteemed" during his life; he was further described as a "leading and progressive spirit in the life of the Greenpoint community." He was active as a philanthropist, notably pioneering the practice in New York of granting a half-day holiday to employees on Saturday afternoons, which he extended to his own workforce with no reduction in pay. He also gave generous Christmas bonuses to his employees, ranging from $25 (equivalent to $896 in 2025) to $75 (equivalent to $2,687 in 2025) depending on their length of employment. After the Ascension Episcopal Church in Kent Street, Brooklyn, was completed in 1885, Rowland paid the Church's outstanding debt of $15,000 (equivalent to $537,500 in 2025). On another occasion, when the rector of the Church—whom Rowland had at the time known for only a few months—suffered a prolonged illness, Rowland paid his accumulated medical bills.

Rowland was a vice-president and life member of the American Society of Mechanical Engineers, and was one of only nine honorary members in his time of the American Society of Civil Engineers. To the latter organization he endowed an annual prize for exceptional engineering papers, known as the Thomas Fitch Rowland Prize, which is still awarded today. He was a life member of the Society of Naval Architects and Marine Engineers, the New York Chamber of Commerce, the American Geographical Society, American Gas Light Association, New Haven Colony Historical Society, Fairfield County Historical Society and New England Society, and an honorary member of the Society of Gas Lighting, Union League Club and American Yacht Club. He was also a trustee of the Webb Academy and Home for Shipbuilders, the General Society of Mechanics and Tradesmen and the New York Historical Society.

Rowland struggled with illness in his declining years. He died on December 13, 1907, having only stepped back from the presidency of the Continental Works a few months prior. He was survived by his wife Mary, and by two of his sons, Thomas Jr. and Charles. His remains were interred in the family plot in Evergreen Cemetery, in his birthplace of New Haven, Connecticut.
