= Cohoes =

Cohoes may refer to:

- Cohoes, New York, a city in Albany County, New York, United States
- Cohoes Fashions, an American clothing store
- USS Cohoes, a list of ships

== See also ==
- Cohoe, Alaska, United States
