= USS Cushing =

USS Cushing may refer to one of several United States Navy ships named in honor of William B. Cushing:

- USS Cushing (TB-1), a torpedo boat (the first) commissioned in 1890, and served until her decommissioning in 1898
- USS Cushing (DD-55), an O'Brien-class destroyer commissioned 1915 and decommissioned in 1920
- USS Cushing (DD-376), a Mahan-class destroyer, commissioned in 1936, sunk during the Naval Battle of Guadalcanal in November 1942
- USS Cushing (DD-797), a Fletcher-class destroyer, commissioned in 1944, and decommissioned in 1960
- USS Cushing (DD-985), a Spruance-class destroyer, commissioned in 1978 and deactivated in 2005
