= USS Puritan (1864) =

American Ironclad monitors

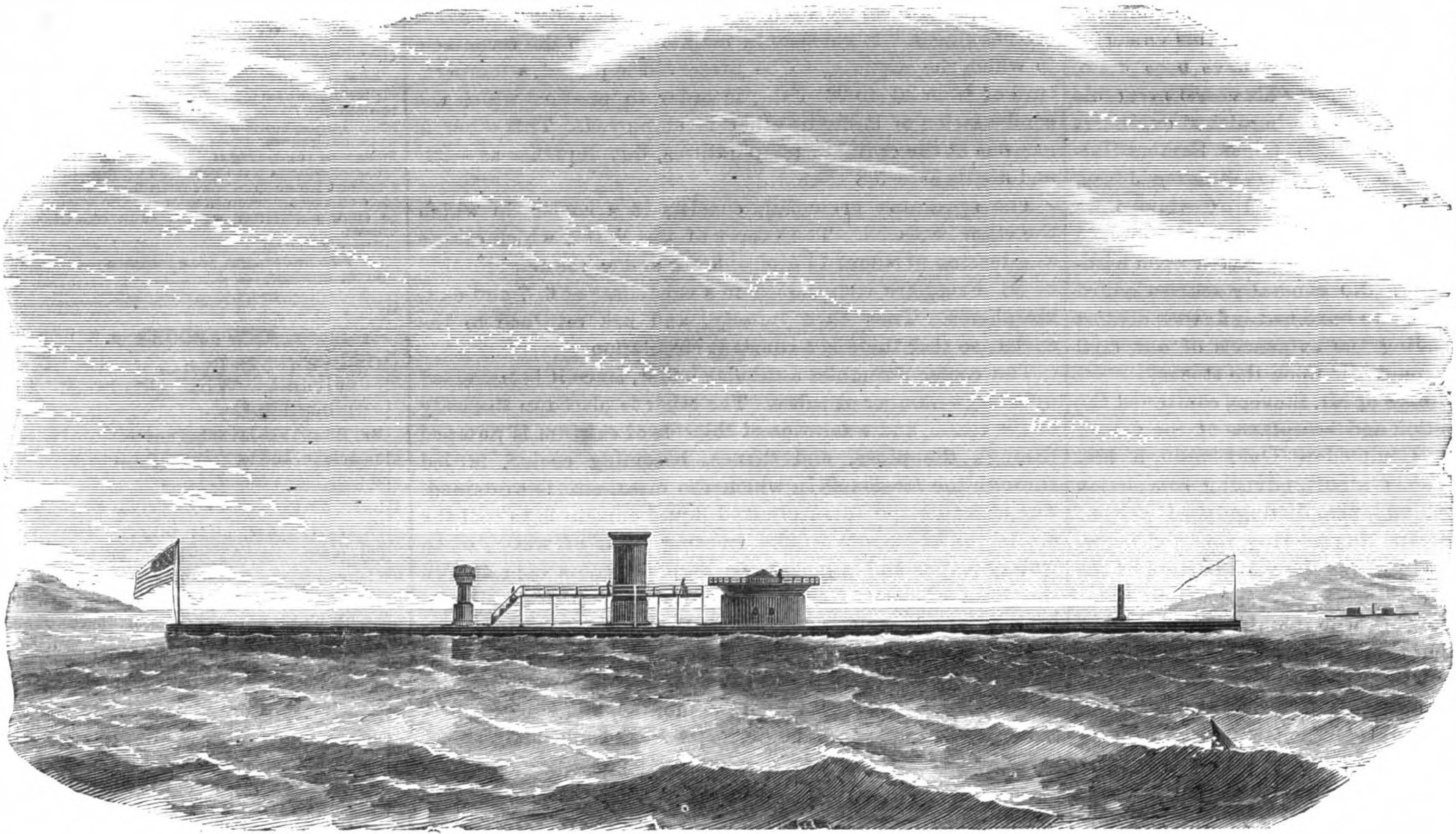
- A speculative line engraving of Puritan had she been completed

History

United States
- Name: Puritan
- Namesake: Puritan
- Ordered: 28 July 1862
- Builder: Continental Iron Works, Greenpoint, Brooklyn
- Laid down: 1863
- Launched: 2 July 1864
- Commissioned: Never
- Fate: Scrapped, 1874

General characteristics
- Type: Ocean-going monitor
- Displacement: 4,912 long tons (4,991 t)
- Tons burthen: 3,265 tons (bm)
- Length: 340 ft (103.6 m) (o/a)
- Beam: 50 ft (15.2 m)
- Draft: 20 ft (6.1 m)
- Installed power: 6 × water-tube boilers
- Propulsion: 2 × propellers; 1 × vibrating-lever steam engine
- Speed: 15 knots (28 km/h; 17 mph)
- Armament: 2 × 20 in (508 mm) smoothbore Dahlgren guns
- Armor: Gun turret: 15 in (381 mm); Waterline belt: 6 in (152 mm); Pilot house: 12 in (305 mm)

USS Puritan was one of two ocean-going ironclad monitors designed by John Ericsson during the American Civil War of 1861–1865. Launched in mid-1864, construction was suspended sometime in 1865. The Navy Department had specified two twin-gun turrets over Ericsson's protests, but finally agreed to delete the second turret in late 1865. The Navy Department evaded the Congressional refusal to order new ships in 1874 by claiming that the Civil War-era ship was being repaired while building a new monitor of the same name.

== Description ==
Puritan was 340 feet (103.6 m) long overall, had a beam of 50 feet (15.2 m) and had a draft of 20 feet (6.1 m). The ship had a tonnage of 3,265 tons burthen and displaced 4,912 long tons (4,991 t). She was powered by a two-cylinder vibrating-lever steam engine with a bore of 100 in (2.5 m) and a stroke of 48 in (1.2 m). The engine drove two propeller shafts using steam provided by six Martin water-tube boilers and the designed speed was 15 knots (28 km/h; 17 mph). Puritan was designed to carry a maximum of 1,000 long tons (1,016 t) of coal.

The monitor was originally intended to mount two twin-gun turrets, but Ericsson persuaded the Navy Department to switch to a single turret armed with a pair of 20-inch (508 mm) smoothbore, muzzle-loading, Dahlgren guns. None of the guns were completed before the end of the war. Puritan's armor scheme was identical to that of Dictator, the other ocean-going monitor ordered at the same time. Her hull was protected by six layers of 1-inch (25 mm) wrought-iron plates and her ship's deck armor was 1.5 in (38 mm) thick. The armor of the gun turret had a total thickness of 15 in (381 mm) and consisted of six outer layers, blocks of 4.5-inch (114 mm) segmented armor slabs in the middle and then four more layers. The pilot house armor was 12 in (305 mm) in thickness.

== Construction ==
Buoyed by the victory gained by Ericsson's Monitor during the Battle of Hampton Roads in early March 1862, the Navy Department decided later that month to build several ocean-going monitors in case the British or the French decided to intervene in the war. Ericsson submitted preliminary designs in May and Secretary of the Navy Gideon Welles authorized two ships, one with a single turret (Dictator) and a larger one with two turrets the following month. On 28 July the Navy Department awarded Ericsson with a contract for Puritan, having changed the name of the ship from Ericsson's submission of Protector. He subcontracted the hull of the Puritan to the Continental Iron Works of Greenpoint, Brooklyn, and the propulsion machinery to the Allaire Iron Works of New York City. The ship was laid down in 1863 and was launched on 2 July 1864. However, due to delays in building and the casting of the 20-inch smoothbores, her construction was suspended in 1865 and she was never completed.

After the war, Puritan deteriorated on the stocks and she was sold to John Roach in 1874. Although Congress was informed by the Navy Department that the Civil War-era ship was being repaired, a new iron-hulled monitor of the same name was built with repair money and the proceeds of her sale because Congress refused to fund any new construction at this time.
