= USS Cushing (DD-985) =

Spruance-class destroyer

Coordinates: 23.745126°N 160.334473°W

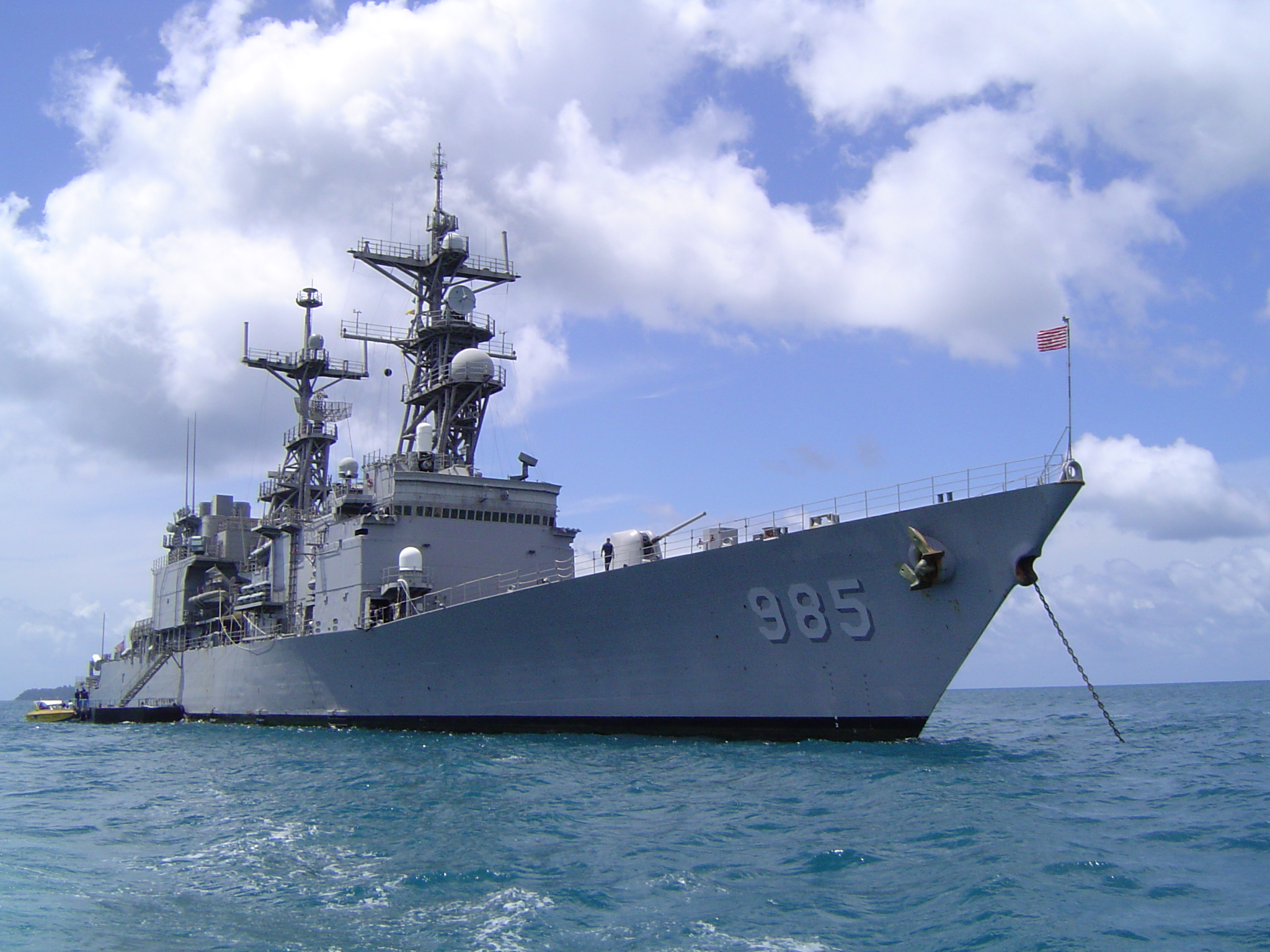
- USS Cushing anchored off Phuket Island in August 2004

History

United States
- Name: Cushing
- Namesake: William B. Cushing
- Ordered: 15 January 1974
- Builder: Ingalls Shipbuilding
- Laid down: 2 February 1977
- Launched: 17 June 1978
- Acquired: 4 September 1979
- Commissioned: 21 September 1979
- Decommissioned: 21 September 2005
- Stricken: 21 September 2005
- Identification: Callsign: NPGC; Hull number: DD-985
- Motto: Non Sibi Sed Patriae; 'Not for self but for country'
- Nickname(s): Golden Lion
- Fate: Sunk as target, 14 July 2008
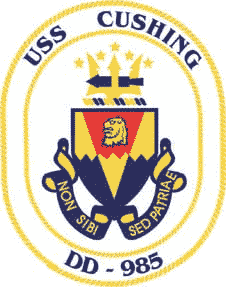
- Badge

General characteristics
- Class & type: Spruance-class destroyer
- Displacement: 8,040 long tons (8,170 t) full load
- Length: 529 ft (161 m) waterline; 563 ft (172 m) overall
- Beam: 55 ft (17 m)
- Draft: 29 ft (8.8 m)
- Installed power: 3 × 501-K17 generator sets (2,000 kW (2,700 hp) each)
- Propulsion: 4 × General Electric LM2500 gas turbines, 2 shafts, 80,000 shp (60 MW)
- Speed: 32.5 knots (60.2 km/h; 37.4 mph)
- Range: 6,000 nmi (11,000 km; 6,900 mi) at 20 knots (37 km/h; 23 mph)
- Complement: 19 officers, 315 enlisted
- Sensors & processing systems: AN/SPS-40 air search radar; AN/SPG-60 fire control radar; AN/SPS-55 surface search radar; AN/SPQ-9 gun fire control radar; Mark 23 TAS automatic detection and tracking radar; AN/SPS-65 missile fire control radar; AN/SQS-53 bow-mounted active sonar; AN/SQR-19 TACTAS towed array passive sonar; Naval Tactical Data System
- Electronic warfare & decoys: AN/SLQ-32 electronic warfare system; AN/SLQ-25 Nixie torpedo countermeasures; Mark 36 SRBOC decoy launching system; AN/SLQ-49 inflatable decoys
- Armament: 2 × 5 in (127 mm) 54 caliber Mark 45 dual purpose guns; 2 × 20 mm Phalanx CIWS Mark 15 guns; 1 × 8 cell ASROC launcher (removed); 1 × 8 cell NATO Sea Sparrow Mark 29 missile launcher; 2 × quadruple Harpoon missile canisters; 2 × Mark 32 triple 12.75 in (324 mm) torpedo tubes (Mk 46 torpedoes); 1 × 61 cell Mk 41 VLS launcher for Tomahawk missiles; 1 × 21 cell RIM-116 Rolling Airframe Missile launcher
- Aircraft carried: 2 × Sikorsky SH-60 Seahawk LAMPS III helicopters
- Aviation facilities: Flight deck and enclosed hangar for up to two medium-lift helicopters

USS Cushing (DD-985), named after Commander William Barker Cushing, was the fifth ship of the United States Navy to bear the name. Cushing was a Spruance-class destroyer built by the Ingalls Shipbuilding Division of Litton Industries at Pascagoula, Mississippi. Cushing operated out of Yokosuka, Japan for the last several years of her career. Cushing was the last Spruance-class destroyer to remain in active service, until decommissioned on 21 September 2005.

== History ==
Cushing was laid down 27 December 1976 by Ingalls Shipbuilding in Pascagoula, Mississippi. She was launched on 17 June 1978 and commissioned on 21 September 1979. Cushing was the last U.S. warship to transit the Panama Canal prior to control of the canal being handed over to Panama in 1979.

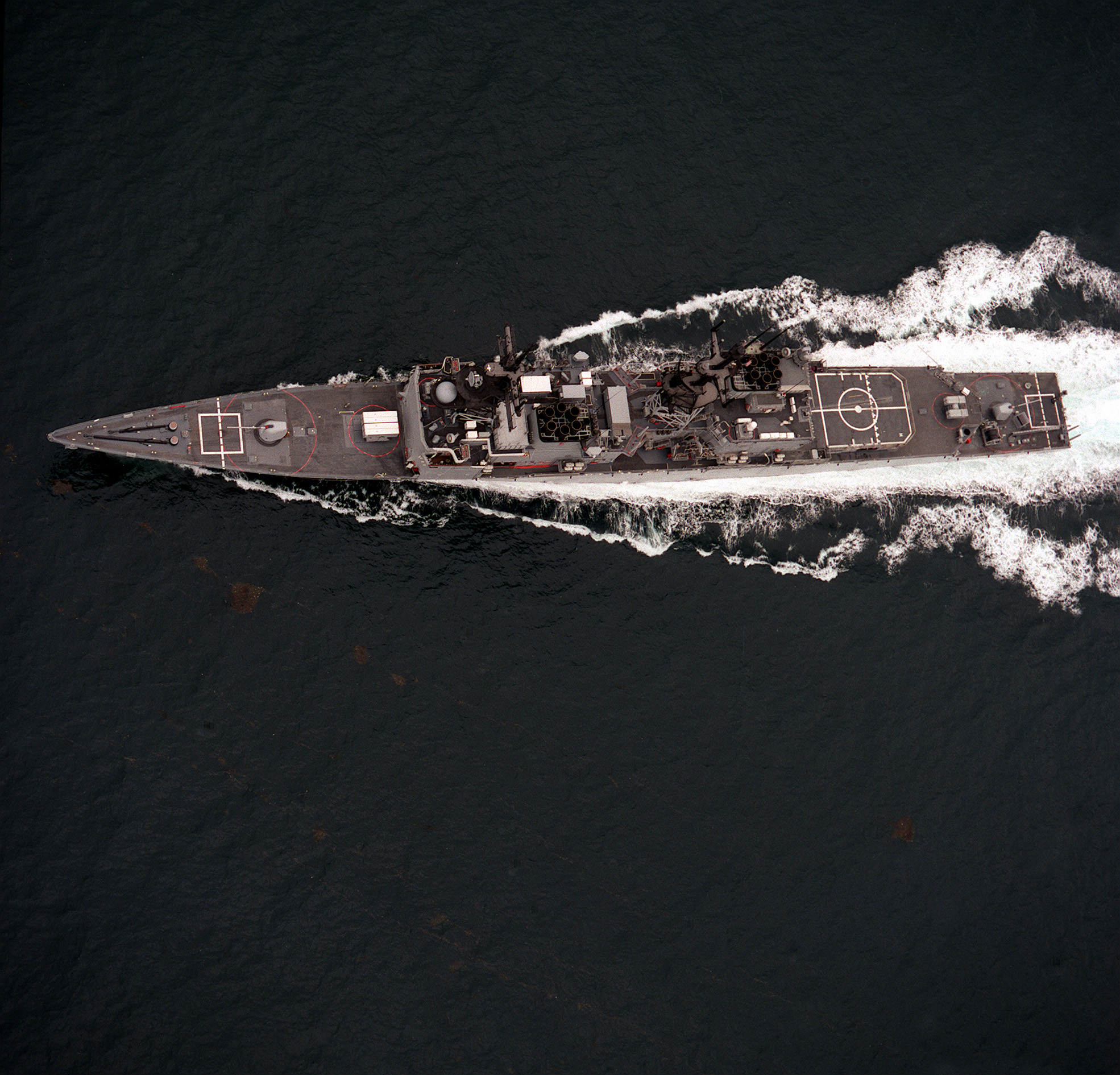
USS Cushing on 1 January 1987

Prior to its formal commissioning, Cushing departed her builders in Mississippi in order to avoid the oncoming Hurricane Frederic. She remained in the Gulf of Mexico with a crew of U.S. Navy sailors and ship builder personnel. After the passage of the storm, she returned to her builders yard for final outfitting and was quickly commissioned with her crew in dungarees in the helo hangar and deck prior to departure for her first homeport of San Diego, California where she was formally commissioned on 21 September 1979 in its home port.

During the mid-to-late 1980s Cushing was a member of the Pacific Fleet Anti-Submarine Warfare Squadron--Destroyer Squadron 31. She was specially modified to support the DESRON staff operations and served as the primary flagship. She was also one of the few of the class that carried the AN/SQR-15 Towed Array Sonar System.

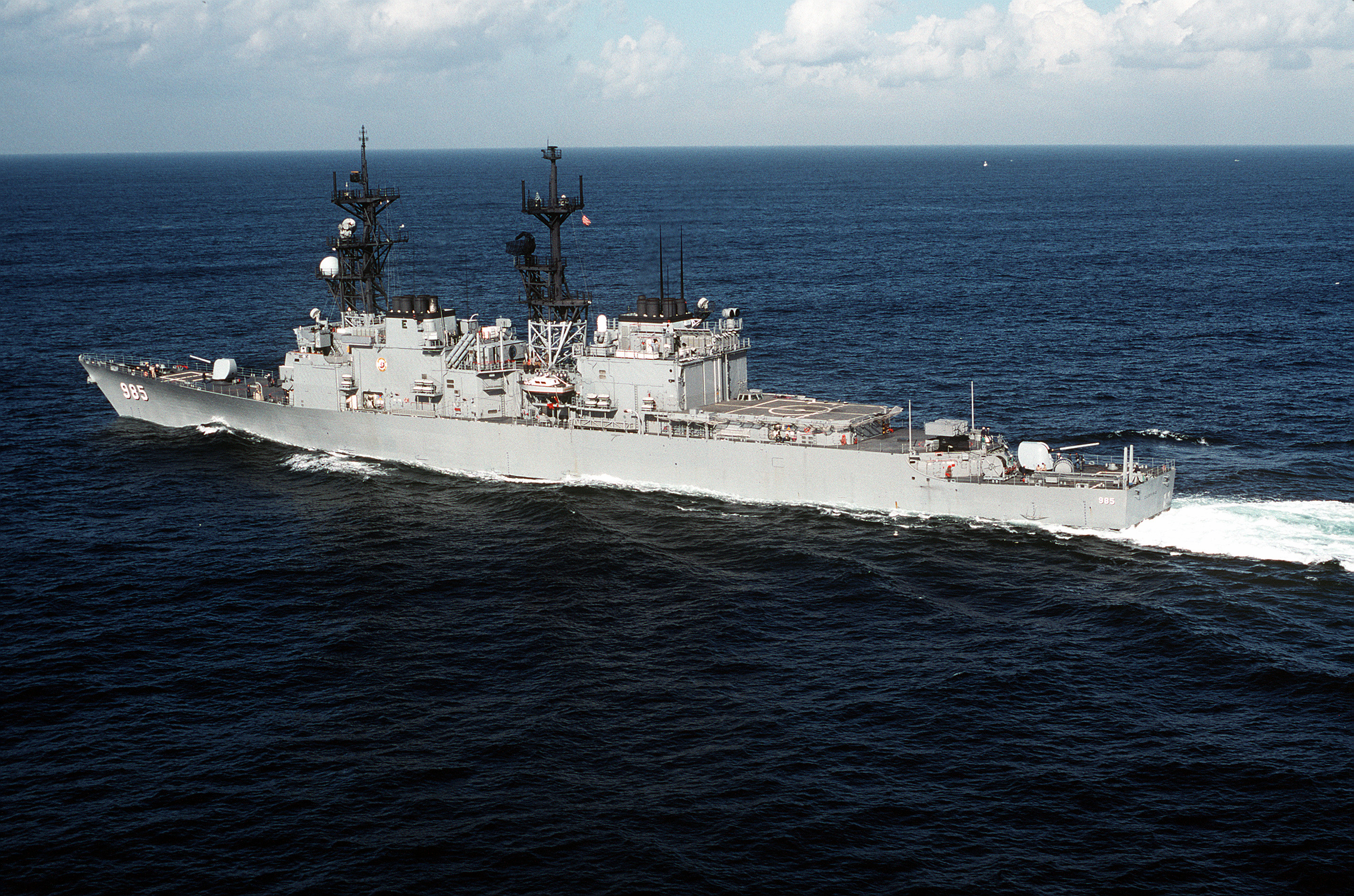
USS Cushing off San Diego in 1990

In the early 1990s Cushing served to demonstrate the effectiveness of rudder roll stabilization (RRS). Engineers from the Carderock Division of the Naval Surface Warfare Center installed the developmental RRS system and monitored its operations. The successful demonstration led to RRS being implemented in Arleigh Burke-class (DDG-51) destroyers. While home ported in Pearl Harbor HI, Cushing conducted cruises in the North Pacific in 1991 and 1992 with visits to the west coast and Canada. In 1992 Cushing deployed to Central and South America as the flagship for UNITAS 33, 92. Cushing passed through the Panama Canal from Pacific to Atlantic side in 1992 embarked the Admiral at Puerto Rico. Cushing circumnavigated South America and passed through the Panama Canal again from the Pacific to the Atlantic side in less than 6 months. After disembarking the Admiral in Puerto Rico the Cushing passed through the Panama Canal again on her return voyage to San Diego then home port Pearl Harbor HI in late 1992. 1993 was spent conducting short cruises at sea around HI and in 1994 Cushing entered dry dock at Pearl Harbor for, among other things, the addition of the VLS (vertical launch system) missile package.

As part of a 1995 reorganization of the Pacific Fleet's surface ships into six core battle groups and eight destroyer squadrons, with the reorganization scheduled to be completed by 1 October, and homeport changes to be completed within the following year, Cushing was reassigned to Destroyer Squadron 5.

A prototype Remote Minehunting System (RMS) was installed onboard Cushing in time for the Fall 1996

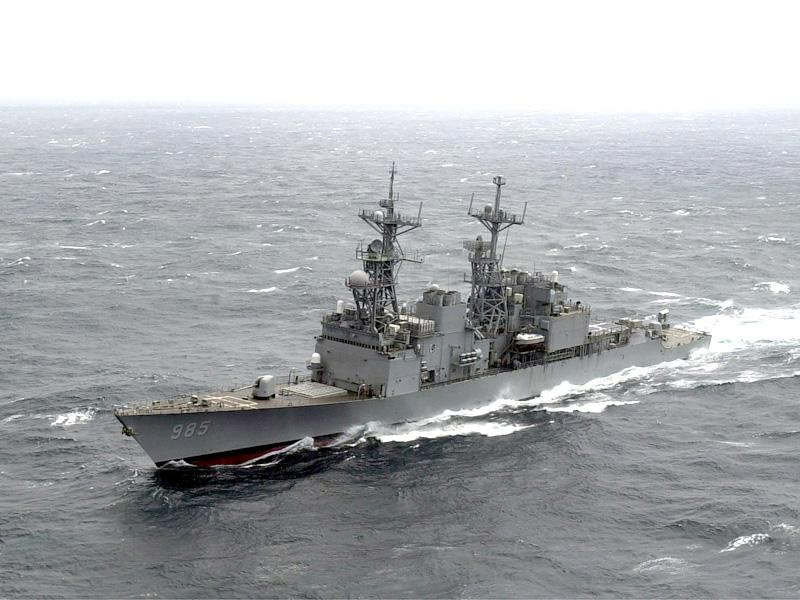
USS Cushing sailing through the South China Sea in April 2001.

USS Kitty Hawk deployment to provide the battle group with a mine reconnaissance capability. This was an upgrade of the system successfully used in 1995 with the additional capability for shipboard launch and recovery and direct interface to the shipboard system. In fiscal year 1997, the RMS concept was successfully demonstrated by employment of a prototype system from Cushing during a Persian Gulf exercise.

In early 1997, Cushing was conducting Maritime Interception Operations in the Persian Gulf.

Cushing departed Pearl Harbor, Hawaii, on 16 March 1998, for its new home port of Yokosuka, Japan. The destroyer had been homeported in Pearl Harbor since 1991 and was set to replace USS Fife (DD-991) which was changing homeports to Everett, Washington. During her time in Pearl Harbor, Cushing made four Western Pacific deployments and one to the South Atlantic. Upon arrival in Japan, Cushing was assigned to Commander, Destroyer Squadron 15, and deployed in May to participate in CARAT '98, a multi-national exercise with navies of Southeast Asian nations. CARAT '98 was the fourth annual Cooperation Afloat Readiness and Training (CARAT) exercise held between the United States and six Southeast Asia countries from 12 May to 5 August 1998. As part of a series of bilateral training exercises, CARAT 98 had U.S. forces training with military forces of Brunei, Indonesia, Malaysia, Thailand, Singapore, and the Philippines. CARAT '98 demonstrated U.S. commitment to security and stability in Southeast Asia while increasing the operational readiness and capabilities of U.S. forces. The exercise also promoted interoperability and cooperation with U.S. regional friends and allies by offering a broad spectrum of mutually beneficial training opportunities.

From 22 to 25 March 1999 Cushing operated along with Battle Force 7th Fleet and took part in a multi-national live-fire missile exercise (MTX 99) in waters near the Marianas Islands. Also involved in the MTX 99 were naval units from Australia, Canada, Singapore, and South Korea. Fired during MTX 99 were live weapons which included Harpoon, Penguin and Maverick missiles, torpedoes and various shipboard weapons systems. The former USS Oklahoma City (CL-91) was used as the target vessel.

Cushing took part in the 38th Foal Eagle exercise held in the fall of 1999. A regularly scheduled exercise, Foal Eagle combined forces from South Korea and the United States. In August 2000, Cushing took part in SHAREM 138. Cushing and various units in the Forward Deployed Naval Force (FDNF), participated in SHAREM (Ship ASW Readiness Effectiveness Measuring) 138 along with units from the host, Japan Maritime Self Defense Force near Okinawa, Japan. Although weather conditions curtailed SHAREM events, valuable training was accomplished in the art of Undersea Warfare (USW).

Cushing took part in Missile Exercise (MISSILEX) 01-1 which was held 17 to 18 November 2000 as part of a coordinated task group operation.

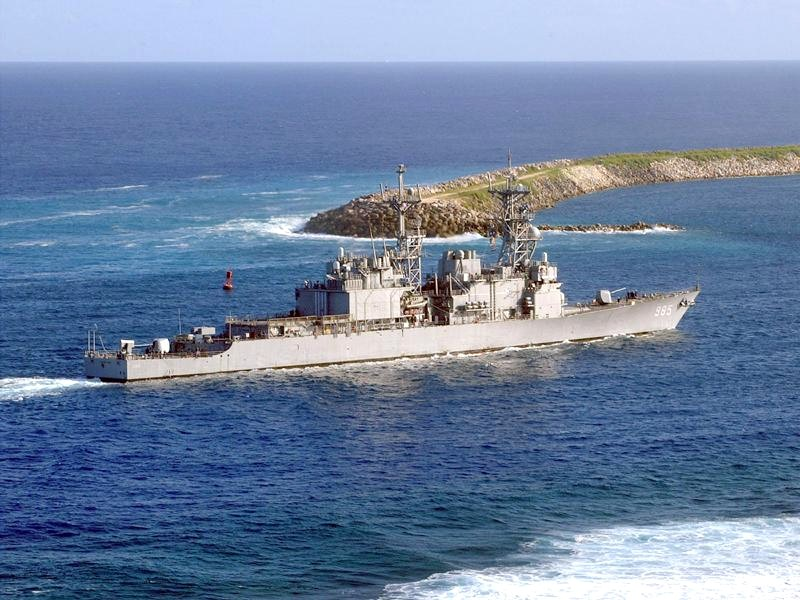
USS Cushing enters Guam's Apra Harbor in October 2001

During a Naval Surface Fire Support exercise held near Guam on 4–5 December 2000, the Cushing posted a better-than-perfect score during a gun shoot. The exercise was designed to test the accuracy and effectiveness of Cushing's guns and the proficiency of its watch teams. When the grade sheets were tallied, with bonus points for superior communications performance, Cushing was awarded 101.5 points out of 100.

Cushing was honored by Commander, Destroyer Squadron 15, when she received the Silver Enlisted Surface Warfare Excellence Pennant on 25 January 2001. As a result, Cushing was now authorized to fly the pennant as all enlisted personnel E5 and senior have qualified as enlisted surface warfare specialists within the required time standard set forth by the Chief of Naval Operations. Cushing was the first ship of Destroyer Squadron 15 to qualify for this award.

The former USS Cushing being towed to the mothball fleet

On 5 July 2002, a U.S. Navy Sikorsky UH-3H Sea King, Desert Duck 744, operated by HC-2, Detachment 2, suffered a tail rotor failure while landing aboard Cushing. It spun out of control and went over the starboard side. The seven on board got out safely.

On 7 November 2003, Cushing began joint exercise Annualex 15G, which included maneuvers with the Japanese Navy.

=== Fate ===
Cushing operated out of Yokosuka, Japan for the last several years of her career. Cushing was the last Spruance-class ship to remain in active service, until decommissioned and stricken from the Navy list on 21 September 2005. GlobalSecurity.org showed the ship listed for grant transfer to Turkey. Ex-Cushing was sunk as a target on 14 July 2008 during RIMPAC 2008 along with USS David R. Ray, USS Fletcher (DD-992) and USS Horne (CG-30).

== Ship's crest ==
Cushing's coat of arms symbolizes the spirit and endeavors of William Barker Cushing, as well as the tradition of destroyers named in honor of this naval officer.

The predominant colors of dark blue and gold are traditionally associated with the Navy and symbolize the sea and excellence. The indented division of the shield represents a log boom and pile and is suggestive of the manner in which Commander Cushing accomplished the sinking of CSS Albemarle. The upper area of the pile is red, alluding to the danger of this famous action and that Commander Cushing was under enemy fire more than any other Union Navy officer. The lion's head is a symbol of courage and strength and signifies the character of Commander Cushing. His spirit is also reflected in the ship's motto, "Non Sibi Sed Patriae", a statement attributed to the ancient Roman Cicero that translates to "Not for Self but for Country". The trident is a traditional maritime symbol and its sharp points suggest offensive action. The spar torpedo is dark blue alluding to the dark night and the covert nature of the sinking of Albemarle. The dark blue also recalls the fact that Commander Cushing took the torpedo, at that time a Confederate weapon, and successfully used it to sink an enemy vessel. The five stars refer to the fact that Cushing is the fifth ship in the U.S. Navy to carry the name.

=== Awards ===
- Navy Unit Commendation - (Jan-May 2003)
- Navy Meritorious Unit Commendation - (Jun-Sep 1984, Jan-Dec 2001)
- Battle "E" - (1982, 1984, 1987, 1997)
- Navy Expeditionary Medal - (Jul-Sep 1981)
- Humanitarian Service Medal - (2 October 1981)
- PACFLT Anti-Submarine Warfare (ASW) Bloodhound Award - (2003)
