= USS Cohoes =

Two ships of the United States Navy have been named Cohoes after the city of Cohoes, New York.

- USS Cohoes (1865) was a light draft monitor.
- USS Cohoes (AN-78) was a net laying ship launched 29 November 1944 by the Commercial Iron Works, in Portland, Oregon.
