= Digester =

A digester is a vessel where chemical or biological reactions are carried out, which may involve the use of heat, enzymes or solvent. They are used in different types of process industries, such as in the production of biogas. Digesters are referred to as reactors in some applications.

== Processes where digesters are used ==
- Anaerobic digestion
- Bayer process
- Kraft process
- Soda process
- Sulfite process
