= List of ironclads of Russia =

List of ironclads of Russia built between 1863 and 1889 for the Imperial Russian Navy.

The initial date corresponds to the launched of the ship and then the decommissioned or end is briefly indicated. Some of these ships managed to provide a minor service in the Soviet Navy before being discarded.

== Ironclads ==
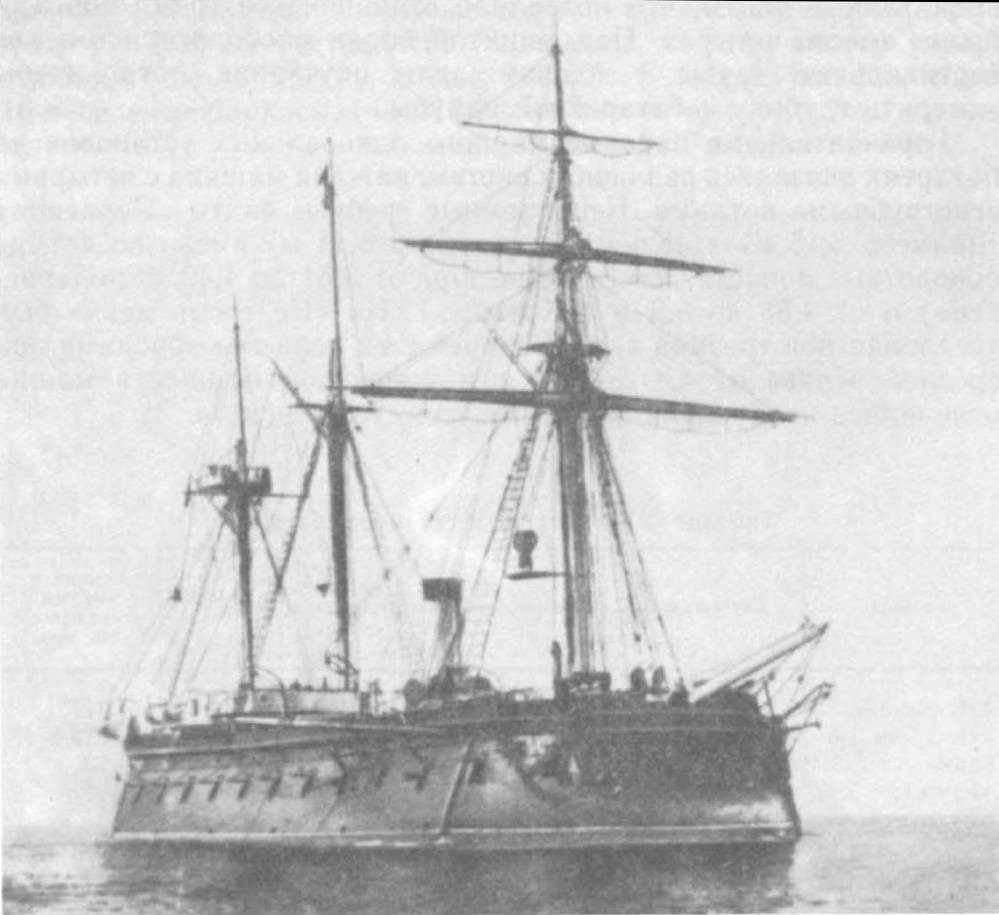
The Pervenets (1863) was the first ironclad of the Imperial Russian Navy, built in a British shipyard.

=== Broadside armored frigates ===
- Pervenets class
  - Pervenets (1863) – sold in 1908 and discarded in the early 1950s
  - Ne Tron Menia (1864) – sold in 1908 and scrapped in the 1950s
  - Kreml (1867) – sold for scrap in 1908
- Sevastopol (1864) – decommissioned in 1885 and sold for scrap in 1897
- Petropavlovsk (1865) – decommissioned in 1885 and sold for scrap in 1892

=== Monitors ===
- Uragan class
  - Uragan (1864) – sold as a barge in 1903 and scrapped in 1918
  - Latnik (1864) – stricken in 1900 and scrapped around 1918
  - Bronenosets (1864) – stricken in 1900 and lost during World War I
  - Veschun (1864) – stricken in 1900 and scrapped around 1918
  - Koldun (1864) – stricken in 1900 and scrapped around 1918
  - Edinorog (1864) – stricken in 1900, final destination unknown
  - Strelets (1864) – stricken in 1900 and converted into a floating workshop in 1955
  - Lava (1864) – stricken in 1900 and scrapped around 1922
  - Tifon (1864) – stricken in 1900 and scrapped after 1922
  - Perun (1864) – stricken in 1900 and scrapped around 1924

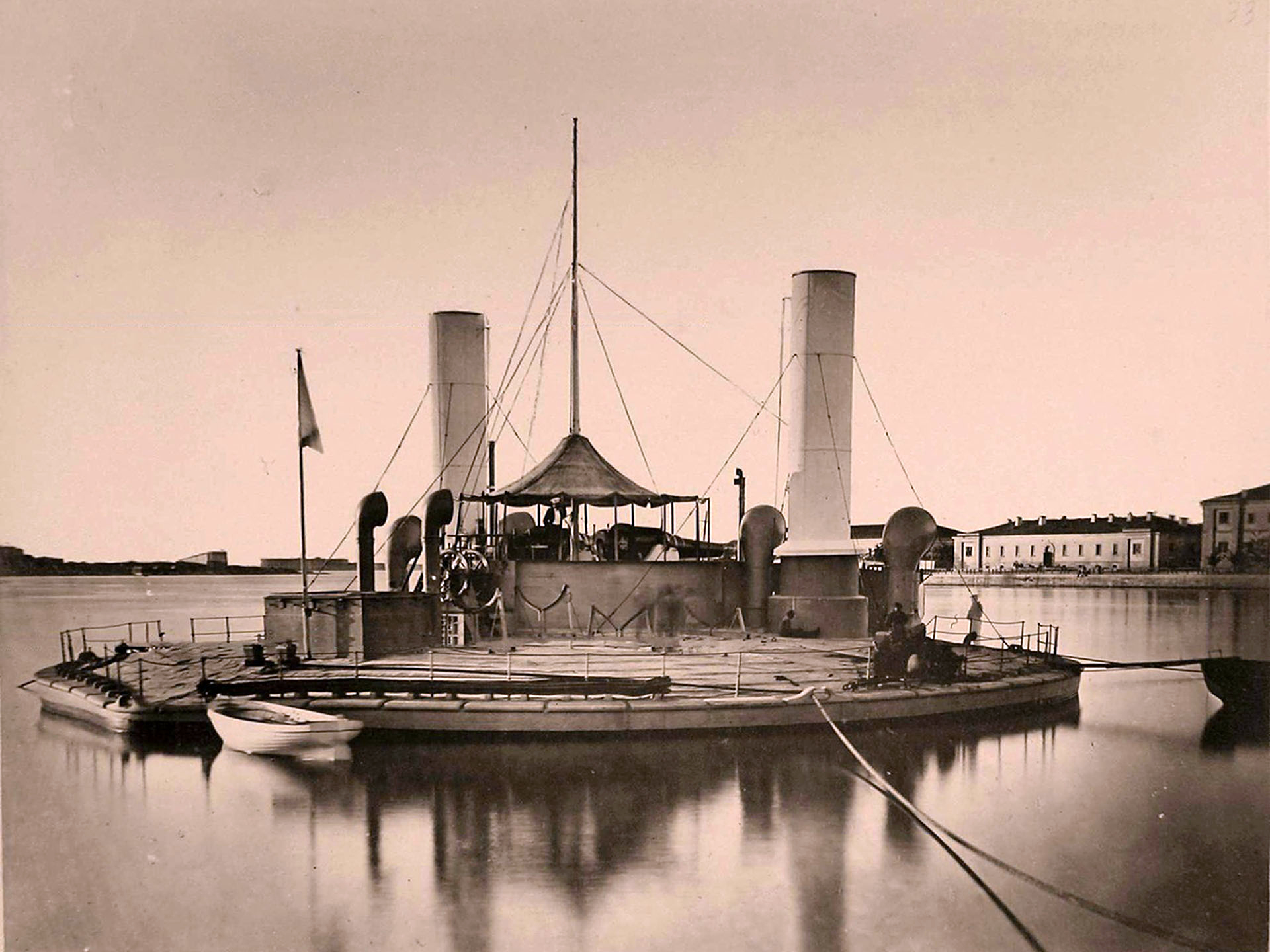
The Novgorod (1873) is considered one of the strangest ships built in naval history.

- Smerch (1864) – stricken and scrapped in 1959
- Charodeika class
  - Charodeika (1867) – stricken in 1907 and scrapped in 1911–12
  - Rusalka (1867) – sank in the Gulf of Finland in 1893
- Admiral Lazarev class
  - Admiral Lazarev (1867) – stricken in 1907 and sank in 1912
  - Admiral Greig (1867) – stricken in 1909 and scrapped in 1912
- Admiral Spiridov class
  - Admiral Spiridov (1868) – stricken in 1907, fate unknown
  - Admiral Chichagov (1868) – stricken in 1907, fate unknown
- Novgorod (1873) – stricken in 1903 and sold for scrap in 1911
- Vitse-admiral Popov (1875) – stricken in 1903 and sold for scrap in 1911

=== Central battery frigate ===
- Kniaz Pozharsky (1867) – struck from the Navy List in 1911

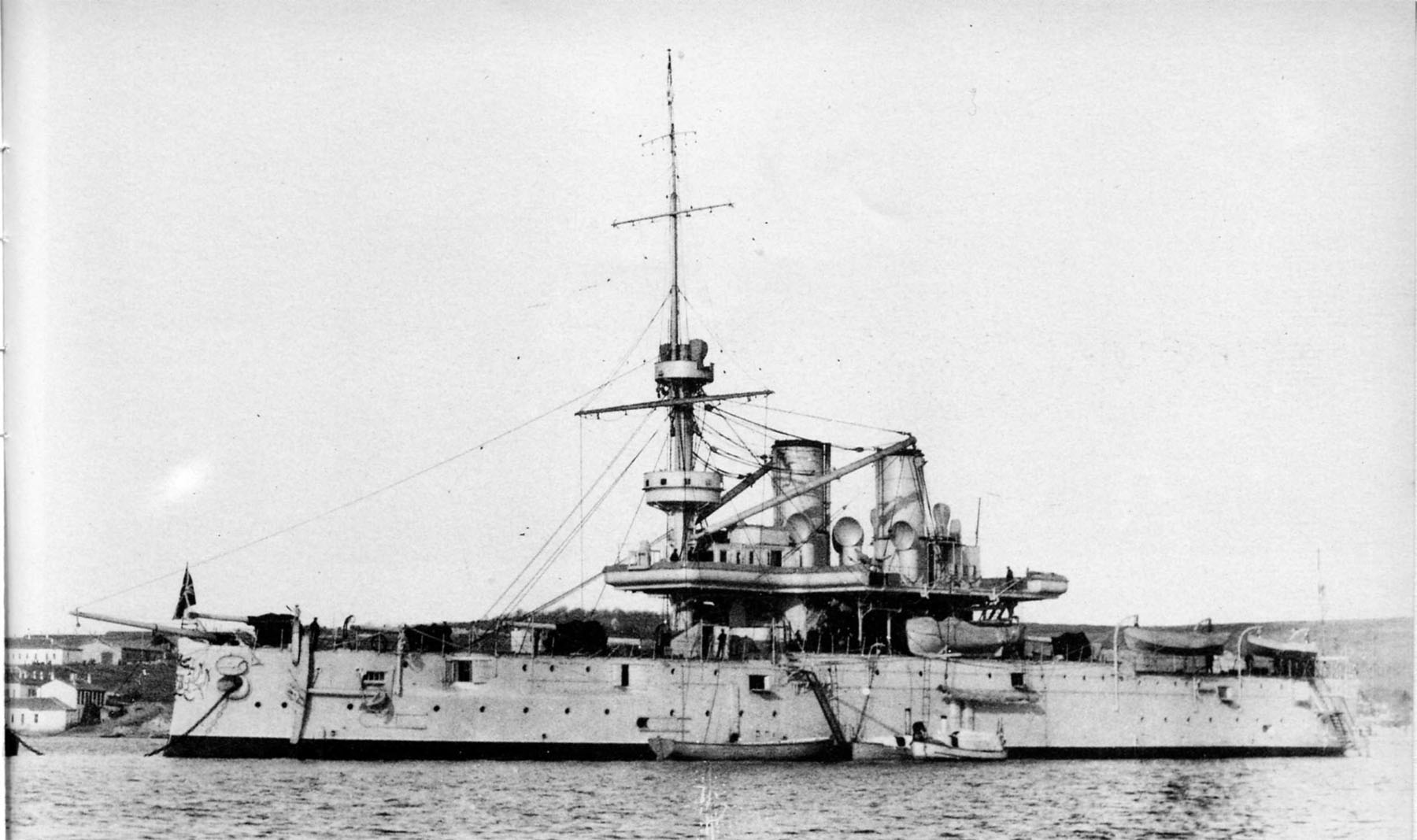
The Georgii Pobedonosets (1892) was part of a class of three ships of a very unusual design having the main guns on three barbettes grouped in a triangle around a central armored redoubt, two side-by-side forward and one on the centerline aft.

=== Ironclad turret ship ===
- Petr Veliky (1872) – stricken in 1959 and subsequently scrapped

=== Barbette ironclads ===
- Ekaterina II class
  - Ekaterina II (1886) – stricken in 1907 and sunk as a target in 1912
  - Chesma (1886) – stricken in 1907 and scrapped mid-1920s
  - Sinop (1887) – disabled in 1919 and sold as scrap in 1922
  - Georgii Pobedonosets (1892) – decommissioned in 1920 and sold as scrap between 1930 and 1936
- Imperator Aleksandr II class
  - Imperator Aleksandr II (1887) – sold for scrapping in 1922
  - Imperator Nikolai I (1889) – captured by the Japanese in 1905, during Russo-Japanese War

== See also ==
- List of ironclads

== Sources ==
- Moiseyev, S. P. (1948). Список кораблей русского парового и броненосного флота (с 1861 по 1917 год) [List of Ships of the Russian Steam and Armoured Fleet, 1861–1917] (in Russian). Moscow: Voyenizdat.
- Apal'kov, Yu. V., ed. (1996). Боевые корабли Русского флота 8.1914-10.1917 гг: Справочник [Warships of the Russian Navy, August 1914 – October 1918: Directory] (in Russian). St. Peterburg: Intek.
- Burov, V. N. (1995). Отечественное военное кораблестроение в третьем столетии своей истории [Domestic Military Shipbuilding in the Third Century of Its History] (in Russian). St. Peterburg: Sudostroyeniye.
