= Russian monitor Lava =

Russian Uragan-class monitor

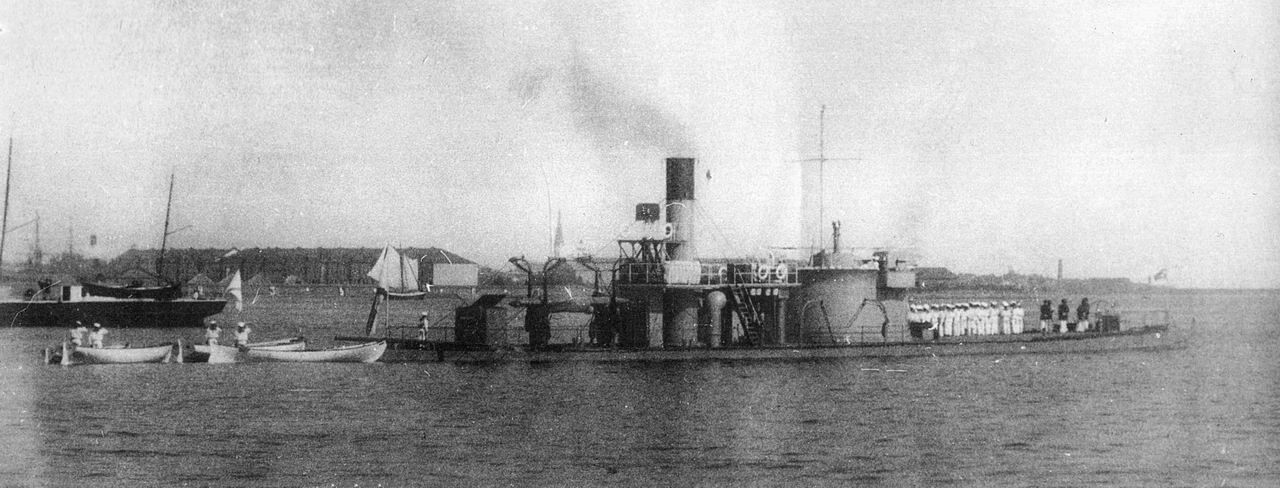
- Sister ship Koldun, in the late 1870s or early 1880s

History

Russian Empire
- Name: Lava (Лава)
- Namesake: Cavalry charge or avalanche
- Ordered: 23 March 1863 (Note: All dates used in this article are New Style.)
- Builder: Semiannikov & Poletika Shipyard, Saint Petersburg
- Cost: 1,142,700 rubles
- Laid down: 15 December 1863
- Launched: 8 June 1864
- In service: 1 September 1865
- Out of service: 6 July 1900
- Renamed: Blokshiv No. 1, 14 April 1912
- Reclassified: As coastal defense ship, 13 February 1892; Converted into a Barracks ship, 1902; A mine storage hulk, 1912; A hospital ship, 1916
- Stricken: 17 August 1900
- Fate: Scrapped around 1922

General characteristics
- Class & type: Uragan-class monitor
- Displacement: 1,500–1,600 long tons (1,524–1,626 t)
- Length: 201 ft (61.3 m)
- Beam: 46 ft (14.0 m)
- Draft: 10.16–10.84 ft (3.1–3.3 m)
- Installed power: 340–500 ihp (254–373 kW); 2 rectangular Morton boilers
- Propulsion: 1 shaft, 1 × 2-cylinder horizontal direct-acting steam engine
- Speed: 6.5 knots (12.0 km/h; 7.5 mph)
- Range: 1,440 nmi (2,670 km; 1,660 mi) at 6 knots (11 km/h; 6.9 mph)
- Complement: 96–110
- Armament: 1865: 2 × 9 in (229 mm) smoothbore guns; 1868: 2 × 15 in (381 mm) smoothbore Rodman guns; 1873: 2 × 9 in (229 mm) rifled guns
- Armor: Hull: 5 in (127 mm); Gun turret: 11 in (279 mm); Funnel base: 6 in (152 mm); Conning tower: 8 in (203 mm)

Lava (Russian: Лава) was an Uragan-class monitor built for the Imperial Russian Navy in the mid-1860s. The design was based on the American Passaic-class monitor, but was modified to suit Russian engines, guns and construction techniques. Spending her entire career with the Baltic Fleet, the ship was only active when the Gulf of Finland was not frozen, but very little is known about her service. She was struck from the Navy List in 1900, converted into a barracks ship in 1902 and then into a storage hulk for mines in 1912 and renamed Blokshiv No. 1. During World War I, she was converted into a hospital ship in 1916 and was then abandoned by the Soviets in Finland in 1918; the ship was probably later scrapped by the Finns around 1922.

== Description ==
Lava was 201 feet (61.3 m) long overall, with a beam of 46 feet (14.0 m) and a draft of 10.16–10.84 feet (3.1–3.3 m). She displaced 1,500–1,600 long tons (1,524–1,626 t), and her crew numbered eight officers and 88 enlisted men in 1865. They numbered 10 officers and 100 crewmen in 1877.

The ship was fitted with a two-cylinder, horizontal direct-acting steam engine built by Carr and MacPherson of Saint Petersburg. It drove a single propeller using steam that was provided by two rectangular boilers. Specific information on the output of the ship's engine has not survived, but it ranged between 340–500 indicated horsepower (254–373 kW) for all the ships of this class. During Lava's sea trials on 12 July 1865, she reached a maximum speed of 6.5 knots (12.0 km/h; 7.5 mph). She carried a maximum of 190 long tons (193 t) of coal, which gave her a theoretical endurance of 1,440 nmi (2,670 km; 1,660 mi) at 6 knots (11 km/h; 6.9 mph).

Lava was designed to be armed with a pair of smoothbore nine-inch (229 mm) muzzle-loading guns purchased from Krupp of Germany and rifled in Russia, but the rifling project was seriously delayed and the ship was completed with nine-inch smoothbores. These lacked the penetration power necessary to deal with ironclads and they were replaced by license-built fifteen-inch (380 mm) smoothbore muzzle-loading Rodman guns in 1867–68. The Rodman guns were replaced around 1876 with the originally intended nine-inch rifled guns.

All of the wrought-iron armor that was used in the Uragan-class monitors was in 1-inch (25 mm) plates, just as in the Passaic-class ships. The side of the ship was entirely covered with three to five layers of armor plates, of which the three innermost plates extended 42 inches (1.1 m) below the waterline. This armor was backed by a wooden beam that had a maximum thickness of 36 inches (914 mm). The gun turret was protected by eleven layers of armor and the pilothouse above it had eight layers of armor. Curved plates six layers thick protected the base of the funnel up to a height of 7 feet (2.1 m) above the deck. Unlike their predecessors, the Uragans were built without deck armor to save weight, but Lava's deck was reinforced by the addition of 0.5-inch (12.7 mm) armor plates after completion.

== Career ==
Construction of the ship began on 7 September 1863 at the Semiannikov & Poletika Shipyard in Saint Petersburg. Lava was laid down on 15 December 1863 and she was launched on 8 June 1864. She entered service on 1 September 1865 and cost a total of 1,142,700 rubles, almost double her contract cost of 600,000 rubles. The ship was assigned to the Baltic Fleet upon completion and she, and all of her sister ships except Latnik, made a port visit to Stockholm, Sweden in July–August 1865 while under the command of General Admiral Grand Duke Konstantin Nikolayevich. She was present when the American warships Miantonomoh and Augusta visited Kronstadt in July–August 1866.

Sometime after Lava was completed, an armored ring, 5 inches (127 mm) thick and 15 inches (381 mm) tall, was fitted around the base of the turret to prevent splinters from jamming it. Later, an armored, outward-curving bulwark was fitted around the top of the turret to protect any crewmen there. Three sponsons were later added, probably during the 1870s, to the upper portion of the turret. Each sponson, one above the gun ports and one on each side of the turret, mounted a light gun, probably a 1.75-inch (44 mm) Engstrem gun, for defense against torpedo boats. A fourth gun was mounted on a platform aft of the funnel when a hurricane deck was built between the funnel and the turret, also probably during the 1870s.

Little is known about the ship's career other than that she was assigned to the newly formed Artillery Training Detachment in March 1870 and she was laid up each winter when the Gulf of Finland froze. Lava was reclassified as a coastal defense ship on 13 February 1892 and turned over to the Port of Kronstadt for disposal on 6 July 1900, although she was not stricken until 17 August. The ship was used as a floating barracks by the Third Destroyer Division from 1902 to 1908 and was then used as an observation post during gunnery training. Lava was converted into a mine storage hulk in 1912 and renamed Blokshiv No. 1 on 14 April of that year. She was converted into a floating hospital in 1916 and may have received her old name at that time. She was abandoned by the Soviets in Helsingfors (Helsinki) when they were forced to withdraw from Finland in April 1918 according to the terms of the Treaty of Brest-Litovsk, but she was later returned by the Finns in 1922. The ship was supposedly broken up there around that time, but may have still been in existence in 1941.
