= Russian monitor Koldun =

Russian Uragan-class monitor

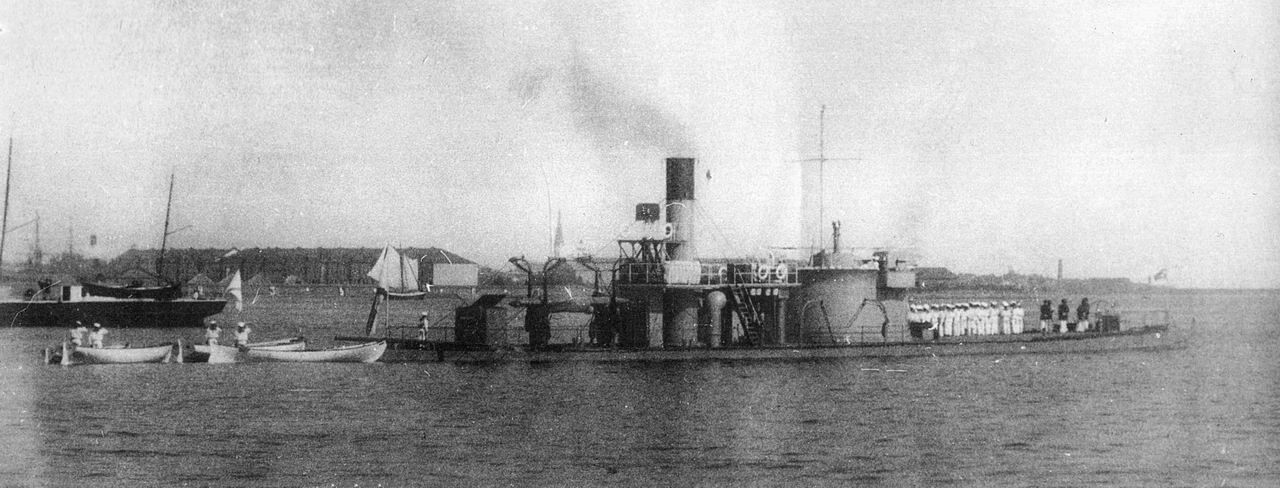
- Koldun, in the late 1870s or early 1880s

History

Russian Empire
- Name: Koldun (Колдун)
- Namesake: Sorcerer
- Ordered: 23 March 1863 (Note: All dates used in this article are New Style.)
- Builder: Cockerill, Belgium
- Cost: 1,237,000 rubles
- Laid down: 9 December 1863
- Launched: 8 May 1864
- In service: 1865
- Out of service: 6 July 1900
- Reclassified: As coastal defense ship, 13 February 1892
- Stricken: 17 August 1900
- Fate: Converted into a coal barge, 1903, and scrapped around 1918

General characteristics
- Class & type: Uragan-class monitor
- Displacement: 1,500–1,600 long tons (1,524–1,626 t)
- Length: 201 ft (61.3 m)
- Beam: 46 ft (14.0 m)
- Draft: 10.16–10.84 ft (3.1–3.3 m)
- Installed power: 340–500 ihp (254–373 kW); 2 rectangular Morton boilers
- Propulsion: 1 shaft, 1 × 2-cylinder horizontal direct-acting steam engine
- Speed: 6 knots (11 km/h; 6.9 mph)
- Range: 1,440 nmi (2,670 km; 1,660 mi) at 6 knots (11 km/h; 6.9 mph)
- Complement: 96–110
- Armament: 1865: 2 × 9 in (229 mm) smoothbore guns; 1868: 2 × 15 in (381 mm) smoothbore Rodman guns; 1873: 2 × 9 in (229 mm) rifled guns
- Armor: Hull: 5 in (127 mm); Gun turret: 11 in (279 mm); Funnel base: 6 in (152 mm); Conning tower: 11 in (279 mm)

Koldun (Russian: Колдун) was an Uragan-class monitor built for the Imperial Russian Navy in Belgium in the mid-1860s. The design was based on the American Passaic-class monitor, but was modified to suit Russian engines, guns and construction techniques. She was one of two ships of the class to be built in Belgium and assembled in Russia. Spending her entire career with the Baltic Fleet, the ship was only active when the Gulf of Finland was not frozen, but very little is known about her service. She was stricken in 1900 from the Navy List, converted into a coal barge in 1903 and renamed Barzha No. 324. Abandoned by the Soviets in Finland in 1918, the ship was later scrapped by the Finns.

== Description ==
Koldun was 201 feet (61.3 m) long overall, with a beam of 46 feet (14.0 m) and a draft of 10.16–10.84 feet (3.1–3.3 m). She displaced 1,500–1,600 long tons (1,500–1,600 t), and her crew numbered eight officers and 88 enlisted men in 1865. They numbered 10 officers and 100 crewmen in 1877.

The ship was fitted with a two-cylinder, horizontal direct-acting steam engine built by the Belgian Cockerill Company. It drove a single propeller using steam that was provided by two rectangular boilers. Specific information on the output of the ship's engine has not survived, but it ranged between 340–500 indicated horsepower (254–373 kW) for all the ships of this class. During Koldun's sea trials on 21 July 1864, she reached a maximum speed of 6 knots (11 km/h; 6.9 mph). The ship carried a maximum of 190 long tons (190 t) of coal, which gave her a theoretical endurance of 1,440 nmi (2,670 km; 1,660 mi) at 6 knots (11 km/h; 6.9 mph).

Koldun was designed to be armed with a pair of 9-inch (229 mm) smoothbore muzzle-loading guns purchased from Krupp of Germany and rifled in Russia, but the rifling project was seriously delayed and the ship was completed with nine-inch smoothbores. These lacked the penetration power necessary to deal with ironclads and they were replaced by license-built 15-inch (380 mm) smoothbore muzzle-loading Rodman guns in 1867–68. The Rodman guns were replaced around 1876 with the originally intended nine-inch rifled guns.

All of the wrought-iron armor that was used in the Uragan-class monitors was in 1-inch (25 mm) plates, just as in the Passaic-class ships. The side of the ship was entirely covered with three to five layers of armor plates, of which the three innermost plates extended 42 inches (1.1 m) below the waterline. This armor was backed by a wooden beam that had a maximum thickness of 36 inches (914 mm). The gun turret and the pilothouse above it was protected by eleven layers of armor. The conning tower armor was 11 inches (279 mm) thick. Curved plates six layers thick protected the base of the funnel up to a height of 7 feet (2.1 m) above the deck. Unlike their predecessors, the Uragans were built without deck armor to save weight, but Koldun's deck was reinforced by the addition of 0.5-inch (12.7 mm) armor plates after completion.

== Construction and career ==
Construction of Koldun began on 9 November 1863 by the Belgian firm of Cockerill for assembly in Saint Petersburg. The ship was laid down on 9 December 1863 and she was launched on 8 May 1864. She entered service on 1865 and cost a total of 1,237,000 rubles, almost double her contract cost of 600,000 rubles. The ship was assigned to the Baltic Fleet upon completion and she, and all of her sister ships except Latnik, made a port visit to Stockholm, Sweden in July–August 1865 while under the command of General Admiral Grand Duke Konstantin Nikolayevich.

Sometime after Koldun was completed, an armored ring, 5 inches (127 mm) thick and 15 inches (381 mm) tall, was fitted around the base of the turret to prevent splinters from jamming it. Later, an armored, outward-curving bulwark was fitted around the top of the turret to protect any crewmen there. Three sponsons were later added, probably during the 1870s, to the upper portion of the turret. Each sponson, one above the gun ports and one on each side of the turret, mounted a light gun, probably a 1.75-inch (44 mm) Engstrem gun, for defense against torpedo boats. A fourth gun was mounted on a platform aft of the funnel when a hurricane deck was built between the funnel and the turret, also probably during the 1870s.

Little is known about the ship's career other than that she was laid up each winter when the Gulf of Finland froze. Koldun was reclassified as a coast defense ironclad on 13 February 1892 and turned over to the Port of Kronstadt for disposal on 6 July 1900, although she was not stricken until 17 August. During 1903, the ship was converted into a coal barge by the removal of her turret, her side armor, and its wooden backing, and by the division of her hull into three holds. She was redesignated as Barzha No. 31, Barzha No. 50 and, in 1914, Barzha No. 323. The ship was abandoned by the Soviets when they were forced to withdraw from Finland in April 1918 according to the terms of the Treaty of Brest-Litovsk and was later scrapped by the Finns.
