= Russian monitor Veschun =

Russian Uragan-class monitor

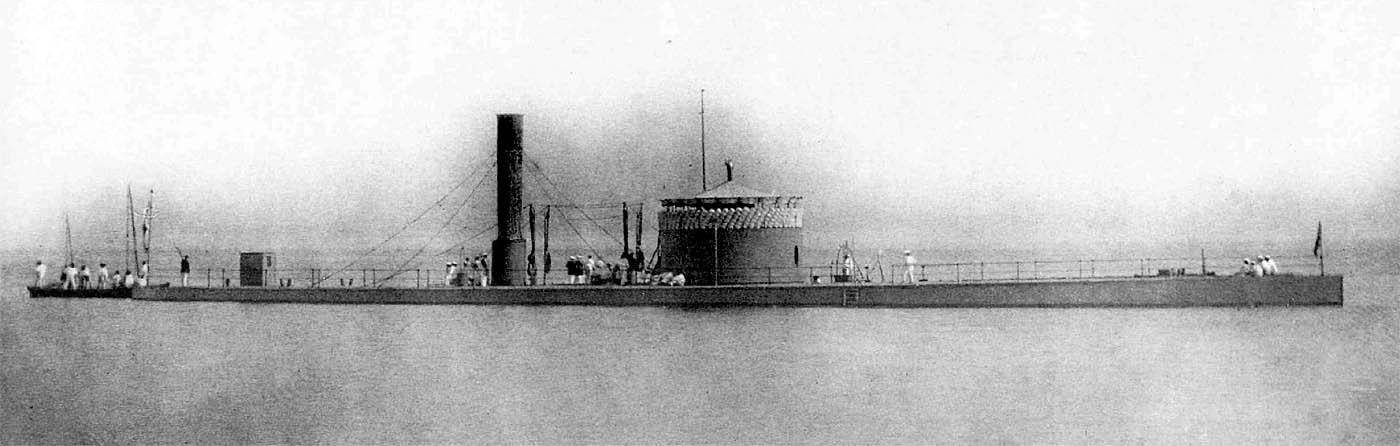
- Veschun not long after completion

History

Russian Empire
- Name: Veschun (Вещун)
- Namesake: Soothsayer or Prophet
- Ordered: 23 March 1863 (Note: All dates used in this article are New Style.)
- Builder: Cockerill, Belgium
- Cost: 1,237,000 rubles
- Laid down: 9 December 1863
- Launched: 8 May 1864
- In service: 1865
- Out of service: 6 July 1900
- Reclassified: As coastal defense ship, 13 February 1892
- Stricken: 17 August 1900
- Fate: Converted into a coal barge, 1903, and scrapped around 1918

General characteristics
- Class & type: Uragan-class monitor
- Displacement: 1,500–1,600 long tons (1,524–1,626 t)
- Length: 201 ft (61.3 m)
- Beam: 46 ft (14.0 m)
- Draft: 10.16–10.84 ft (3.1–3.3 m)
- Installed power: 340–500 ihp (254–373 kW); 2 rectangular Morton boilers
- Propulsion: 1 shaft, 1 × 2-cylinder horizontal direct-acting steam engine
- Speed: 6.75 knots (12.50 km/h; 7.77 mph)
- Range: 1,440 nmi (2,670 km; 1,660 mi) at 6 knots (11 km/h; 6.9 mph)
- Complement: 96–110
- Armament: 1865: 2 × 9 in (229 mm) smoothbore guns; 1868: 2 × 15 in (381 mm) smoothbore Rodman guns; 1873: 2 × 9 in (229 mm) rifled guns
- Armor: Hull: 5 in (127 mm); Gun turret: 11 in (279 mm); Funnel base: 6 in (152 mm); Conning tower: 8 in (203 mm)

Veshchun (Russian: Вещун) was an Uragan-class monitor built for the Imperial Russian Navy in Belgium during the mid-1860s. The design was based on the American Passaic-class monitor, but modified to suit Russian engines, guns, and construction techniques. She was one of two ships of the class built in Belgium and assembled in Russia. She served her entire career with the Baltic Fleet, operating only when the Gulf of Finland was not frozen. Little is known about her specific service. She was stricken from the Navy List in 1900, converted into a coal barge in 1903, and renamed Barzha No. 44 then Barzha No. 327. Abandoned by the Soviets in Finland in 1918, the ship was subsequently scrapped by the Finns.

== Description ==
Veshchun was 201 feet (61.3 m) long overall, with a beam of 46 feet (14.0 m) and a draft of 10.16–10.84 feet (3.1–3.3 m). She displaced between 1,500–1,600 long tons (1,500–1,600 t), and her crew numbered eight officers and 88 enlisted men in 1865. By 1877, this had increased to 10 officers and 100 crewmen.

The ship was fitted with a two-cylinder, horizontal direct-acting steam engine built by the Belgian firm of Cockerill. It drove a single propeller using steam provided by two rectangular boilers. Specific information on the output of the ship's engine has not survived, but the engines for the class ranged between 340–500 indicated horsepower (254–373 kW). During Veshchun''s sea trials on 21 July 1864, she reached a maximum speed of 6.75 knots (12.50 km/h; 7.77 mph). The ship carried a maximum of 190 long tons (190 t) of coal, giving her a theoretical endurance of 1,440 nmi (2,670 km; 1,660 mi) at 6 knots (11 km/h; 6.9 mph).

Veshchun was originally intended to be armed with a pair of 9-inch (229 mm) smoothbore muzzle-loading guns purchased from Krupp of Germany and rifled in Russia. However, the rifling project was significantly delayed, and the ship was completed with nine-inch smoothbores instead. These guns lacked the penetration power needed to engage ironclads effectively, so they were replaced in 1867–68 by license-built 15-inch (380 mm) smoothbore muzzle-loading Rodman guns. The Rodman guns were in turn replaced around 1876 with the originally planned nine-inch rifled guns.

All wrought-iron armor used in the Uragan-class monitors consisted of 1-inch (25 mm) plates, similar to the Passaic-class ships. The ship's side was entirely covered with three to five layers of armor plates, with the three innermost plates extending 42 inches (1.1 m) below the waterline. This armor was backed by wooden beams with a maximum thickness of 36 inches (914 mm). The gun turret and the pilothouse above it were protected by eleven layers of armor. Curved plates six layers thick protected the base of the funnel up to a height of 7 feet (2.1 m) above the deck. Unlike their predecessors, the Uragans were built without deck armor to save weight, but Veshchun''s deck was later prepared for the addition of 0.5-inch (12.7 mm) armor plates, although these were never installed.

== Construction and career ==
Construction of Veshchun by the Belgian firm of Cockerill for assembly in Saint Petersburg began on 9 November 1863. The ship was laid down on 9 December 1863 and launched on 8 May 1864. She entered service in 1865, at a total cost of 1,237,000 rubles, nearly double her contract cost of 600,000 rubles. Upon completion, the ship was assigned to the Baltic Fleet. In July–August 1865, she, along with all of her sister ships except Latnik, made a port visit to Stockholm, Sweden, under the command of General Admiral Grand Duke Konstantin Nikolayevich.

Sometime after Veshchun was completed, an armored ring 5 inches (127 mm) thick and 15 inches (381 mm) tall was fitted around the base of the turret to prevent shell splinters from jamming it. Later, an armored, outward-curving bulwark was fitted around the top of the turret to protect crew members there. Three sponsons were also added to the upper portion of the turret, likely during the 1870s. Each sponson—one above the gun ports and one on each side of the turret—mounted a light gun, likely a 1.75-inch (44 mm) Engstrem gun, for defense against torpedo boats. A fourth gun was mounted on a platform aft of the funnel when a hurricane deck was built between the funnel and the turret, also probably in the 1870s.

Little is known about the ship's career beyond the fact that she was laid up each winter when the Gulf of Finland froze. Veshchun was reclassified as a coast-defense ironclad on 13 February 1892 and turned over to the Port of Kronstadt for disposal on 6 July 1900, although she was not formally stricken until 17 August. In 1903, the ship was converted into a coal barge by removing her turret, side armor, and wooden backing, and by dividing her hull into three holdss. She was redesignated as Barzha No. 44 and, in 1914, as Barzha No. 327. The ship was abandoned by the Soviets in Finland in April 1918 following the terms of the Treaty of Brest-Litovsk and was later scrapped by the Finns.
