= Russian monitor Tifon =

Russian Uragan-class monitor

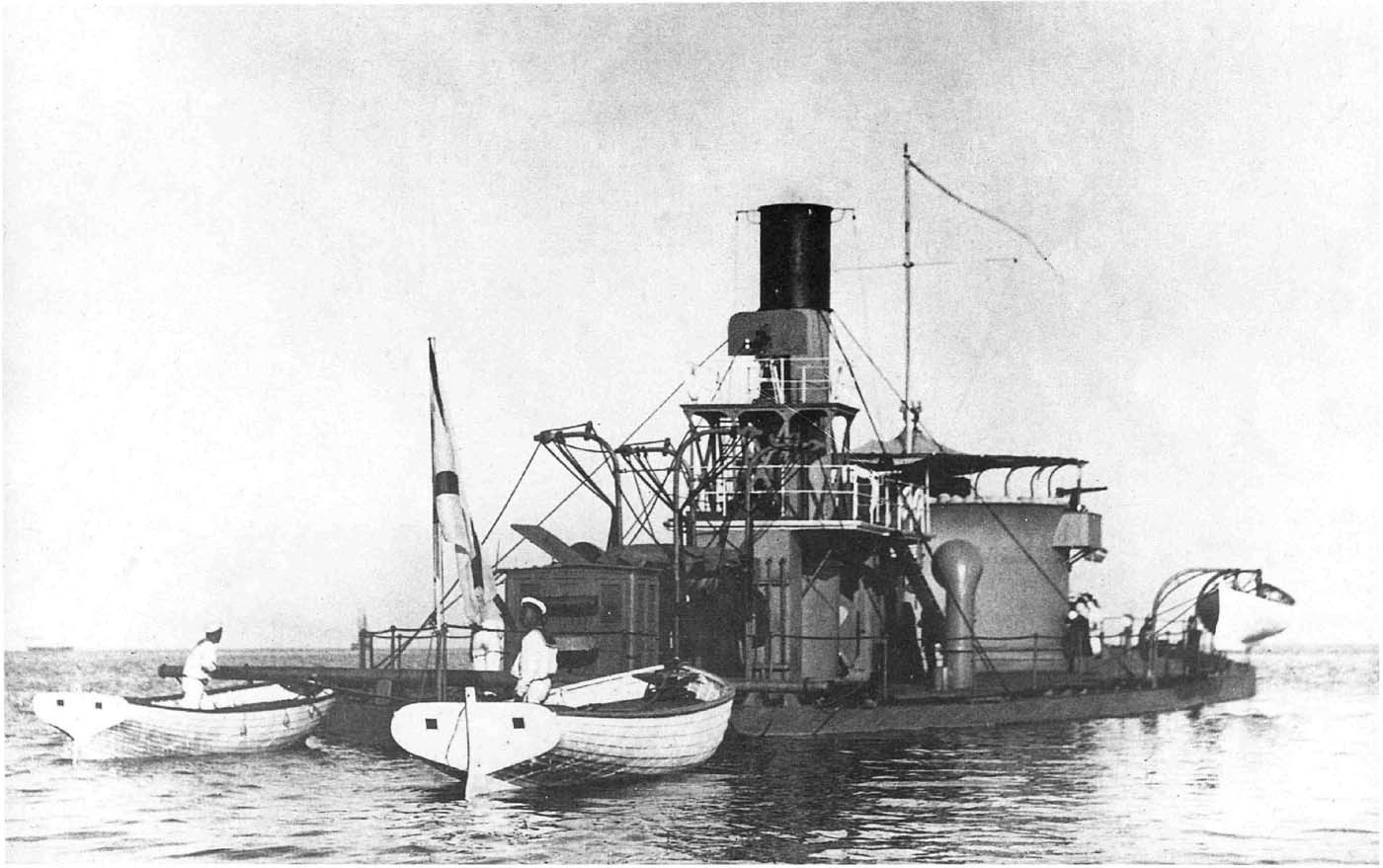
- Tifon or Koldun after the mid-1870s

History

Russian Empire
- Name: Tifon (Тифон)
- Namesake: Typhoon
- Ordered: 23 March 1863 (Note: All dates used in this article are New Style.)
- Builder: New Admiralty Shipyard, Saint Petersburg
- Cost: 1,105,800 rubles
- Laid down: 1 December 1863
- Launched: 27 June 1864
- In service: 1865
- Out of service: 6 July 1900
- Reclassified: As coastal defense ship, 13 February 1892
- Stricken: 17 August 1900
- Fate: Converted into a mine storage hulk, 1909, and scrapped after 1922

General characteristics
- Class & type: Uragan-class monitor
- Displacement: 1,500–1,600 long tons (1,524–1,626 t)
- Length: 201 ft (61.3 m)
- Beam: 46 ft (14.0 m)
- Draft: 10.16–10.84 ft (3.1–3.3 m)
- Installed power: 340–500 ihp (254–373 kW); 2 rectangular Morton boilers
- Propulsion: 1 shaft, 1 × 2-cylinder horizontal direct-acting steam engine
- Speed: 6.7 knots (12.4 km/h; 7.7 mph)
- Range: 1,440 nmi (2,670 km; 1,660 mi) at 6 knots (11 km/h; 6.9 mph)
- Complement: 96–110
- Armament: 2 × 9 in (229 mm) smoothbore guns
- Armor: Hull: 5 in (127 mm); Gun turret: 11 in (279 mm); Funnel base: 6 in (152 mm); Conning tower: 8 in (203 mm)

Tifon (Russian: Тифон) was an Uragan-class monitor built for the Imperial Russian Navy in the mid-1860s. The design was based on the American Passaic-class monitor, but was modified to suit Russian engines, guns and construction techniques. Spending her entire career with the Baltic Fleet, the ship was only active when the Gulf of Finland was not frozen, but very little is known about her service. She was struck from the Navy List in 1900, converted into a storage hulk for mines in 1909 and renamed Blokshiv No. 3. The ship was abandoned by the Soviets in Finland in 1918; although retroceded to the Soviets in 1922, she was later scrapped by the Finns.

== Description ==
While the Uragans were extensively modified by the Russians, they did retain the single twin-gun turret and low freeboard of the original Passaic-class design. Tifon was 201 feet (61.3 m) long overall, with a beam of 46 feet (14.0 m) and a draft of 10.16–10.84 feet (3.1–3.3 m). She displaced 1,500–1,600 long tons (1,500–1,600 t), and her crew numbered 8 officers and 88 enlisted men in 1865. They numbered 10 officers and 100 crewmen in 1877.

The ship was fitted with a two-cylinder, horizontal direct-acting steam engine built by the Baird Works of Saint Petersburg. It drove a single propeller using steam that was provided by two rectangular boilers. Specific information on the output of the ship's engine has not survived, but it ranged between 340–500 indicated horsepower (254–373 kW) for all the ships of this class. During Tifon's sea trials on 19 June 1865, she reached a maximum speed of 6.7 knots (12.4 km/h; 7.7 mph). The ship carried a maximum of 190 long tons (190 t) of coal, which gave her a theoretical endurance of 1,440 nmi (2,670 km; 1,660 mi) at full speed.

Tifon was designed to be armed with a pair of 9-inch (229 mm) smoothbore muzzle-loading guns purchased from Krupp of Germany and rifled in Russia, but the rifling project was seriously delayed and the ship was completed with the Krupp smoothbore guns. These lacked the penetration power necessary to deal with ironclads and they were replaced by license-built 15-inch (380 mm) smoothbore muzzle-loading Rodman guns in 1867–68. The Rodmans were replaced around 1876 with the originally intended nine-inch rifled guns.

All of the wrought-iron armor that was used in the Uragan-class monitors was in 1-inch (25 mm) plates, just as in the Passaic-class ships. The side of the ship was entirely covered with three to five layers of armor plates, of which the three innermost plates extended 42 inches (1.1 m) below the waterline. The gun turret was protected by eleven layers of armor and the pilothouse above it had eight layers of armor. Curved plates six layers thick protected the base of the funnel up to a height of 7 feet (2.1 m) above the deck. Unlike their predecessors, the Uragans were built without deck armor to save weight, but Tifon was modified for the addition of 0.5-inch (12.7 mm) armor plates after completion, although it is unknown if they were ever fitted. They were, however, manufactured and then placed in storage.

== Construction and career ==
Construction of the ship began on 13 June 1863 at the New Admiralty Shipyard in Saint Petersburg. Tifon was laid down on 1 December 1863 and she was launched on 27 May 1864. She entered service in 1865 and cost a total of 1,105,800 rubles, almost double her contract cost of 600,000 rubles. The ship was assigned to the Baltic Fleet upon completion and she, and all of her sister ships except Latnik, made a port visit to Stockholm, Sweden in July–August 1865 while under the command of General Admiral Grand Duke Konstantin Nikolayevich.

Sometime after Tifon was completed, an armored ring, 5 inches (127 mm) thick and 15 inches (381 mm) tall, was fitted around the base of the turret to prevent splinters from jamming it. Later, an armored, outward-curving bulwark was fitted around the top of the turret to protect any crewmen there. Three sponsons were later added, probably during the 1870s, to the upper portion of the turret. Each sponson, one above the gun ports and one on each side of the turret, mounted a light gun, probably a 1.75-inch (44 mm) Engstrem gun, for defense against torpedo boats. A fourth gun was mounted on a platform aft of the funnel when a hurricane deck was built between the funnel and the turret, also probably during the 1870s.

Little is known about the ship's career other than that she was laid up each winter when the Gulf of Finland froze. Tifon was reclassified as a coast-defense ironclad on 13 February 1892 and turned over to the Port of Kronstadt for disposal on 6 July 1900, although she was not stricken until 17 August. Tifon was converted into a mine storage hulk in 1909 and renamed Blokshiv No. 3 on 27 October of that year. She was abandoned by the Soviets in Helsingfors (Helsinki) when they were forced to withdraw from Finland in April 1918 according to the terms of the Treaty of Brest-Litovsk, but she was later returned by the Finns in 1922. The ship was subsequently broken up in Finland.
