= Russian monitor Edinorog =

Russian Uragan-class monitor

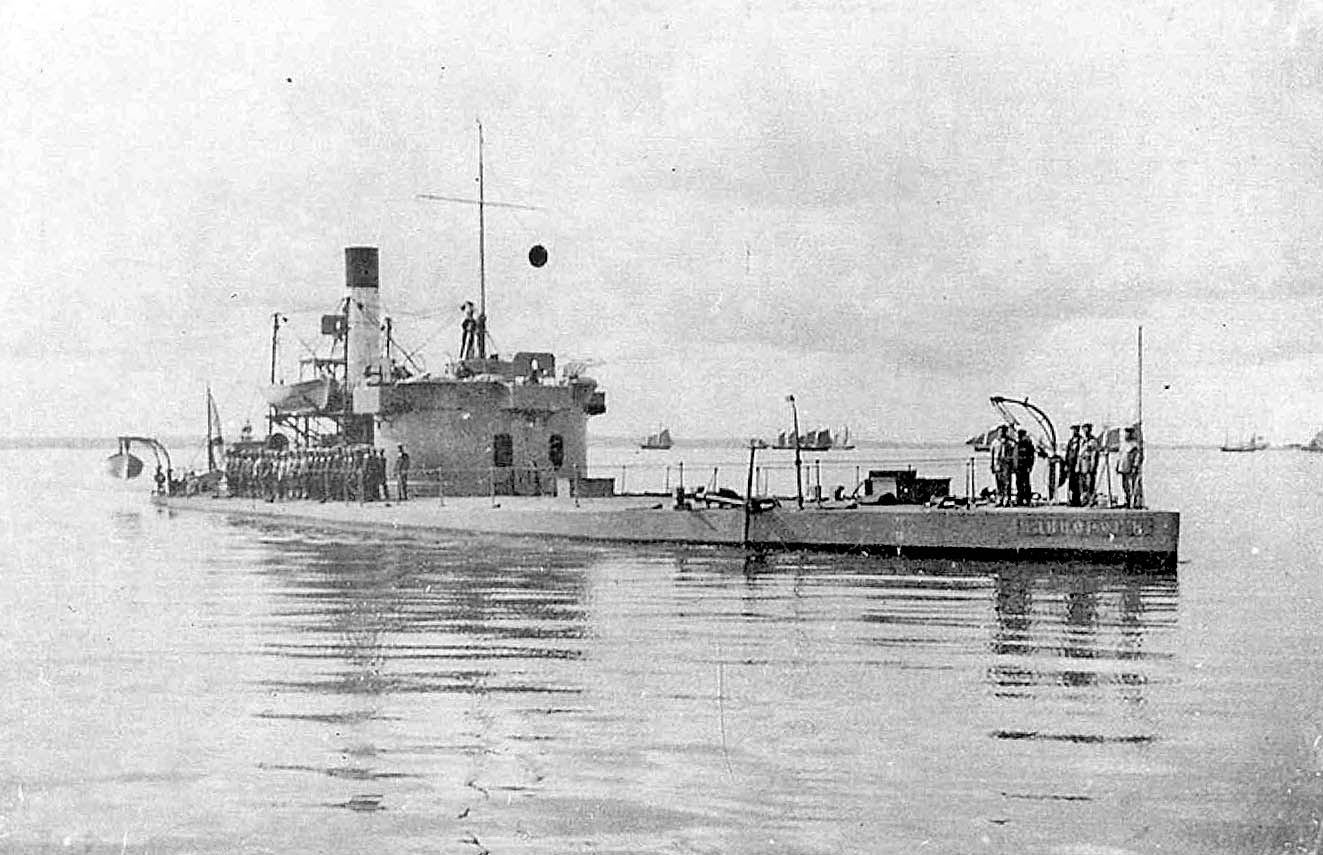
- Edinorog after the late 1870s

History

Russian Empire
- Name: Edinorog (Единорог)
- Namesake: Unicorn
- Ordered: 23 March 1863 (Note: All dates used in this article are New Style.)
- Builder: Galeryni Island Shipyard, Saint Petersburg
- Cost: 1,141,800 rubles
- Laid down: 1 December 1863
- Launched: 2 June 1864
- In service: 27 July 1865
- Out of service: 6 July 1900
- Renamed: Blokshiv No. 4, 10 July 1912; Blokshiv No. 2, 1 January 1932; BSh-2, 16 May 1949
- Reclassified: As coastal defense ship, 13 February 1892
- Stricken: 17 August 1900
- Fate: Converted into a mine storage hulk, 1912

General characteristics
- Class & type: Uragan-class monitor
- Displacement: 1,500–1,600 long tons (1,524–1,626 t)
- Length: 201 ft (61.3 m)
- Beam: 46 ft (14.0 m)
- Draft: 10.16–10.84 ft (3.1–3.3 m)
- Installed power: 340–500 ihp (254–373 kW); 2 rectangular boilers
- Propulsion: 1 shaft, 1 × 2-cylinder horizontal direct-acting steam engine
- Speed: 5.75 knots (10.65 km/h; 6.62 mph)
- Range: 1,440 nmi (2,670 km; 1,660 mi) at 6 knots (11 km/h; 6.9 mph)
- Complement: 96–110
- Armament: 1865: 2 × 9 in (229 mm) smoothbore guns; 1868: 2 × 10.75 in (273 mm) smoothbore guns; 1873: 2 × 9 in (229 mm) rifled guns
- Armor: Hull: 5 in (127 mm); Gun turret: 11 in (279 mm); Funnel base: 6 in (152 mm); Conning tower: 8 in (203 mm)

Edinorog (Russian: Единорог) was one of 10 Uragan-class monitors built for the Imperial Russian Navy in the mid-1860s. The design was based on the American Passaic-class monitor, but was modified to suit Russian engines, guns and construction techniques. Spending her entire career with the Baltic Fleet, the ship was only active when the Gulf of Finland was not frozen, but very little is known about her service. She was struck from the Navy List in 1900, converted into a storage hulk for mines in 1912 and renamed Blokshiv No. 4. The ship survived World War II and was stricken in 1957, although her ultimate fate is unknown.

== Description ==
Edinorog was 201 feet (61.3 m) long overall, with a beam of 46 feet (14.0 m) and a draft of 10.16–10.84 feet (3.1–3.3 m). She displaced 1,500–1,600 long tons (1,500–1,600 t), and her crew numbered eight officers and 88 enlisted men in 1865. They numbered 10 officers and 100 crewmen in 1877.

The ship was fitted with a two-cylinder, horizontal direct-acting steam engine built by the Baird Works of Saint Petersburg. It drove a single propeller using steam that was provided by two Morton rectangular boilers. Specific information on the output of the ship's engine has not survived, but it ranged between 340–500 indicated horsepower (254–373 kW) for all the ships of this class. During Edinorog's sea trials on 19 June 1865, she reached a maximum speed of 5.75 knots (10.65 km/h; 6.62 mph), the second slowest ship in the class. The ship carried a maximum of 190 long tons (190 t) of coal, which gave her a theoretical endurance of 1,440 nautical miles (2,670 km; 1,660 mi) at 6 knots (11 km/h; 6.9 mph).

Edinorog was designed to be armed with a pair of 9-inch (229 mm) smoothbore muzzle-loading guns purchased from Krupp of Germany and rifled in Russia, but the rifling project was seriously delayed and the ship was completed with nine-inch smoothbores. These lacked the penetration power necessary to deal with ironclads and they were replaced by license-built 15-inch (380 mm) smoothbore muzzle-loading Rodman guns in 1867–68. The Rodman guns were replaced around 1876 with the originally intended nine-inch rifled guns.

All of the wrought-iron armor that was used in the Uragan-class monitors was in 1-inch (25 mm) plates, just as in the Passaic-class ships. The side of the ship was entirely covered with three to five layers of armor plates, of which the three innermost plates extended 42 inches (1.1 m) below the waterline. This armor was backed by a wooden beam that had a maximum thickness of 36 inches (914 mm). The gun turret was protected by eleven layers of armor and the pilothouse above it had eight layers of armor. Curved plates six layers thick protected the base of the funnel up to a height of 7 feet (2.1 m) above the deck. Unlike their predecessors, the Uragans were built without deck armor to save weight, but Edinorog was modified for the addition of 0.5-inch (12.7 mm) armor plates after completion, but it is unknown if they were ever fitted. They were, however, manufactured and then placed in storage.

== Construction and career ==
Construction of the ship began on 13 June 1863 by S. G. Kudriavtsev at the state-owned Galeryni Island Shipyard in Saint Petersburg. Edinorog was laid down on 1 December 1863 and she was launched on 2 June 1864. She entered service on 27 July 1865 and cost a total of 1,141,800 rubles, almost double her contract cost of 600,000 rubles. The ship was assigned to the Baltic Fleet upon completion and she, and all of her sister ships except Latnik, made a port visit to Stockholm, Sweden in July–August 1865 while under the command of General Admiral Grand Duke Konstantin Nikolayevich.

Sometime after Edinorog was completed, an armored ring, 5 inches (127 mm) thick and 15 inches (381 mm) tall, was fitted around the base of the turret to prevent splinters from jamming it. Later, an armored, outward-curving bulwark was fitted around the top of the turret to protect any crewmen there. Three sponsons were later added, probably during the 1870s, to the upper portion of the turret. Each sponson, one above the gun ports and one on each side of the turret, mounted a light gun, probably a 1.75-inch (44 mm) Engstrem gun, for defense against torpedo boats. A fourth gun was mounted on a platform aft of the funnel when a hurricane deck was built between the funnel and the turret, also probably during the 1870s.

Little is known about the ship's career other than that she was laid up each winter when the Gulf of Finland froze. Edinorog was reclassified as a coast-defense ironclad on 13 February 1892 and turned over to the Port of Kronstadt for disposal on 6 July 1900, although she was not stricken until 17 August. The ship was converted into a mine storage hulk in 1912 and renamed Blokshiv No. 4 on 10 July of that year. She was abandoned by the Soviets in Helsingfors (Helsinki) when they were forced to withdraw from Finland in April 1918 according to the terms of the Treaty of Brest-Litovsk, but she was later returned by the Finns. The ship was redesignated as Blokshiv No. 2 on 1 January 1932 and survived World War II to be renamed BSh-2 on 16 May 1949. She was stricken on 27 June 1957 and turned over to the Kronstadt Yacht Club. Her ultimate fate is unknown.
