= Uragan-class monitor =

Early Russian ironclad vessel

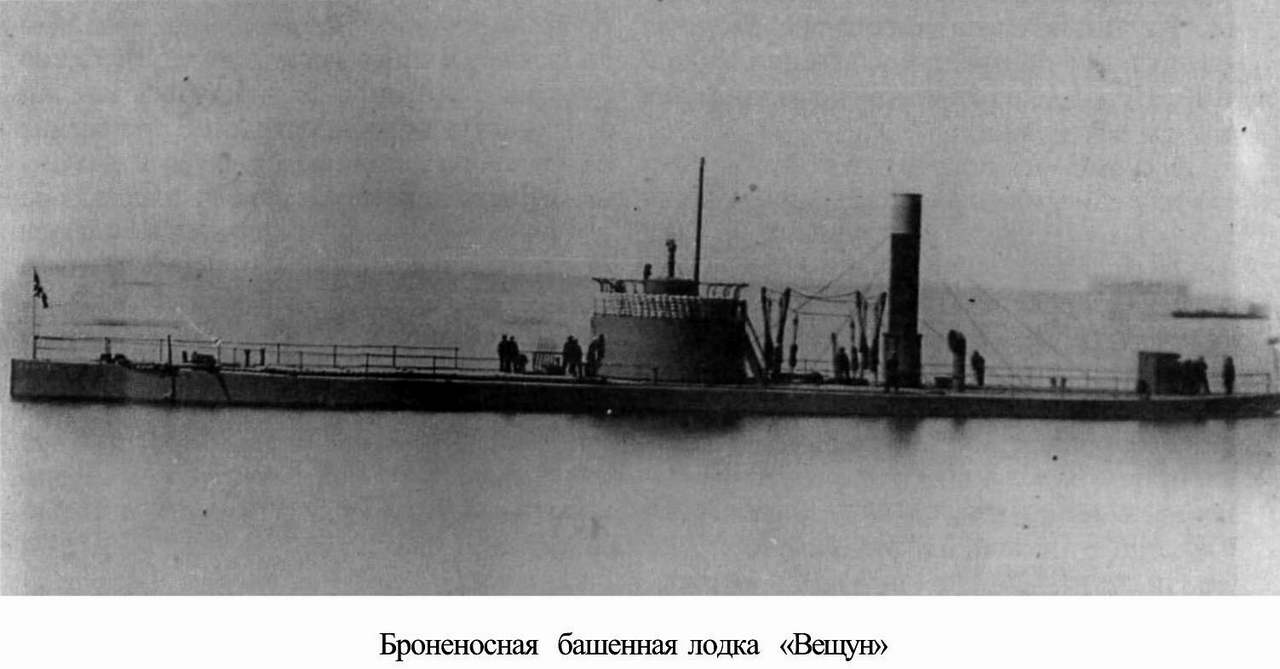
- Veschun («Вещун»)

Class overview
- Builders: New Admiralty yard; Galerniy Island yard; Carr and MacPherson; Nevsky factory; Cockerill & Co
- Operators: Imperial Russian Navy
- Preceded by: USS Monitor
- Cost: 1,155,000 rubles (average)
- Built: 1863–1865
- In commission: 1865–1900
- Completed: 10
- Scrapped: 9

General characteristics
- Type: Monitor
- Displacement: 1,500–1,600 long tons (1,500–1,600 t)
- Length: 201 ft (61.3 m)
- Beam: 46 ft (14.0 m)
- Draft: 10.16–10.84 ft (3.1–3.3 m)
- Installed power: 340–500 ihp (254–373 kW), 2 rectangular Morton boilers
- Propulsion: 1 shaft, 1 2-cylinder horizontal direct-acting steam engine
- Speed: 5–7.75 knots (9.26–14.35 km/h; 5.75–8.92 mph)
- Range: 1,440 nmi (2,670 km; 1,660 mi) at 6 knots (11 km/h; 6.9 mph)
- Complement: 96–110
- Armament: 1864: 2 × 9 in (229 mm) smoothbore guns; 1868: 2 × 15 in (381 mm) smoothbore Rodman guns; 1873: 2 × 9 in (229 mm) rifled guns
- Armor: Hull: 5 in (127 mm); Gun turret: 11 in (279 mm); Funnel base: 6 in (152 mm); Conning tower: 8–11 in (203–279 mm)

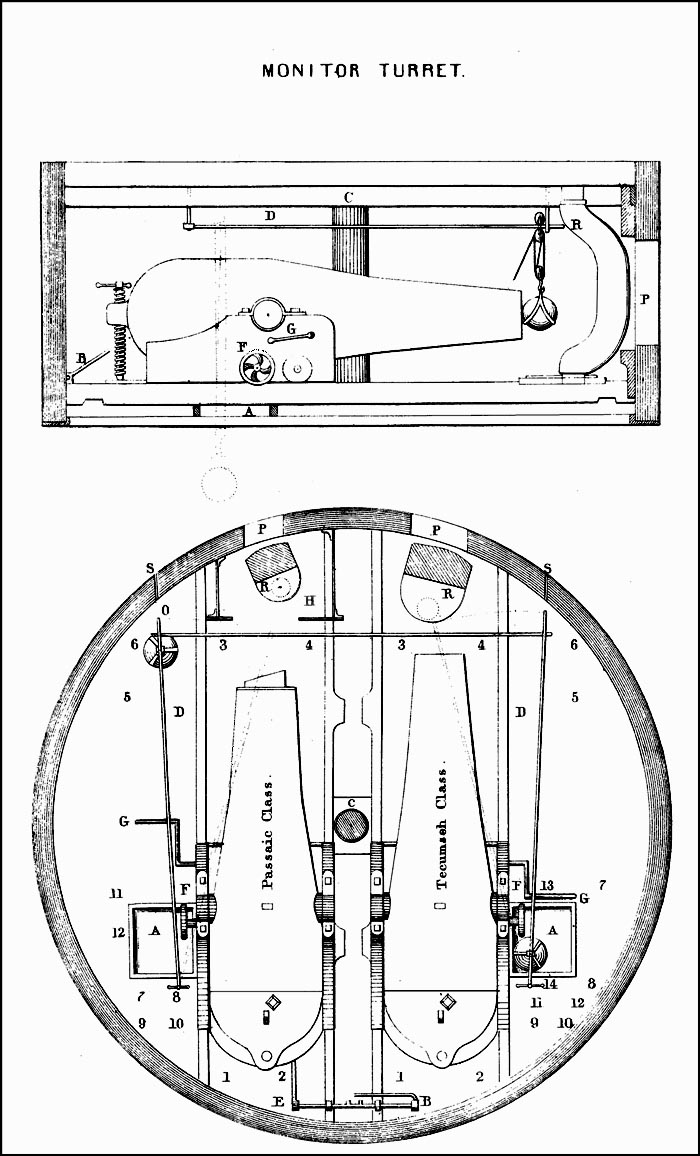
Comparison of the turrets of the Passaic / Uragan class (left) and the later Canonicus class (right). The 15-inch Rodman guns for the Uragan class were produced at the Aleksandrovsk gun factory in Petrozavodsk.

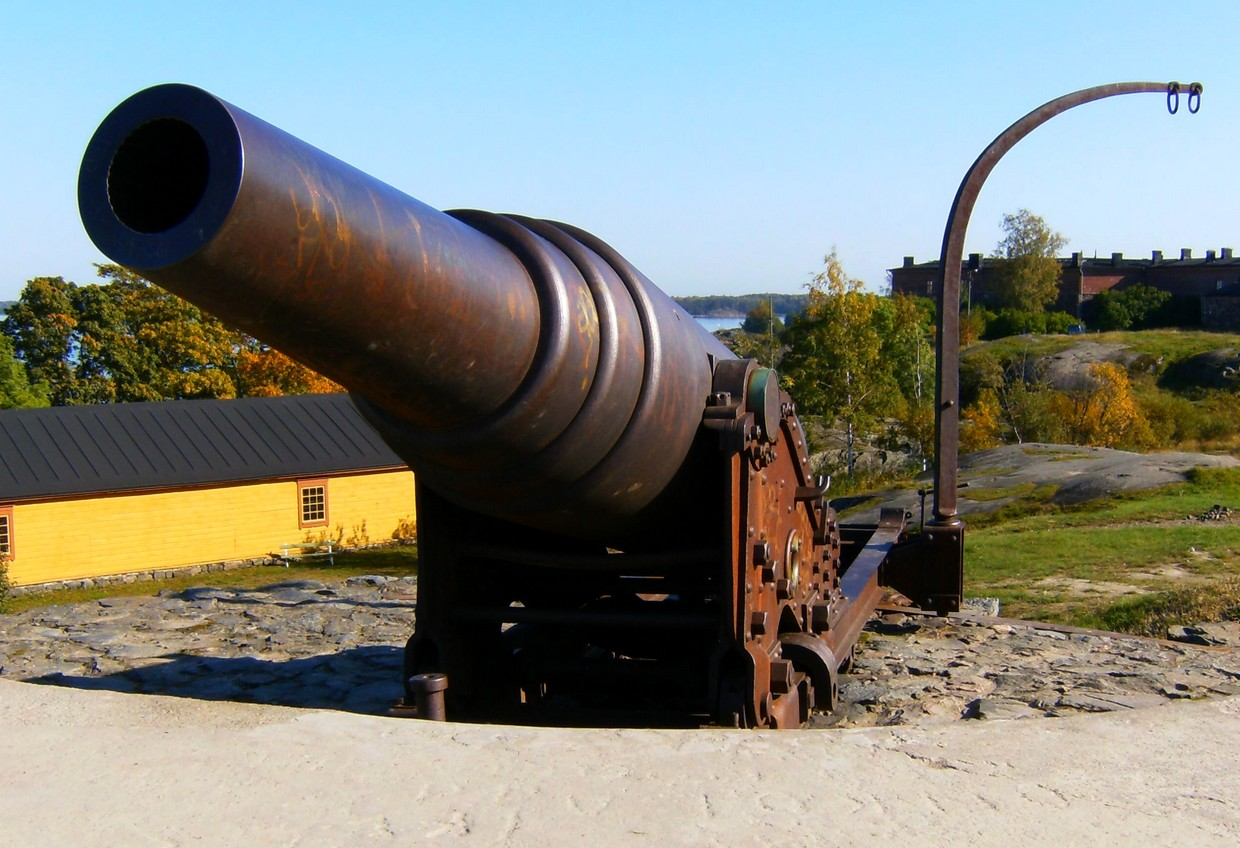
229 mm naval gun M1867 in Suomenlinna.

The Uragan class (also known as the Bronenosetz class, Russian: броненосец, "armor carrier" or "warship") was a class of monitors built for the Baltic Fleet of the Imperial Russian Navy. The ships were built to the plans of the American Passaic-class monitors, a design that was tested on a smaller scale on USS Monitor. A total of 10 ships were constructed at five different shipyards in Saint Petersburg, all entering service in 1865. The ships were among the first ironclad warships in the Russian Navy.

== Russian-American relations ==
During the American Civil War Americans mistook Russian defensive moves as an indicator of support for the Union cause.

Relations between Russia and Britain deteriorated further because of the British support — or what the Russians saw as sponsorship — of the Polish January Uprising of 1863.

If war between Russia and Britain were to begin, it was thought likely that British and French Naval forces would try to attack the Russian capital of Saint Petersburg on the Gulf of Finland. It was feared that this would be a repeat of the Baltic theatre of the Crimean War eight years previously, when the Allied steam-powered fleet had outgunned and outmaneuvered the Russian sailing fleet. Russians calculated, that in a battle in the confined waters of the Baltic the Russian wooden ships would be worthless, but could do more damage to the British in distant seas. With the wooden fleet gone, Russia would have no naval protection of her home waters.

== Russian monitor program ==
A Russian monitor program was started as soon as news of the Battle of Hampton Roads reached Europe.

The Merrimack struck in the side not so much a corvette at anchor, but the bureaucratic administration of the Union States and England, that slumber under the protection of the wooden walls of their ships, and only built their nations' few iron vessels as goodies to pamper their children. Now, the question of timber ships is finally resolved in the most stupid and improvident minds.

— Rear-Admiral G. Butakov, "Order number 4", May 30, 1862

Naval architect N. Artseulov was sent to America to join Russian naval attaché, Captain (later Rear Admiral) Stepan Stepanovich Lessovsky and to assess at first hand the advantages and disadvantages of John Ericsson's monitors. He returned on 16 March 1863, with detailed drawings and specifications of the Passaic class.

On 11 March 1863 the Russian Admiralty approved a program to build ten armored vessels based on the Passaic design. The decision to use the American plans was based on the lack of time, money and experience in building armored vessels. A larger monitor, Smerch («Смерч»), with two turrets of a design by Cowper Phipps Coles was also approved and launched in 1864. One of the benefits of the Ericsson turret design, as opposed to the British design by Coles, was the layered construction from 1-inch (25 mm) armored plate. The Coles design required slabs of 5-inch (114.3 mm) thickness. This armor could not be produced in any Russian plant, and in Europe, only John Brown & Co in Sheffield, England, was producing armored plate of this thickness and of the required quality.

=== Construction ===
Two of the ships were built by the state-owned New Admiralty yard, the others were ordered from privately owned shipyards. The Galerniy Island yard, Carr and MacPherson and the Nevsky factory (owned by Colonel PF Semyannikov and Retired Lieutenant VA Poletika) each produced two ships. Two ships were prefabricated in Belgium by Cockerill & Co and assembled in Kronstadt. All ships were laid down in late 1863 and launched in 1864. Some of the turrets and steam engines were produced at the Izhorsky Zavod state factory, and some by the Baird Works. Iron armor for the ships was first ordered form John Brown & Co in Sheffield, but they cited difficulties in meeting the demand. Instead most of the 1 inch armor plate needed for the ships was produced by Russian forges.

The cost of the Russian-built ships was around 570 thousand rubles for each ship. The two Belgian ships cost 619,000 silver rubles.

== Armament ==
In their first eight years of operation, the monitors were equipped with three different types of artillery pieces. Procurement efforts for all three types were started at the same time in 1863. An order was placed in 1863 with the Krupp factories in Germany for 9 inch smoothbore guns with steel barrels; these were initially used to arm the monitors.

At the same time, Artillery specialist Filemon N. Pestich was sent to America along with Artseulov and Lessovsky to acquire gun technology. He returned in 1864 with technology for the production of 15-inch smoothbore Dahlgren guns, the type in use on the American Passaics. A new gun factory was established in Petrozavodsk in Russian Karelia. Production of Dahlgren guns was immediately started at the Aleksandrovsk gun factory, with the first 15-inch gun cast on 2 January 1864, The first 15-inch guns were installed on the monitors by 1868, but they only became available for all ships in 1869. Unlike on the American sister ships, mixed armaments of 15 inch and smaller guns were not used.

Also in 1863 development of a rifled gun started with the help of Krupp technology. The Obukhov State Plant was founded in St. Petersburg to produce guns based on Krupp designs. The new 9-inch (229 mm) breech-loading rifled guns become known as the 229 mm cannon M1867. The ships were rearmed with these guns starting in 1873.

As the monitors were hulked in 1900 the rifled M1867 guns were removed; they later served as coastal artillery in Peter the Great's Naval Fortress. Some of the guns still exist on the sea fortress of Suomenlinna in Helsinki.

== Ships ==
New Admiralty yard

- Uragan («Ураган», Hurricane) - Laid up and decommissioned 1900.
- Tifon («Тифон», Typhon) - Laid up 1900, hulked as mine depot 1909, broken up in the 1920s.

Galerniy Island yard

- Strelets («Стрелец», Strelets) - Laid up 1900, hulked as floating workshop late 1910s, hull remains to the present day.
- Edinorog («Единорог», Unicorn) - Laid up 1900, hulked as mine depot 1909, broken up in the 1950s, served in Vladivostok.

Carr and MacPherson

- Bronenosets («Броненосец», Armadillo) - Hulked as coal barge and decommissioned 1900.
- Latnik («Латник», Cuirassiers) - Hulked as coal barge and decommissioned 1900.

Nevsky factory

- Lava («Лава», Lava) - Laid up 1900, hulked as hospital barge 1911, broken up in the 1920s.
- Perun («Перун», Perun) - Laid up 1900, sank 1921, broken up in 1925.

Cockerill & Co

- Veschun («Вещун», Pythoness) - Hulked as coal barge and decommissioned 1900.
- Koldun («Колдун», Sorcerer) - Hulked as coal barge and decommissioned 1900.

== See also ==
- List of ironclads of Russia

== Bibliography ==
- Eklof, Ben; Bushnell, John; Zakharova, Larisa Georgievna (1994). "The Russian Navy and the Problem of Technological Transfer". Russia's Great Reforms, 1855-1881. Bloomington, Indiana: Indiana University Press. ISBN 0-253-20861-0.
- Амирханов, Л.И. (1998). Артиллерия российских мониторов (in Russian). St. Petersburg: Gangut.
- Lysenok, V. I. (1985). Броненосные башенные лодки типа «Ураган». Судостроение (in Russian) (3): 69–72.
- McLaughlin, Stephen (2012). "Russia's American Monitors: The Uragan Class". In John Jordan (ed.). Warship 2012. London: Conway. pp. 98–112. ISBN 978-1-84486-156-9.
- Gribovsky, V.Yu.; Chernikov, I.I (1996). "Chapter I Броненосцы береговой обороны в российском флоте" [Coastal defense battleships in the Russian Navy]. title=Броненосец "Адмирал Ушаков" [Battleship "Admiral Ushakov"] (in Russian).
- G. Smirnov; V. Smirnov (1983). Триумф брони над снарядом. Моделист-Конструктор (in Russian) (10). Moscow: 15–16. ISBN 3-540-42334-6. Archived from the original on 2009-01-23.
- G. Smirnov; V. Smirnov (1984). Броня, башни и тара. Моделист-Конструктор (in Russian) (1). Moscow: 31–32. ISBN 3-540-42334-6. Archived from the original on 2009-01-23.
- The civil war in the U.S. and Russia: Гражданская война в США и Россия. Северная Америка. Век девятнадцатый (North America. Nineteenth Century) (in Russian).
- Victor Galynya (2000). Первые русские мониторы (сборник статей и документов). St. Petersburg.
- "Coastal defense gunboats". Archive photographs of ships of Russian and Soviet Navy (in Russian).
