= USS Miantonomoh (1863) =

Lead ship of Miantonomoh-class

History

United States
- Name: Miantonomoh
- Namesake: Miantonomoh
- Builder: Brooklyn Navy Yard
- Laid down: 1862
- Launched: 15 August 1863
- Commissioned: 18 September 1865
- Decommissioned: 28 July 1870
- Fate: Scrapped, 1874

General characteristics
- Class & type: Miantonomoh-class monitor
- Displacement: 3,401 long tons (3,456 t)
- Length: 250 ft (76.2 m) (o/a)
- Beam: 53 ft 8 in (16.4 m)
- Draft: 14 ft 9 in (4.5 m)
- Depth: 16 ft (4.9 m)
- Installed power: 4 Martin water-tube boilers; 1,400 ihp (1,044 kW)
- Propulsion: 2 shafts; 2 HRCR steam engines
- Speed: 9 knots (17 km/h; 10 mph)
- Complement: 150 officers and enlisted men
- Armament: 2 × twin 15 in (381 mm) smoothbore Dahlgren guns
- Armor: Side: 5 in (127 mm); Turrets: 10 in (254 mm); Pilothouse: 8 in (203 mm); Deck: 1.5 in (38 mm)

The first USS Miantonomoh was the lead ship of her class of four ironclad monitors built for the United States Navy during the American Civil War. Completed after the war ended in May 1865, the ship made one cruise off the East Coast before she began a voyage across the North Atlantic in May 1866 to conduct a lengthy showing the flag mission in Europe. Miantonomoh was decommissioned upon her return in 1867, but was reactivated two years later and assigned to the North Atlantic Squadron before decommissioning again in 1870. The monitor was sold for scrap three years later as part of a scheme where the Navy Department evaded the Congressional refusal to order new ships by claiming that the Civil War-era ship was being repaired while building a new monitor of the same name.

== Description ==
The Miantonomoh class was designed by John Lenthall, Chief of the Bureau of Construction and Repair, although the ships varied somewhat in their details. Miantonomoh was 250 feet (76.2 m) long overall, had a beam of 53 feet 8 inches (16.4 m) and had a draft of 14 feet 9 inches (4.5 m). The ship had a depth of hold of 16 feet (4.9 m), a tonnage of 1,564 tons burthen and displaced 3,401 long tons (3,456 t). Her crew consisted of 150 officers and enlisted men.

Miantonomoh was powered by a pair of horizontal-return connecting-rod steam engines designed by the Engineer-in-Chief of the Navy, Benjamin F. Isherwood. Each engine drove a propeller shaft using steam generated by four Martin vertical water-tube boilers. The engines were rated at 1,400 indicated horsepower (1,044 kW) and gave the ship a top speed of 9 knots (17 km/h; 10 mph). She was designed to carry 300 long tons (305 t) of coal.

=== Armament and armor ===
Her main battery consisted of four smoothbore, muzzle-loading, 15-inch (381 mm) Dahlgren guns mounted in two twin-gun turrets, one each fore and aft of the single funnel. Each gun weighed approximately 43,000 pounds (20,000 kg). They could fire a 350-pound (158.8 kg) shell up to a range of 2,100 yards (1,900 m) at an elevation of +7°.

The sides of the hull of the Miantonomoh-class ships were protected by five layers of 1-inch (25 mm) wrought-iron plates that tapered at their bottom edge down to total of 3 inches (76 mm), backed by 12–14 inches (305–356 mm) of wood. The armor of the gun turret consisted of ten layers of one-inch plates and the pilot house had eight layers. The ship's deck was protected by armor 1.5 inches (38 mm) thick. The bases of the funnel and the ventilator were also protected by unknown thicknesses of armor. A 5-by-15-inch (127 by 381 mm) soft iron band was fitted around the base of the turrets to prevent shells and fragments from jamming them as had happened during the First Battle of Charleston Harbor in April 1863.

== Construction and career ==
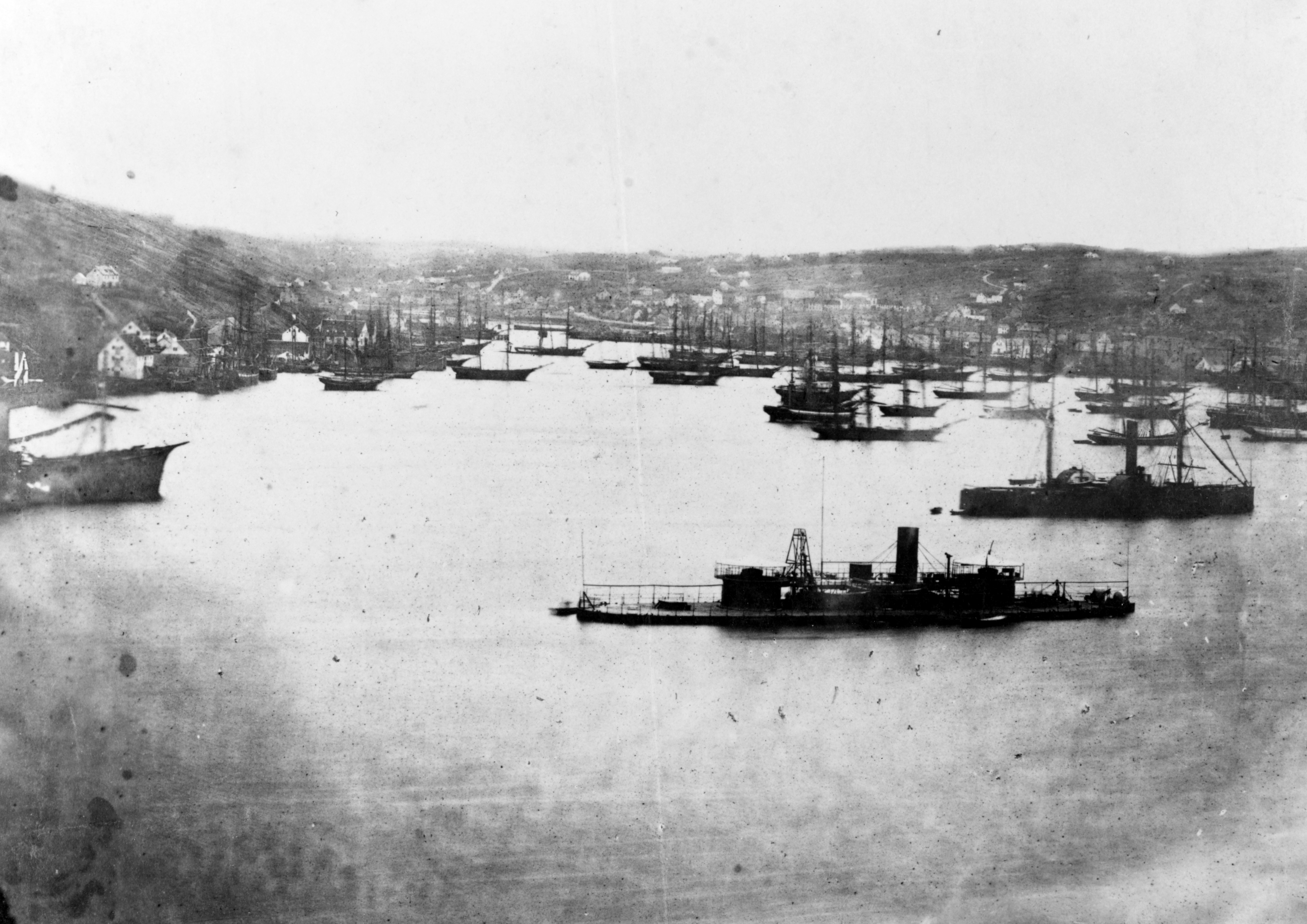
Miantonomoh (center right) and her escorts Augusta (left) and Ashuelot (right) in St John's, Newfoundland, May–June 1866

Miantonomoh, named after the Narragansett chief, Miantonomoh, was laid down in 1862 at the Brooklyn Navy Yard, New York, launched on 15 August 1863, and commissioned on 15 September 1865 with Commander Daniel Ammen in command. Miantonomoh was assigned to the North Atlantic Squadron and made a brief cruise along the East Coast before she was decommissioned at the Washington Navy Yard. In late April 1866 she steamed to New York and was overhauled there in preparation for a voyage across the North Atlantic on a diplomatic visit to Russia. Now under the command of Commander John Beaumont, the monitor departed on 6 May escorted by the paddle steamers Augusta and Ashuelot. After a brief stop at Halifax, Nova Scotia, the ships reached St. John's, Newfoundland, on 23 May. There Miantonomoh embarked the Assistant Secretary of the Navy, Gustavus Fox on 3 June and the British naval attaché, Captain John Bythesea, VC.

The nominal reason for the voyage was an instruction by Secretary of the Navy Gideon Welles that Fox was to deliver to Tsar Alexander II of Russia a copy of a Joint Resolution of the Congress which expressed "deep regret" at the recent attempt by Dmitry Karakozov on the Tsar's life and congratulations on his escape from harm. The voyage was also intended to reciprocate lengthy visits by squadrons of the Imperial Russian Navy to New York and San Francisco during the Civil War and to enhance the prestige of the United States among the European powers. Welles also requested that Fox collect information on naval developments in Europe.

Departing St. John's on 5 June, the three ships crossed the Atlantic in less than 11 days. Fox described the first ocean crossing of an ironclad monitor as "a pleasant trip." During much of the voyage she was towed by Augusta "as a matter of convenience and precaution rather than necessity", although a shortage of coal may have played a role. Bythesea thought that the weather was almost too fine to test the monitor's seaworthiness and found that her interior was very dry. After reaching Queenstown on 16 June, where the ships were met by the British broadside ironclads Achilles and Black Prince, they proceeded to Portsmouth, arriving on the 23rd. Miantonomoh was an object of great curiosity to the British public and newspaper reporters were allowed aboard to publish their impressions. Beaumont, Bythesea and Fox gave a guided tour to the Board of Admiralty and the inventor of a different type of armored turret, Captain Cowper Coles, on 29 June before her departure for France. The ship's Dahlgrens were fired for the visitors and the onlooking spectators.

Fox debarked at Cherbourg for unproductive talks with Emperor Napoleon III. Miantonomoh returned to England on 7 July to host more visitors, including the Prince of Wales and his brother Alfred, Duke of Edinburgh. "The success of her reception in England typified her subsequent visits to other European nations during the next several months." Miantonomoh steamed to Denmark later that month where she was inspected by King Christian IX and his family before departing for Russia at the end of the month. The monitor rendezvoused with a large contingent of the Imperial Russian Navy, including the armored frigates Sevastopol and Ne Tron Menia, the monitor Smerch and four Uragan-class monitors at Helsingfors (Helsinki), Finland, and escorted her to Kronshtadt where she arrived 5 August. During that time Miantonomoh was viewed by the Tsar, his family, and leading Russian naval officers, including the naval architect Rear Admiral Andrei Popov, who later traveled aboard the ship from Hamburg, Prussia, to Cherbourg.

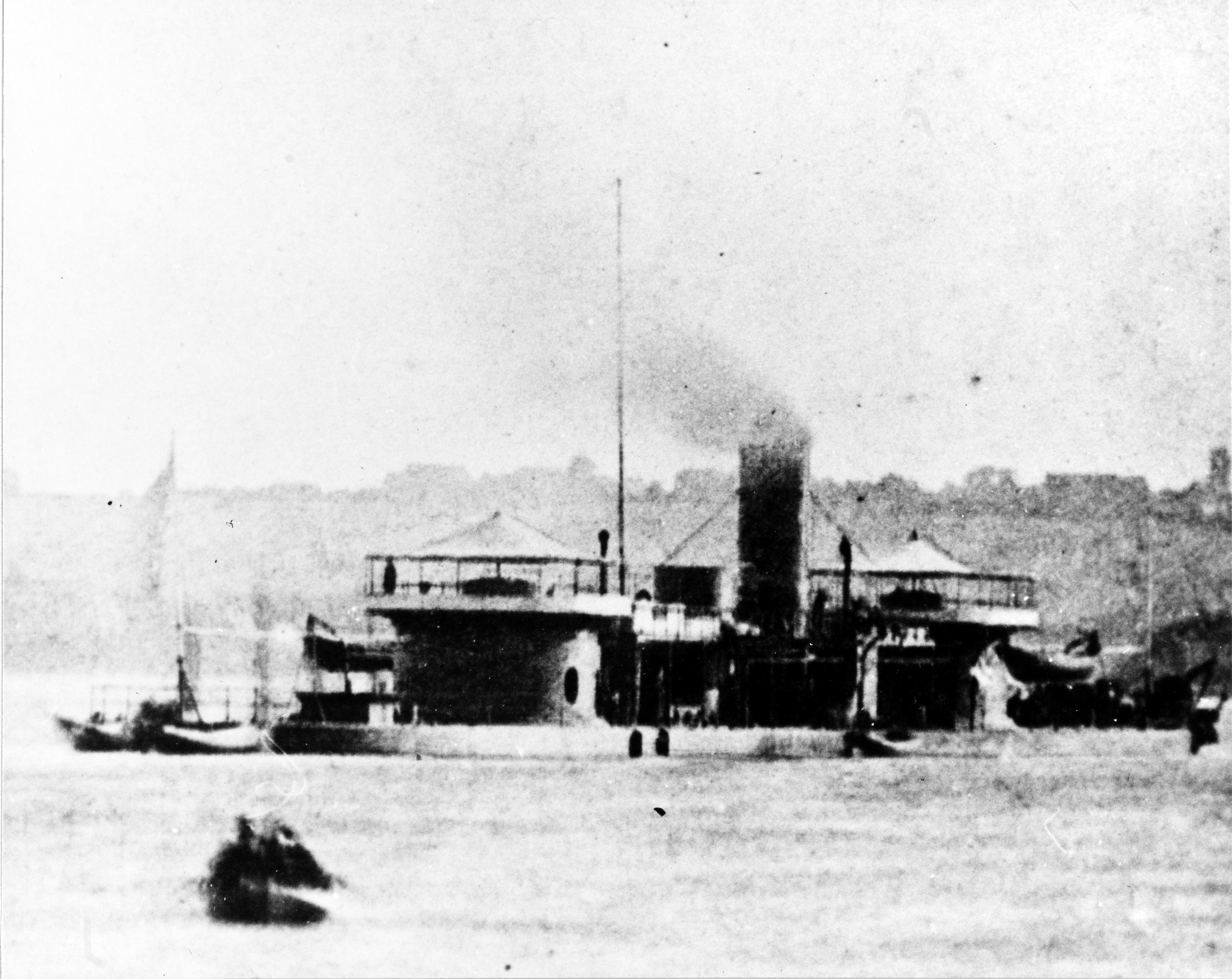
Miantonomoh in Kiel, Germany, 1866

Miantonomoh ferried Fox to Stockholm, Sweden, in mid-September and then to Kiel, Prussia, on 1 October. Over the next six months the monitor called at French, Portuguese, Spanish, and Italian ports before departing British Gibraltar on 15 May 1867 in company with Augusta. They steamed via the Canary and Cape Verde Islands, Caribbean ports and the Bahamas, before the monitor arrived at Philadelphia on 22 July, thus completing a cruise of more than 17,700 nautical miles (32,800 km; 20,400 mi). Miantonomoh was decommissioned there four days later.

With Commander Robert Shufeldt in command, Miantonomoh was recommissioned on 15 November 1869 for service with the North Atlantic Squadron. Two months later the ship was tasked to join a small group of ships under the command of Admiral David Farragut that escorted the British ironclad Monarch to Portland, Maine, as it ferried the body of the philanthropist George Peabody from London to his final resting place. She remained on active duty until 28 July 1870 when she was decommissioned at Boston, Massachusetts. Although Congress was informed by the Navy Department that the Civil War-era ship was being repaired, a new iron-hulled monitor of the same name was built with repair money and the proceeds of her sale in 1875 because Congress refused to fund any new construction at this time.
