= Russian monitor Latnik =

Russian Uragan-class monitor

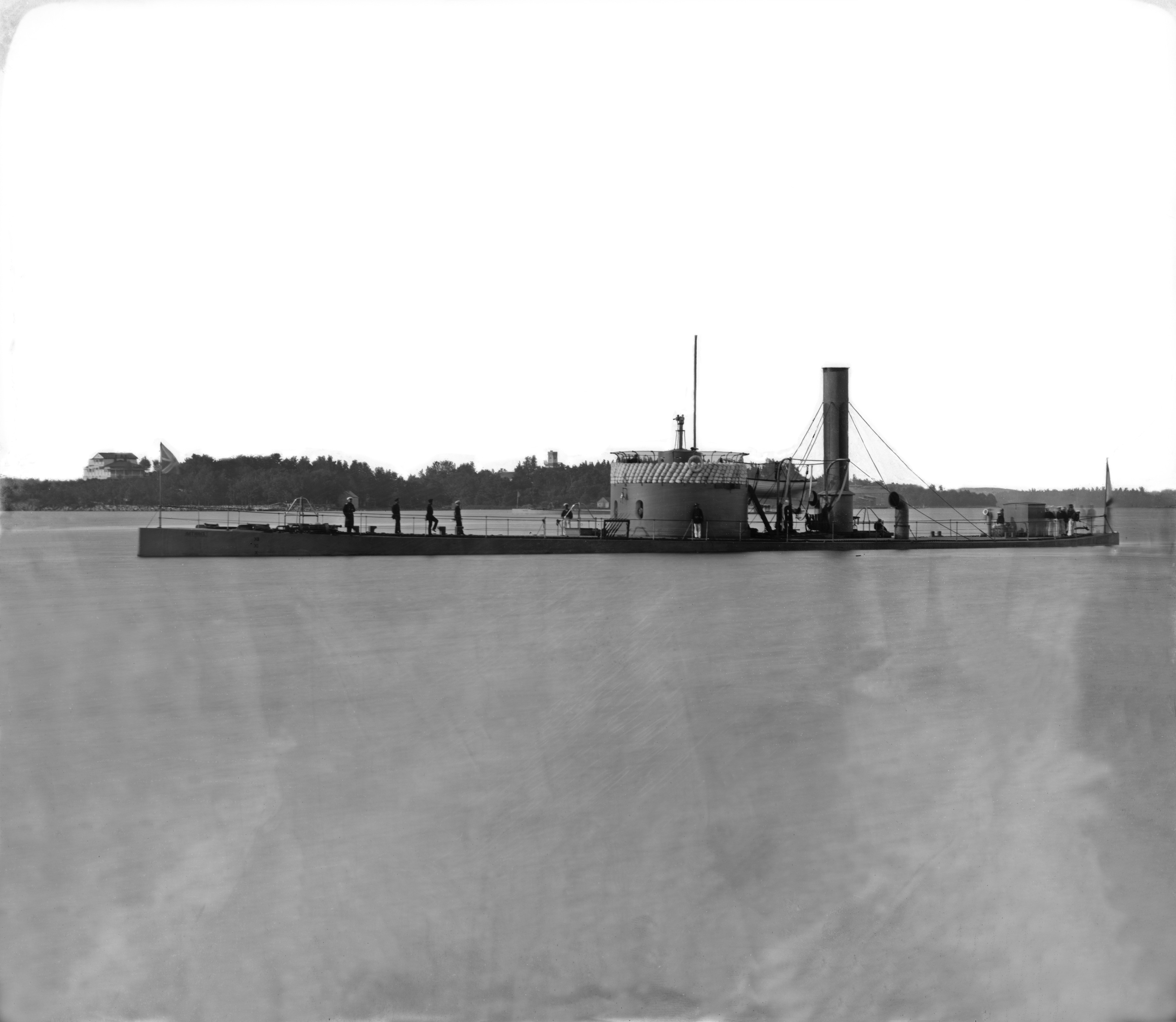
- Latnik, about 1870, Helsinki, Finland

History

Russian Empire
- Name: Latnik (Латник)
- Namesake: Cuirassiers
- Ordered: 23 March 1863 (Note: All dates used in this article are New Style.)
- Builder: Carr and MacPherson, Saint Petersburg
- Cost: 1,148,000 rubles
- Laid down: 24 December 1863
- Launched: 22 March 1864
- In service: 14 July 1865
- Out of service: 6 July 1900
- Reclassified: As coastal defense ship, 13 February 1892
- Stricken: 17 August 1900
- Fate: Converted into a coal barge, 1903, and scrapped around 1918

General characteristics
- Class & type: Uragan-class monitor
- Displacement: 1,500–1,600 long tons (1,524–1,626 t)
- Length: 201 ft (61.3 m)
- Beam: 46 ft (14.0 m)
- Draft: 10.16–10.84 ft (3.1–3.3 m)
- Installed power: 340–500 ihp (254–373 kW); 2 rectangular Morton boilers
- Propulsion: 1 shaft, 1 × 2-cylinder horizontal direct-acting steam engine
- Speed: 5 knots (9.3 km/h; 5.8 mph)
- Range: 1,440 nmi (2,670 km; 1,660 mi) at 6 knots (11 km/h; 6.9 mph)
- Complement: 96–110
- Armament: 1865: 2 × 9 in (229 mm) smoothbore guns; 1868: 2 × 15 in (381 mm) smoothbore Rodman guns; 1873: 2 × 9 in (229 mm) rifled guns
- Armor: Hull: 5 in (127 mm); Gun turret: 11 in (279 mm); Funnel base: 6 in (152 mm); Conning tower: 8 in (203 mm)

Latnik (Russian: Латник) was an Uragan-class monitor built for the Imperial Russian Navy in the mid-1860s. The design was based on the American Passaic-class monitor, but was modified to suit Russian engines, guns and construction techniques. She was one of two ships of the class to be built in Belgium and assembled in Russia. Spending her entire career with the Baltic Fleet, the ship was only active when the Gulf of Finland was not frozen, but very little is known about her service. She was stricken in 1900 from the Navy List, converted into a coal barge in 1903 and renamed Barzha No. 38 and then Barzha No. 326. Abandoned by the Soviets in Finland in 1918, the ship was later scrapped by the Finns.

== Description ==
Latnik was 201 feet (61.3 m) long overall, with a beam of 46 feet (14.0 m) and a draft of 10.16–10.84 feet (3.1–3.3 m). She displaced 1,500–1,600 long tons (1,524–1,626 t), and her crew numbered eight officers and 88 enlisted men in 1865. They numbered 10 officers and 100 crewmen in 1877.

The ship was fitted with a two-cylinder, horizontal direct-acting steam engine built by Carr and MacPherson of Saint Petersburg. It drove a single propeller using steam that was provided by two rectangular boilers. Specific information on the output of the ship's engine has not survived, but it ranged between 340–500 indicated horsepower (254–373 kW) for all the ships of this class. During Latnik's sea trials on 31 May 1865, she reached a maximum speed of 5 knots (9.3 km/h; 5.8 mph), the slowest ship in the class. She carried a maximum of 190 long tons (193 t) of coal, which gave her a theoretical endurance of 1,440 nmi (2,670 km; 1,660 mi) at 6 knots (11 km/h; 6.9 mph).

Latnik was designed to be armed with a pair of 9-inch (229 mm) smoothbore muzzle-loading guns purchased from Krupp of Germany and rifled in Russia, but the rifling project was seriously delayed and the ship was completed with nine-inch smoothbores. These lacked the penetration power necessary to deal with ironclads and they were replaced by license-built 15-inch (380 mm) smoothbore muzzle-loading Rodman guns in 1867–68. The Rodman guns were replaced around 1876 with the originally intended nine-inch rifled guns.

All of the wrought-iron armor that was used in the Uragan-class monitors was in 1-inch (25 mm) plates, just as in the Passaic-class ships. The side of the ship was entirely covered with three to five layers of armor plates, of which the three innermost plates extended 42 inches (1.1 m) below the waterline. This armor was backed by a wooden beam that had a maximum thickness of 36 inches (914 mm). The gun turret was protected by eleven layers of armor and the pilothouse above it had eight layers of armor. Curved plates six layers thick protected the base of the funnel up to a height of 7 feet (2.1 m) above the deck. Unlike their predecessors, the Uragans were built without deck armor to save weight, but Latnik's deck was reinforced by the addition of 0.5-inch (12.7 mm) armor plates after completion.

== Career ==
Construction of the ship began on 17 June 1863 at the Carr and MacPherson Shipyard in Saint Petersburg. Latnik was laid down on 24 December 1863 and she was launched on 22 March 1864. She entered service on 14 July 1865 and cost a total of 1,148,000 rubles, almost double her contract cost of 600,000 rubles. The ship was assigned to the Baltic Fleet upon completion. For some reason, she was the only ship of the class not to make a port visit to Stockholm, Sweden in July–August 1865. She suffered some sort of hull damage in September, but the details are not known.

Sometime after Latnik was completed, an armored ring, 5 inches (127 mm) thick and 15 inches (381 mm) tall, was fitted around the base of the turret to prevent splinters from jamming it. Later, an armored, outward-curving bulwark was fitted around the top of the turret to protect any crewmen there. Three sponsons were later added, probably during the 1870s, to the upper portion of the turret. Each sponson, one above the gun ports and one on each side of the turret, mounted a light gun, probably a 1.75-inch (44 mm) Engstrem gun, for defense against torpedo boats. A fourth gun was mounted on a platform aft of the funnel when a hurricane deck was built between the funnel and the turret, also probably during the 1870s.

Little is known about the ship's career other than that she was laid up each winter when the Gulf of Finland froze. Latnik was reclassified as a coast defense ironclad on 13 February 1892 and turned over to the Port of Kronstadt for disposal on 6 July 1900, although she was not stricken until 17 August. During 1903, the ship was converted into a coal barge by the removal of her turret, her side armor, and its wooden backing, and by the division of her hull into three holds. She was redesignated as Barzha No. 38 and, in 1914, Barzha No. 326. She was abandoned by the Russians in Helsingfors (Helsinki) when they were forced to withdraw from Finland in April 1918 according to the terms of the Treaty of Brest-Litovsk and was later broken up there.
