= Passaic-class monitor =

Early US ironclad warship type

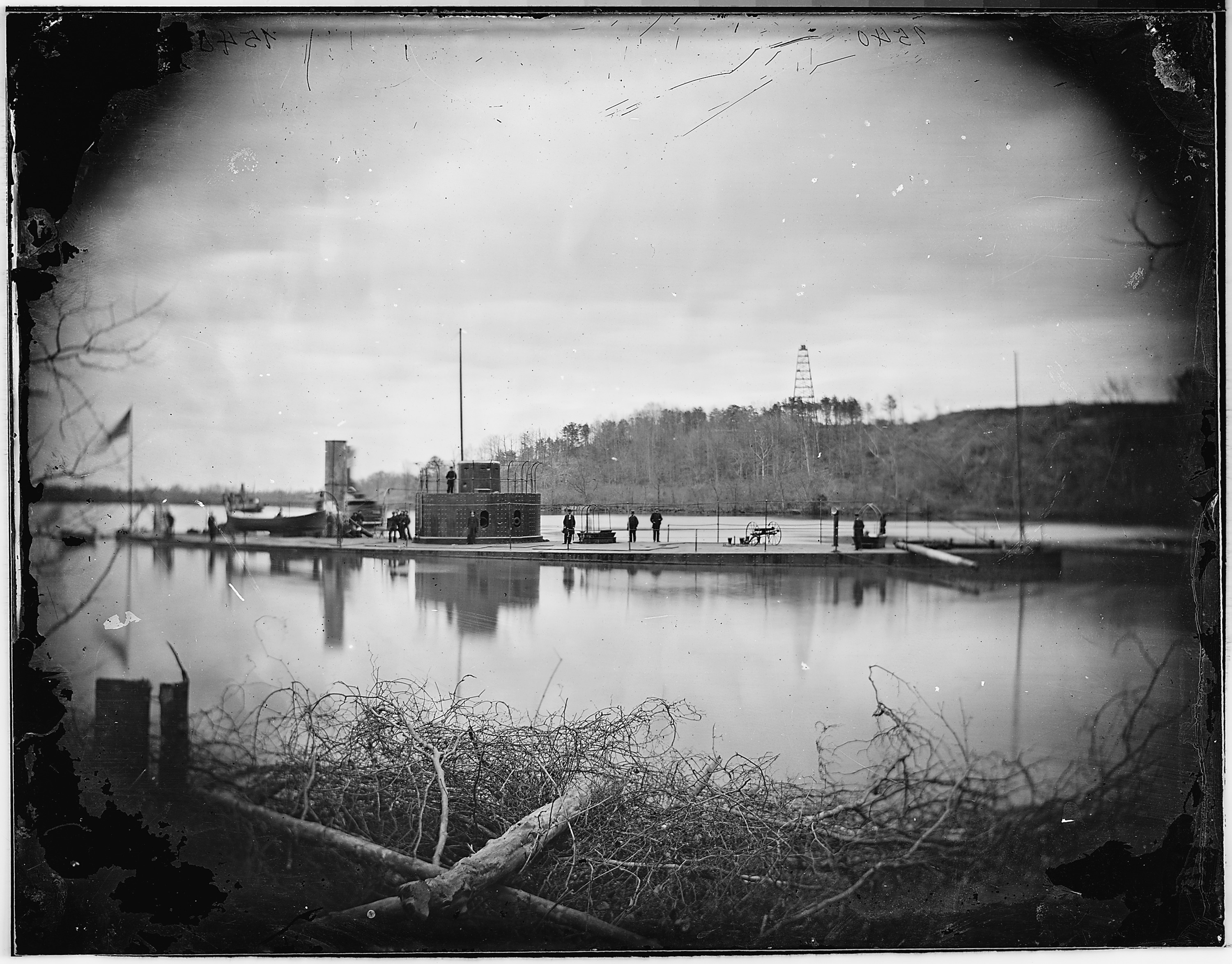
- USS Lehigh on the James River

Class overview
- Builders: Continental Iron Works (Greenpoint, NY); Harlan & Hollingsworth; Harrison Loring; Reaney, Son & Archbold; Donohue, Ryan & Secor; Atlantic Iron Works
- Preceded by: USS Monitor
- Succeeded by: Canonicus class
- Subclasses: Uragan class
- In commission: 25 November 1862 – 1899
- Completed: 10
- Lost: 2

General characteristics
- Type: Monitor
- Displacement: 1,335 tons
- Tons burthen: 844 (bm)
- Length: 200 ft (61 m) overall
- Beam: 46 ft (14 m)
- Draught: 10 ft 6 in (3.20 m)
- Propulsion: 2 Martin boilers, 1-shaft Ericsson vibrating lever engine, 320 ihp (240 kW)
- Speed: 7 knots (13 km/h; 8.1 mph)
- Complement: 75
- Armament: 1 × 15-inch (380 mm) smoothbore Dahlgren gun; 1 × 11-inch (280 mm) smoothbore Dahlgren gun; Lehigh, Patapsco: 1 × 15-inch (380 mm) smoothbore Dahlgren gun; 1 × 8-inch (200 mm) Parrott rifle; Camanche: 2 × 15-inch (380 mm) smoothbore Dahlgren guns
- Armor: Iron; Side: 3–5 in (76–127 mm); Turret: 11 in (280 mm); Deck: 1 in (25 mm)

The Passaic-class ironclad monitors of the U.S. Navy saw service in the U.S. Civil War and the Spanish–American War. The class was an improved version of the USS Monitor equipped with a 15-inch Dahlgren gun in place of one of the 11-inch guns.

== Design ==
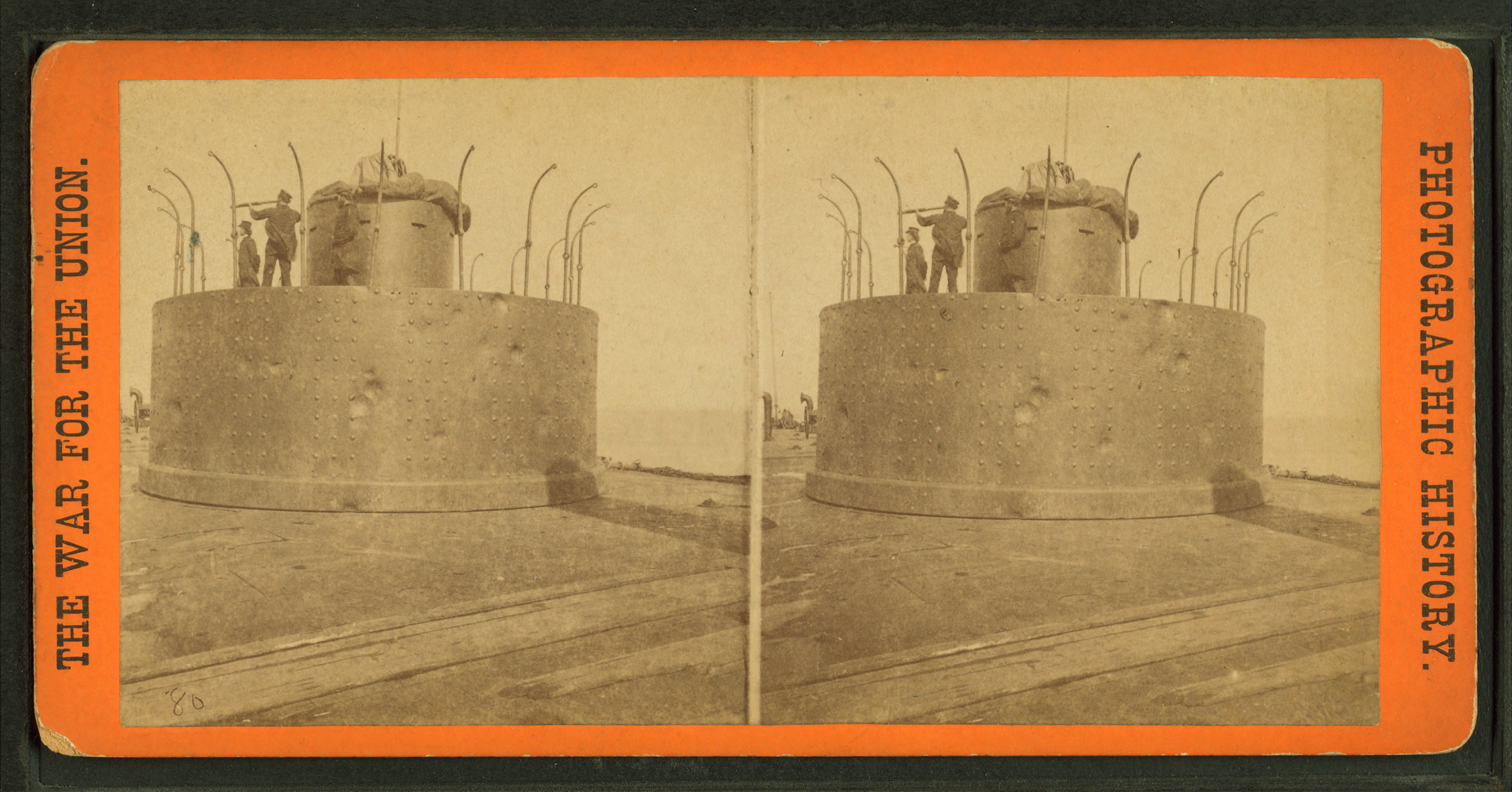
Picture by Taylor and Huntington as being the turret of USS Monitor; in fact the turret is of a Passiac-class monitor-possibly that of USS Lehigh

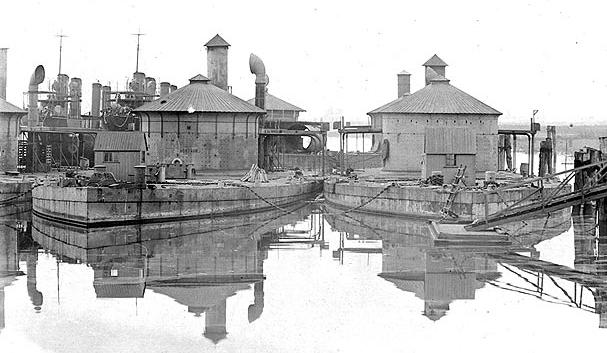
USS Lehigh and USS Montauk in the Philadelphia Navy Yard, circa 1902

Naval architect and engineer John Ericsson designed the Passaic-class warships, drawing upon lessons learned from the first USS Monitor, which he also designed. The Passaic monitors were larger than the original Monitor and had their pilothouses atop the turret, rather than near the bow. This allowed a wider field of view and easier communications between the captain, pilot and crew. The shape of the hull was an improvement; a fuller and rounder lower hull, far more boat-like than that of the Monitor, and with a less pronounced overhang. The Passaic class featured an 18 ft (5.5 m) funnel and improved ventilation. In combination, the significant hydrodynamic refinements and improved draught to the boilers resulted in a one-knot speed increase over the prototype monitor, despite the Passaic having a lower specific power than Monitor (Passaic being almost 400 tons heavier and yet with the same 320ihp-rated machinery).

Having observed the new 15-inch Rodman cannon in fortifications and disappointed with the performance of the 11-inch Dahlgren versus CSS Virginia, Assistant Secretary of the Navy Gustavus Fox required the new monitors to be equipped with at least one gun of 15-inch caliber, resulting in rush production of a new 15-inch Dahlgren. The turret was 21 ft (6.4 m) in diameter inside with the 15 in (380 mm) gun mounted flush because the muzzle diameter was too large for the turret opening. The large volume of propellant gases released inside the turret required the addition of a "smoke box" at the muzzle in the interior of the turret. As a result, the 15 in gunners could not see their targets and had to aim with the 8 in (200 mm) or 11 in (280 mm) guns. Lehigh had her 11-inch smoothbore replaced with an 8-inch Parrott rifle. Passaic also had this modification by July 1863, and, eventually, all surviving members of this class had an additional 15-inch smoothbore added. Later improvements included an additional 50 tons of deck plating over the magazines and machinery spaces as well as rings fitted around the turret and pilot houses to prevent their pivoting machinery from being jammed by shot.

== Ships in class ==
Warships of Passaic class included:

- Passaic
- Montauk
- Nahant
- Patapsco
- Weehawken
- Sangamon
- Catskill
- Nantucket
- Lehigh
- Camanche

The first ship of the class was named for the city of Passaic, New Jersey.

== See also ==
- Uragan-class monitor, an Imperial Russian Navy monitor type built to the plans of the American Passaic class.
