= French ironclad Gauloise =

Provence-class armored frigates

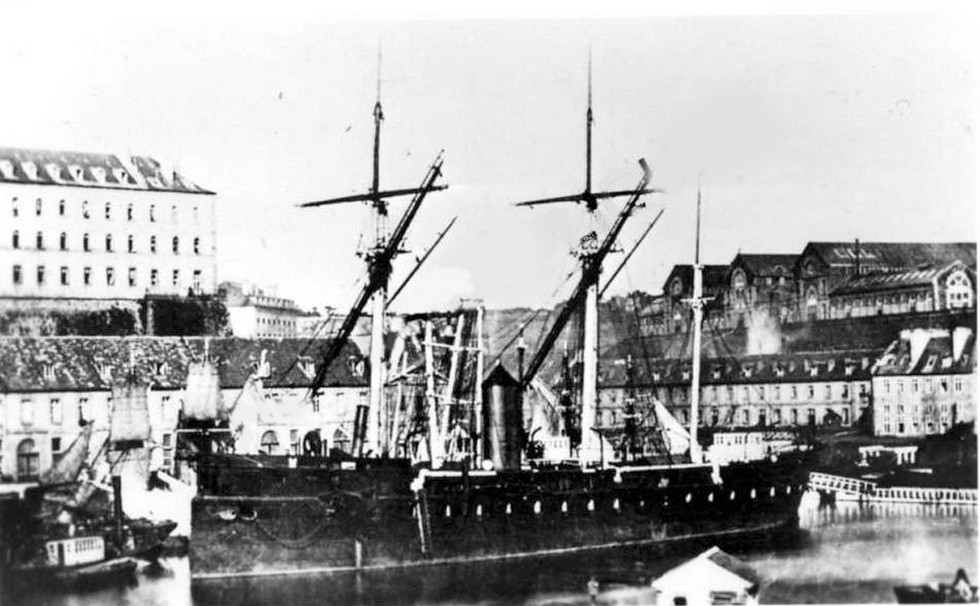
- Gauloise before 1883

History

France
- Name: Gauloise
- Namesake: Gauloise
- Ordered: 16 November 1860
- Builder: Arsenal de Brest
- Laid down: 24 January 1861
- Launched: 26 April 1865
- Commissioned: 5 December 1867
- Stricken: 13 October 1883
- Fate: Scrapped, 1884–1886

General characteristics (as completed)
- Class & type: Provence-class ironclad frigate
- Displacement: 5,810 t (5,720 long tons)
- Length: 82.9 m (272 ft) (o/a)
- Beam: 17.06 m (56 ft)
- Draft: 8.4 m (27 ft 7 in) (deep load)
- Installed power: 8 boilers; 3,200 PS (2,400 kW)
- Propulsion: 1 shaft, 1 HRCR-steam engine
- Sail plan: Barque-rig
- Speed: 14.5 knots (26.9 km/h; 16.7 mph)
- Range: 2,410 nautical miles (4,460 km; 2,770 mi) at 10 knots (19 km/h; 12 mph)
- Complement: 579–594
- Armament: 4 × 240 mm (9.4 in) rifled muzzle-loading (RML) guns; 7 × 194 mm (7.6 in) smoothbore guns; 6 × 164.7 mm (6.5 in) RML guns
- Armor: Belt: 150 mm (5.9 in); Battery: 110 mm (4.3 in); Conning tower: 100 mm (3.9 in)

The French ironclad Gauloise was one of 10 Provence-class armored frigates built for the French Navy (Marine Nationale) during the 1860s. Commissioned in 1867, she was initially assigned to the Northern Squadron (Escadre du Nord) and usually served as a flagship. The ironclad played a minor role in the Franco-Prussian War of 1870–1871, blockading the Baltic and North Sea coasts of Prussia.

The ship was repeatedly placed in and out of reserve during the 1870s and spent the rest of her career in the Mediterranean, serving with the Squadron of Evolutions (Escadre d'évolutions) of the Mediterranean Squadron (Escadre de la Méditerranée) and later the Levant Naval Division (Division navale du Levant). Gauloise was condemned in 1883 and subsequently scrapped.

== Design and description ==
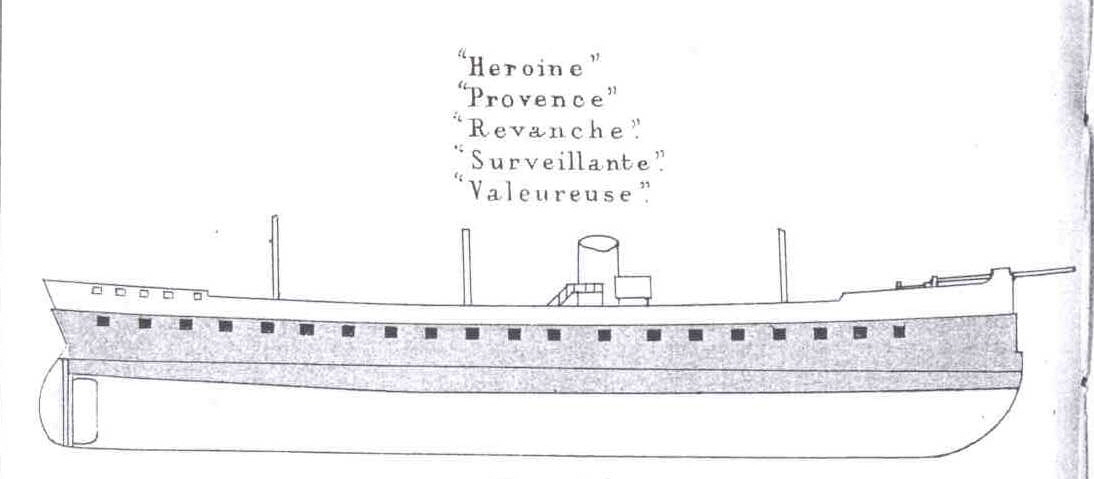
Right elevation line drawing of the ships; the shaded area shows the armor protection

The Provence class was designed as an enlarged version of the Gloire-class ironclads with thicker armor, more powerful guns, and better seakeeping qualities. The ships had an overall length of 82.9 meters (272 ft), a beam of 17.06 meters (56 ft), and a draft of 8.4 meters (27 ft 7 in) at deep load. They displaced 5,810 metric tons (5,720 long tons). Their crew numbered 579–594 officers and enlisted men.

When the French discovered that the British ironclad Warrior had reached 14.3 knots (26.5 km/h; 16.5 mph) during her sea trials, they decided to add an extra cylinder to the engine of the five ships still under construction, including Gauloise, in an attempt to achieve 14.5 knots (26.9 km/h; 16.7 mph). She had a single three-cylinder horizontal-return connecting-rod steam engine that drove the propeller shaft, using steam provided by eight boilers. The engine was rated at 1,000 nominal horsepower or 3,200 metric horsepower (2,400 kW). The ship reached a speed of 15.1 knots (28.0 km/h; 17.4 mph) from 3,894 PS (2,864 kW) during her sea trials. The Provence-class ships carried enough coal to allow them to steam for 2,410 nautical miles (4,460 km; 2,770 mi) at a speed of 10 knots (19 km/h; 12 mph). They were fitted with a three-masted barque rig that had a sail area of 1,960 square meters (21,100 sq ft).

=== Armament and protection ===
The main battery of the Provence-class ships was intended to be thirty 164.7-millimeter (6.5 in) Modèle 1858–60 rifled muzzle-loading (RML) guns, but this was changed to a mixed armament of four 240-millimeter (9.4 in) Modèle 1864 RMLs and six 194-millimeter (7.6 in) Modèle 1864 smoothbore muzzle-loading guns on the gundeck. Positioned on the quarterdeck and the forecastle were another 194 mm smoothbore and six 164.7 mm Modèle 1858 RMLs, at least some of which served as chase guns.

From the upper deck down to below the waterline, the sides of the ships were completely armored with 150 mm (5.9 in) of wrought iron, backed by 750 mm (29.5 in) of wood. The sides of the battery itself were protected with 110 mm (4.3 in) of armor that was backed by 610 mm (24 in) of wood. The conning tower's sides consisted of 100-millimeter (3.9 in) armor plates.

== Construction and service ==
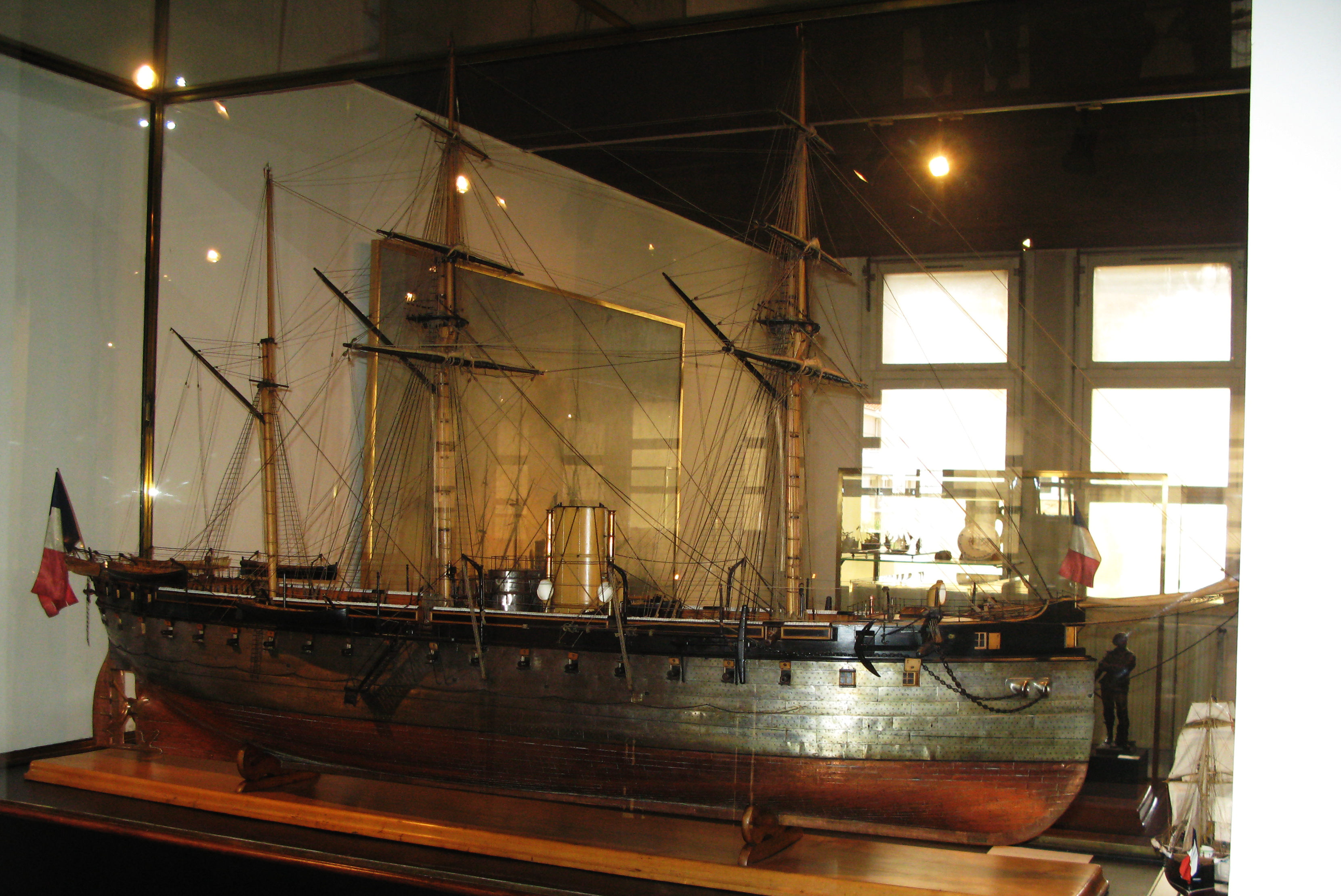
A scale model of sister ship Flandre

Gauloise, named after an inhabitant of Gaul, was ordered on 16 November 1860 from the Arsenal de Brest, laid down on 24 January 1861 and launched on 26 April 1865. She was commissioned for trials on 12 April 1867, completed that same month, but was not definitively commissioned (armement définitif) until 5 December. Gauloise was assigned to the Ironclad Division (Division cuirassée) of the Northern Squadron, based in Cherbourg. On 24 July 1868, she became the flagship of Rear Admiral (contre-amiral) Charles de Dompierre d'Hornoy.

When the Franco-Prussian War began on 19 July 1870, the ship was the flagship of Rear Admiral Alexandre Dieudonné who became the second-in-command to Vice Admiral (vice-amiral) Édouard Bouët-Willaumez. Bouët-Williaumez's squadron was tasked to blockade German ports in the Heligoland Bight and departed Cherbourg on 24 July and, failing to find any German ships, proceeded to Danish waters to wait for further instructions. Bouët-Williaumez was ordered on 2 August to split his forces with half, including Gauloise, proceeding into the Baltic Sea to blockade the Prussian ports there under his command and the others to return to the Bight. The strong Prussian coastal defenses prevented any attack by the French ships, but their presence severely inhibited German shipping. Bouët-Willaumez was ordered to return to Cherbourg on 16 September where Gauloise joined the ships blockading the Bight. By then the Prussians were besieging Paris and many of the trained gunners aboard the squadron were transferred to defend the city. The squadron resumed the blockade with reduced crews although Gauloise was reduced to reserve at Brest in November.

The ship was reactivated in 1872 and became the flagship of Rear Admiral Jean Hugueteau-Chaillé, commander of the Squadron of Evolutions of the Mediterranean Squadron, and was detached to patrol the Levant. She returned to reserve in 1873 and remained at Brest in that status until she was recommissioned on 2 December 1875. Gauloise became the flagship of Rear Admiral Benjamin Jaurès on 21 February 1876. By October Rear Admiral Ernest Fauque de Jonquières had relieved Jaurès, but the ship was reduced to reserve the following month. Returning to active service on 18 April 1877, Gauloise was reassigned to the Squadron of Evolutions and became the flagship of Rear Admiral Laurent Lejeune. The following year, the ship was reassigned to the Levant Naval Division; by 1879, Lejeune had hauled down his flag and she became a private ship. Gauloise was placed in reserve in Cherbourg in 1880, condemned on 13 October 1883, and was demolished in 1884–1886.

== Bibliography ==
- de Balincourt, Captain & Vincent-Bréchignac, Captain (1975a). "The French Navy of Yesterday: Ironclad Frigates: Second Group – Provence Type". F.P.D.S. Newsletter. III (2): 9–13. OCLC 41554533.
- de Balincourt, Captain & Vincent-Bréchignac, Captain (1975b). "The French Navy of Yesterday: Ironclad Frigates, Part IV". F.P.D.S. Newsletter. III (4): 26–30. OCLC 41554533.
- Campbell, N. J. M. (1979). "France". In Chesneau, Roger & Kolesnik, Eugene M. (eds.). Conway's All the World's Fighting Ships 1860–1905. Greenwich, UK: Conway Maritime Press. pp. 282–333. ISBN 0-8317-0302-4.
- Gille, Eric (1999). Cent ans de cuirassés français [A Century of French Battleships] (in French). Nantes: Marines. ISBN 2-909-675-50-5.
- Roberts, Stephen S. (2021). French Warships in the Age of Steam 1859–1914: Design, Construction, Careers and Fates. Barnsley, UK: Seaforth Publishing. ISBN 978-1-5267-4533-0.
- Silverstone, Paul H. (1984). Directory of the World's Capital Ships. New York: Hippocrene Books. ISBN 0-88254-979-0.
- Wilson, H. W. (1896). Ironclads in Action: A Sketch of Naval Warfare From 1855 to 1895, with Some Account of the Development of the Battleship in England. Vol. 1. Boston: Little, Brown. OCLC 902936108.
- Winfield, Rif & Roberts, Stephen S. (2015). French Warships in the Age of Sail, 1786–1861. Barnsley, UK: Seaforth Publishing. ISBN 978-1-84832-204-2.
