= French ironclad Magnanime =

French ship

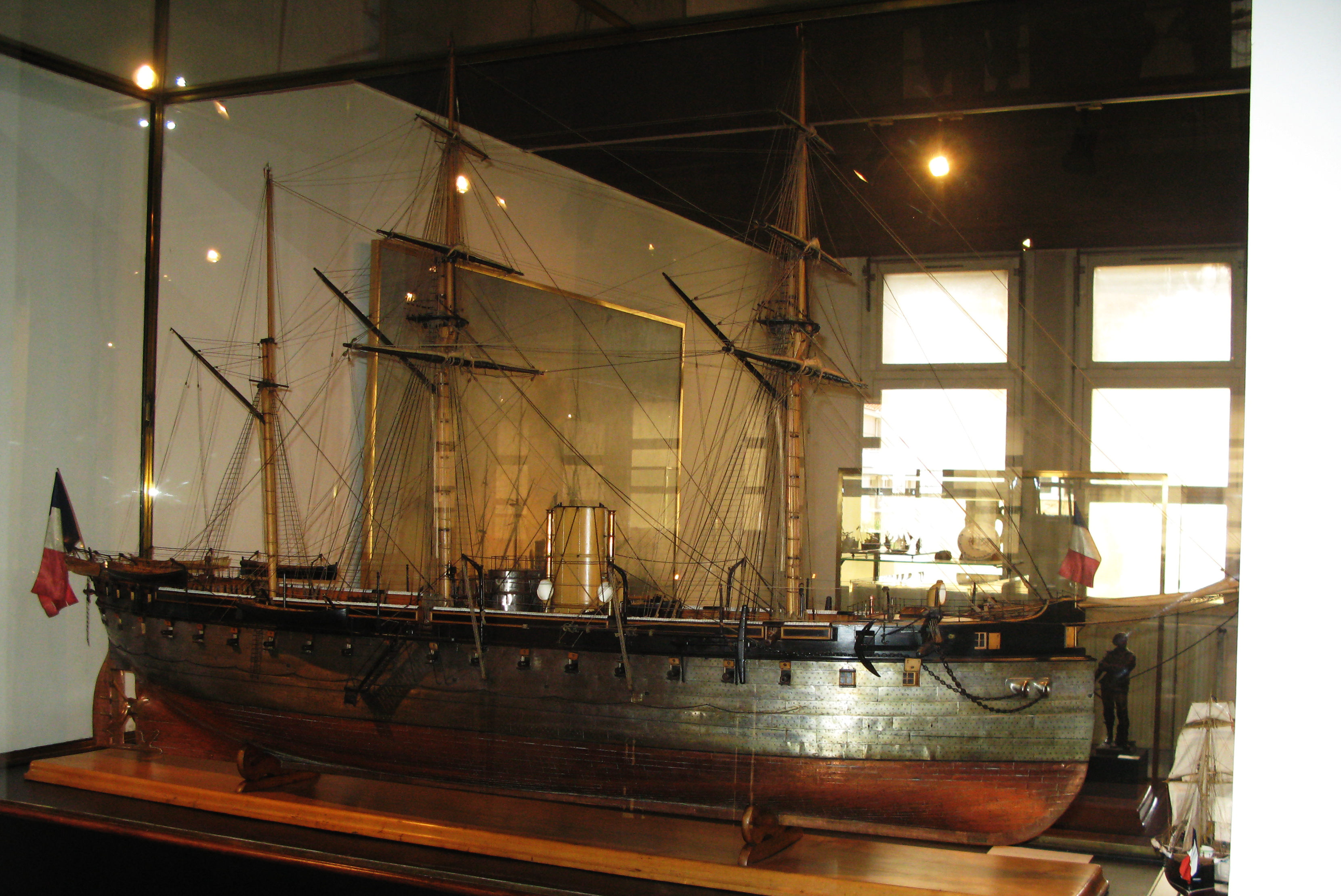
- A scale model of sister ship Flandre

History

France
- Name: Magnanime
- Namesake: Magnanimous
- Ordered: 16 November 1860
- Builder: Arsenal de Brest
- Laid down: 27 February 1861
- Launched: 19 August 1864
- Commissioned: 1 November 1865
- Decommissioned: 1879
- Stricken: 19 June 1882
- Fate: Scrapped, 1885

General characteristics (as built)
- Class & type: Provence-class ironclad frigate
- Displacement: 5,810 t (5,720 long tons)
- Length: 82.9 m (272 ft) (o/a)
- Beam: 17.06 m (56 ft)
- Draft: 8.4 m (27 ft 7 in) (deep load)
- Installed power: 8 boilers; 3,200 PS (2,400 kW)
- Propulsion: 1 shaft, 1 compound-expansion steam engine
- Sail plan: Barque-rig
- Speed: 14.5 knots (26.9 km/h; 16.7 mph)
- Range: 2,410 nautical miles (4,460 km; 2,770 mi) at 10 knots (19 km/h; 12 mph)
- Complement: 579–594
- Armament: 4 × 240 mm (9.4 in) rifled muzzle-loading (RML) guns; 7 × 194 mm (7.6 in) smoothbore guns; 6 × 164.7 mm (6.5 in) RML guns
- Armor: Belt: 150 mm (5.9 in); Battery: 110 mm (4.3 in); Conning tower: 100 mm (3.9 in)

The French ironclad Magnanime was one of 10 Provence-class ironclads built for the French Navy (Marine Nationale) during the 1860s. Commissioned in 1865, she was initially assigned to the Northern Squadron (Escadre du Nord), but was soon transferred to the Mediterranean Squadron (Escadre de la Méditerranée), often serving as a flagship. The armored frigate played a minor role in the Franco-Prussian War of 1870–1871, blockading the North Sea coast of Prussia. Magananime was reduced to reserve after the war, but was reactivated in 1875 and assigned to the Mediterranean Fleet. The ship was decommissioned in 1878 and was stricken from the navy list in 1882. She was scrapped in 1885.

== Design and description ==
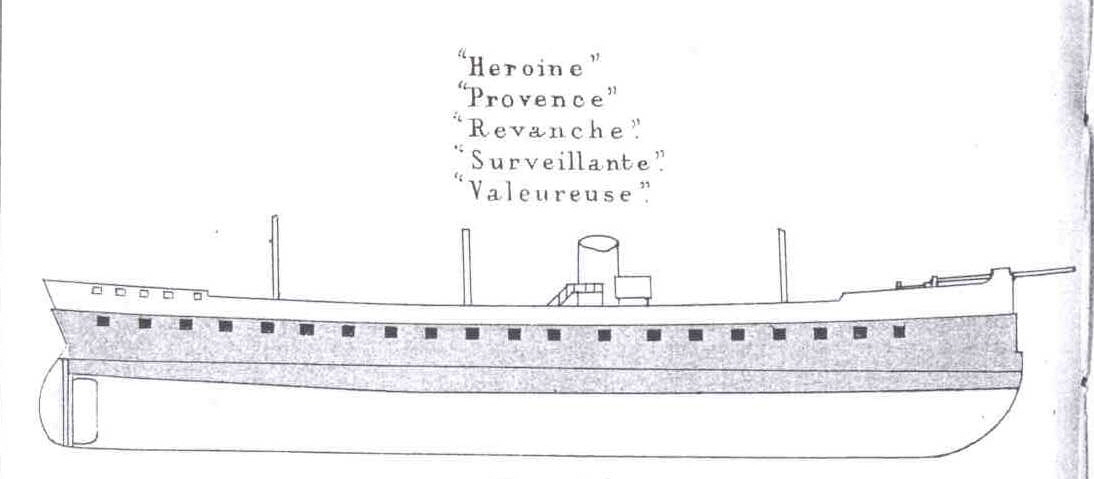
Right elevation line drawing of the class; the shaded area shows the armor protection

The Provence class was designed as an enlarged version of the Gloire-class ironclads with thicker armor, more powerful guns, and better seakeeping qualities. The ships had an overall length of 82.9 meters (272 ft), a beam of 17.06 meters (56 ft), and a draft of 8.4 meters (27 ft 7 in) at deep load. They displaced 5,810 metric tons (5,720 long tons). Their crew numbered 579–594 officers and enlisted men.

When the French discovered that the British ironclad Warrior had reached 14.3 knots (26.5 km/h; 16.5 mph) during her sea trials, they decided to add an extra cylinder to the engine of the five ships still under construction in an attempt to achieve 14.5 knots (26.9 km/h; 16.7 mph). In Magnanime and her sister ships Valeureuse and Savoie, the middle cylinder received the steam provided by eight boilers first which then expanded into the two outer cylinders, making the engine an early form of a compound-expansion steam engine. The engine drove the single propeller shaft and was rated at 1,000 nominal horsepower or 3,200 metric horsepower (2,400 kW). The Provence class carried enough coal to allow them to steam for 2,410 nautical miles (4,460 km; 2,770 mi) at a speed of 10 knots (19 km/h; 12 mph). They were fitted with a three-masted barque rig that had a sail area of 1,960 square meters (21,100 sq ft).

=== Armament and protection ===
The main battery of the Provence-class ships was intended to be thirty 164.7-millimeter (6.5 in) Modèle 1858–60 rifled muzzle-loading (RML) guns, but this was changed to a mixed armament of four 240-millimeter (9.4 in) Modèle 1864 RMLs and six smoothbore 194-millimeter (7.6 in) Modèle 1864 muzzle-loading guns on the gundeck. Positioned on the quarterdeck and the forecastle were another 194 mm smoothbore and six 164.7 mm Modèle 1858 RMLs, at least some of which served as chase guns. By 1869–1870, Magnanime's armament consisted of eight 240 mm Modèle 1864 RMLs on the gundeck and four 194 mm Modèle 1864 smoothbores as chase guns on the quarterdeck and forecastle.

From the upper deck down to below the waterline, the sides of the ships were completely armored with 150 mm (5.9 in) of wrought iron, backed by 750 mm (29.5 in) of wood. The sides of the battery itself were protected with 110 mm (4.3 in) of armor that was backed by 610 mm (24 in) of wood. The conning tower's sides consisted of 100-millimeter (3.9 in) armor plates.

== Construction and service ==
Magnanime (Magnanimous) was ordered on 16 November 1860 from the Arsenal de Brest, laid down on 27 February 1861 and launched on 19 August 1864. She was commissioned for trials on 1 November 1865, and was definitively commissioned (armement définitif) on 7 July 1866. Magananime was initially assigned to the Ironclad Division (Division cuirassée) of the Northern Squadron, based in Cherbourg, but then transferred to the Mediterranean Squadron. In September–October 1866 Magnanime, her sisters Flandre and Héroïne, and the ironclad Magenta participated in fleet maneuvers and comparative gunnery trials. Together with Flandre and Magenta, Magnanime escorted the transports ferrying French troops home after the collapse of the Second French intervention in Mexico in 1867. By 1 April 1870, the ship was assigned to the Squadron of Evolutions (Escadre d'évolutions) and was the flagship of Vice Admiral (vice-amiral) Martin Fourichon.

When the Franco-Prussian War began on 19 July, the French had lost track of a squadron of four Prussian ironclads so the Mediterranean Squadron, including Magnanime, was deployed to Oran, French Algeria, to intercept them in case they attempted to interdict the troop convoys between French North Africa and Metropolitan France. When they received word that the Prussian ships had returned to Germany, the squadron sailed to Brest to prepare to blockade the coast of Prussia. Magnanmie remained Fourichon's flagship and his squadron was tasked to blockade German ports in the Heligoland Bight. It departed Brest on 8 August and arrived off the British-owned island of Heligoland three days later. The neutral British denied the French permission to re-coal there and the ships were forced to perform it at sea under dangerous conditions. Bad weather and a series of storms beginning in late August prevented the squadron from coaling and the ships were forced to return to France in early September. Vice Admiral Louis Henri de Gueydon relieved Fourichon on 6 September. By then the Prussians were besieging Paris and many of the trained gunners aboard the squadron's ships were transferred to defend the city. The squadron resumed the blockade with reduced crews until December when smaller ships took it over.

Magananime spent 1872–1875 in reserve at Toulon. By 21 October 1876 she was the flagship of Rear Admiral Ernest de Jonquières, commander of the Squadron of Evolutions of the Mediterranean Fleet. He had been relieved by Rear Admiral Pierre Foullioy by 27 October 1877. The ship was paid off the following year and condemned in 1879. Magananime was stricken from the navy list on 19 June 1882 and was broken up in 1885.

== Bibliography ==
- de Balincourt, Captain & Vincent-Bréchignac, Captain (1975). "The French Navy of Yesterday: Ironclad Frigates: Second Group – Provence Type". F.P.D.S. Newsletter. III (2): 9–13. OCLC 41554533.
- Campbell, N. J. M. (1979). "France". In Chesneau, Roger & Kolesnik, Eugene M. (eds.). Conway's All the World's Fighting Ships 1860–1905. Greenwich, UK: Conway Maritime Press. pp. 282–333. ISBN 0-8317-0302-4.
- Gille, Eric (1999). Cent ans de cuirassés français [A Century of French Battleships] (in French). Nantes: Marines. ISBN 2-909-675-50-5.
- Roberts, Stephen S. (2021). French Warships in the Age of Steam 1859–1914: Design, Construction, Careers and Fates. Barnsley, UK: Seaforth Publishing. ISBN 978-1-5267-4533-0.
- Roche, Jean-Michel (2005). Dictionnaire des bâtiments de la flotte de guerre française de Colbert à nos jours [Dictionary of French Warships from Colbert to Today] (in French). Vol. Tome I: 1671–1870. Toulon: Group Retozel-Maury Millau. ISBN 978-2-9525917-0-6. OCLC 165892922.
- Silverstone, Paul H. (1984). Directory of the World's Capital Ships. New York: Hippocrene Books. ISBN 0-88254-979-0.
- Wilson, H. W. (1896). Ironclads in Action: A Sketch of Naval Warfare From 1855 to 1895, with Some Account of the Development of the Battleship in England. Vol. 1. Boston: Little, Brown. OCLC 902936108.
- Winfield, Rif & Roberts, Stephen S. (2015). French Warships in the Age of Sail, 1786–1861. Barnsley, UK: Seaforth Publishing. ISBN 978-1-84832-204-2.
