= French ironclad Revanche =

Provence-class ship

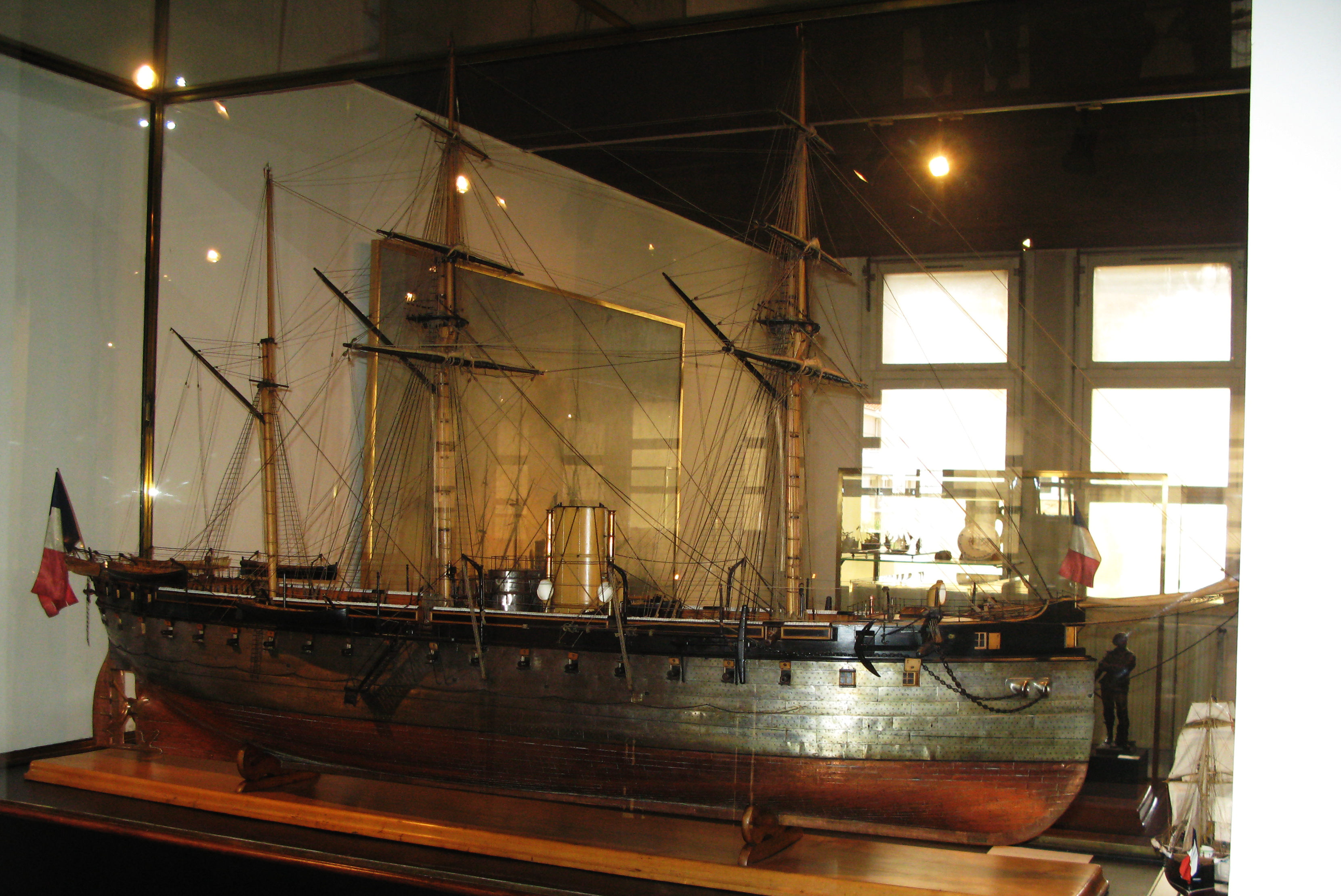
- A scale model of sister ship Flandre

History

France
- Name: Revanche
- Namesake: Revenge
- Builder: Arsenal de Toulon
- Laid down: March 1861
- Launched: 28 December 1865
- Commissioned: 1 May 1867
- Stricken: 10 January 1893
- Fate: Scrapped, 1893

General characteristics (as built)
- Class & type: Provence-class ironclad frigate
- Displacement: 5,810 t (5,720 long tons)
- Length: 82.9 m (272 ft) (o/a)
- Beam: 17.06 m (56 ft)
- Draft: 8.4 m (27 ft 7 in) (deep load)
- Installed power: 8 boilers; 3,200 PS (2,400 kW)
- Propulsion: 1 shaft, 1 HRCR-steam engine
- Sail plan: Barque-rig
- Speed: 14.5 knots (26.9 km/h; 16.7 mph)
- Range: 2,410 nautical miles (4,460 km; 2,770 mi) at 10 knots (19 km/h; 12 mph)
- Complement: 579–594
- Armament: 4 × 240 mm (9.4 in) rifled muzzle-loading (RML) guns; 7 × 194 mm (7.6 in) smoothbore guns; 6 × 164.7 mm (6.5 in) RML guns
- Armor: Belt: 150 mm (5.9 in); Battery: 110 mm (4.3 in); Conning tower: 100 mm (3.9 in)

The French ironclad Revanche was one of 10 Provence-class armored frigates built for the French Navy (Marine Nationale) during the 1860s. Commissioned in 1867, she was initially assigned to the Northern Squadron (Escadre du Nord). The ironclad played a minor role in the Franco-Prussian War of 1870–1871, blockading the North Sea coast of Prussia. Revanche was placed in reserve after the war, but was reactivated in 1875, sometimes serving as a flagship. Assigned to the Mediterranean Squadron (Escadre de la Méditerranée), she suffered a boiler explosion in 1877 that required extensive repairs and did not return to service until late 1878. The ship was decommissioned in 1883 and served in second-line duties, including service as a guard ship in 1892–1893, until she was stricken in early 1893 and subsequently scrapped.

== Design and description ==
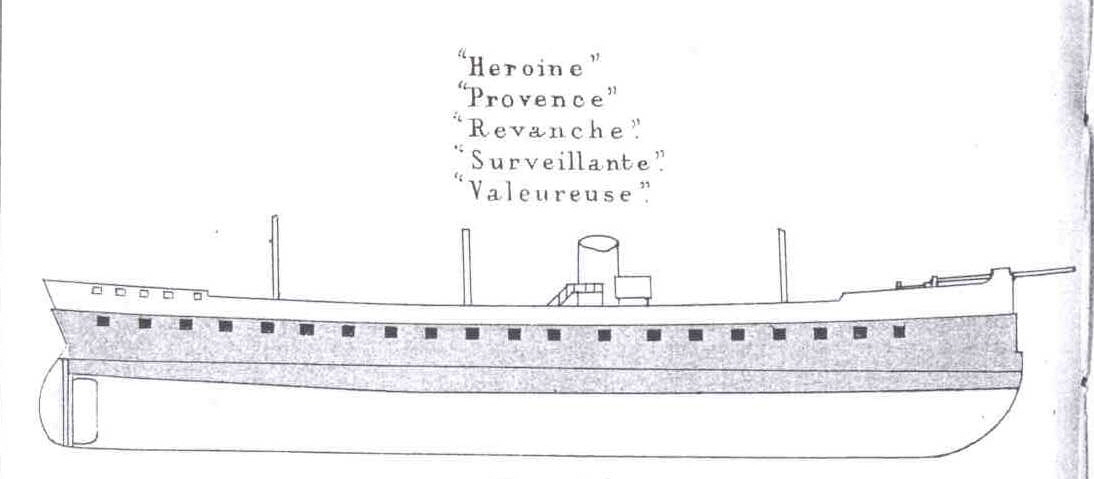
Right elevation line drawing of the class; the shaded area shows the armor protection

The Provence class was designed as an enlarged version of the Gloire-class ironclads with thicker armor, more powerful guns, and better seakeeping qualities. The ships had an overall length of 82.9 meters (272 ft), a beam of 17.06 meters (56 ft), and a draft of 8.4 meters (27 ft 7 in) at deep load. They displaced 5,810 metric tons (5,720 long tons). Their crew numbered 579–594 officers and enlisted men.

When the French discovered that the British ironclad Warrior had reached 14.3 knots (26.5 km/h; 16.5 mph) during her sea trials, they decided to add an extra cylinder to the engine of the five ships still under construction, including Revanche, in an attempt to achieve 14.5 knots (26.9 km/h; 16.7 mph). She had a single three-cylinder horizontal-return connecting-rod steam engine that drove the propeller shaft, using steam provided by eight boilers. The engine was rated at 1,000 nominal horsepower or 3,200 metric horsepower (2,400 kW). The Provence class carried enough coal to allow them to steam for 2,410 nautical miles (4,460 km; 2,770 mi) at a speed of 10 knots (19 km/h; 12 mph). They were fitted with a three-masted barque rig that had a sail area of 1,960 square meters (21,100 sq ft).

=== Armament and protection ===
The main battery of the Provence-class ships was intended to be thirty 164.7-millimeter (6.5 in) Modèle 1858–60 rifled muzzle-loading (RML) guns, but this was changed to a mixed armament of four 240-millimeter (9.4 in) Modèle 1864 RMLs and six 194-millimeter (7.6 in) Modèle 1864 smoothbore muzzle-loading guns on the gundeck. Positioned on the quarterdeck and the forecastle were another 194 mm smoothbore and six 164.7 mm Modèle 1858 RMLs, at least some of which served as chase guns. Shortly after commissioning, Revanche's gundeck armament was probably changed to eight 240 mm Modèle 1864 RMLs.

From the upper deck down to below the waterline, the sides of the ships were completely armored with 150 mm (5.9 in) of wrought iron, backed by 750 mm (29.5 in) of wood. The sides of the battery itself were protected with 110 mm (4.3 in) of armor that was backed by 610 mm (24 in) of wood. The conning tower's sides consisted of 100-millimeter (3.9 in) armor plates.

== Construction and service ==
Revanche (Revenge) was ordered on 16 November 1860 from the Arsenal de Toulon, laid down in March 1861 and launched on 28 December 1865. She was commissioned for trials on 16 April 1867, and was definitively commissioned (armement définitif) on 1 May under the command of Captain (Capitaine de vaisseau) Bernard Jauréguiberry. By 1870 the ship was assigned to the Northern Squadron and Captain Laurent Lejeune was in command.

When the Franco-Prussian War began on 19 July 1870, the French had lost track of a squadron of four Prussian ironclads so the Mediterranean Squadron, including Revanche, was deployed to Oran, French Algeria, to intercept them in case they attempted to interdict the troop convoys between French North Africa and Metropolitan France. When they received word that the Prussian ships had returned to Germany, the squadron sailed to Brest to prepare to blockade the coast of Prussia. Revanche was assigned to Vice Admiral Léon Martin Fourichon's squadron that was tasked to blockade German ports in the Heligoland Bight. It departed Brest on 8 August and arrived off the British-owned island of Heligoland three days later. The neutral British denied the French permission to re-coal there and the ships were forced to perform it at sea under dangerous conditions. Bad weather and a series of storms beginning in late August prevented the squadron from coaling and the ships were forced to return to France in early September. By then the Prussians were besieging Paris and many of the trained gunners aboard the squadron's ships were transferred to defend the city. The squadron resumed the blockade with reduced crews until December when smaller ships took it over.

Revanche was reduced to reserve in Toulon on 20 March 1871 and was reactivated for service with the Mediterranean Squadron on 12 November 1875 where she became the flagship of Vice Admiral (vice-amiral) Pierre-Gustave Roze. On 20 March 1877 at Villefranche-sur-Mer there was a boiler explosion aboard the ship that killed 26 men and wounded 60 crewmen. Revanche returned to Toulon for repairs and was placed in reserve on 16 May. The ship conducted sea trials on 5 February 1878 and returned to active service on 20 October. She was decommissioned and condemned in 1883 and served as an annex in 1889–1891 to Provençal, the station ship at Toulon. Revanche then became the guard ship of the mobile defenses of Algiers, French Algeria, until she was stricken from the navy list on 10 January 1893 and subsequently scrapped.

== Bibliography ==
- de Balincourt, Captain & Vincent-Bréchignac, Captain (1975). "The French Navy of Yesterday: Ironclad Frigates: Second Group – Provence Type". F.P.D.S. Newsletter. III (2): 9–13. OCLC 41554533.
- Campbell, N. J. M. (1979). "France". In Chesneau, Roger & Kolesnik, Eugene M. (eds.). Conway's All the World's Fighting Ships 1860–1905. Greenwich, UK: Conway Maritime Press. pp. 282–333. ISBN 0-8317-0302-4.
- Gille, Eric (1999). Cent ans de cuirassés français [A Century of French Battleships] (in French). Nantes: Marines. ISBN 2-909-675-50-5.
- Roberts, Stephen S. (2021). French Warships in the Age of Steam 1859–1914: Design, Construction, Careers and Fates. Barnsley, UK: Seaforth Publishing. ISBN 978-1-5267-4533-0.
- Roche, Jean-Michel (2005). Dictionnaire des bâtiments de la flotte de guerre française de Colbert à nos jours [Dictionary of French Warships from Colbert to Today] (in French). Vol. Tome I: 1671–1870. Toulon: Group Retozel-Maury Millau. ISBN 978-2-9525917-0-6. OCLC 165892922.
- Silverstone, Paul H. (1984). Directory of the World's Capital Ships. New York: Hippocrene Books. ISBN 0-88254-979-0.
- Wilson, H. W. (1896). Ironclads in Action: A Sketch of Naval Warfare From 1855 to 1895, with Some Account of the Development of the Battleship in England. Vol. 1. Boston: Little, Brown. OCLC 902936108.
- Winfield, Rif & Roberts, Stephen S. (2015). French Warships in the Age of Sail, 1786–1861. Barnsley, UK: Seaforth Publishing. ISBN 978-1-84832-204-2.
