= French ironclad Guyenne =

French Provence-class armored frigates

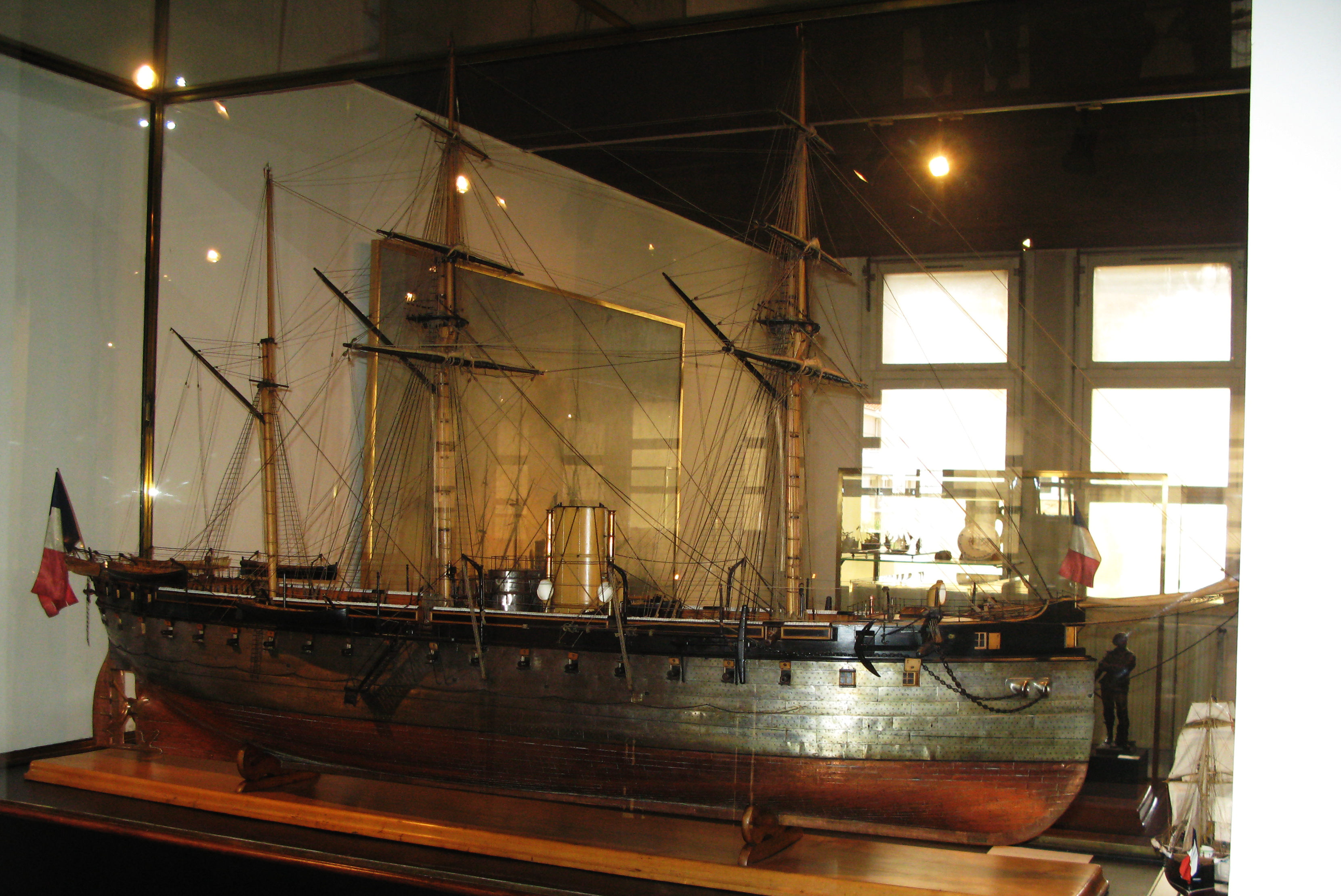
- A scale model of sister ship Flandre

History

France
- Name: Guyenne
- Namesake: Guyenne
- Ordered: 16 November 1860
- Builder: Arsenal de Rochefort
- Laid down: 11 February 1861
- Launched: 6 September 1865
- Completed: April 1867
- Commissioned: 6 November 1867
- Stricken: 19 October 1882
- Fate: Scrapped, 1887

General characteristics (as built)
- Type: Provence-class ironclad frigate
- Displacement: 5,810 t (5,720 long tons)
- Length: 82.9 m (272 ft) (o/a)
- Beam: 17.06 m (56 ft)
- Draft: 8.4 m (27 ft 7 in) (deep load)
- Installed power: 8 boilers; 3,224 ihp (2,404 kW) (trials)
- Propulsion: 1 shaft, 1 HRCR-steam engine
- Sail plan: Barque-rig
- Speed: 14 knots (26 km/h; 16 mph) (trials)
- Range: 2,410 nautical miles (4,460 km; 2,770 mi) at 10 knots (19 km/h; 12 mph)
- Complement: 579–594
- Armament: 4 × 240 mm (9.4 in)) rifled muzzle-loading (RML) guns; 7 × 194 mm (7.6 in) smoothbore guns; 6 × 164.7 mm (6.5 in) RML guns
- Armor: Belt: 150 mm (5.9 in); Battery: 110 mm (4.3 in); Conning tower: 100 mm (3.9 in)

The French ironclad Guyenne was one of 10 Provence-class armored frigates built for the French Navy (Marine Nationale) during the 1860s. Commissioned in 1867, she was initially assigned to the Northern Squadron (Escadre du Nord). The ironclad played a minor role in the Franco-Prussian War of 1870–1871, blockading the Baltic and North Sea coasts of Prussia. Guyenne was decommissioned after the war, but was reactivated in 1877. She was transferred to the Mediterranean Squadron (Escadre de la Méditerranée) later that year and then to the Eastern Mediterranean the following year. The ship was reduced to reserve in 1879, stricken from the naval register three years later and was scrapped in 1887.

== Design and description ==
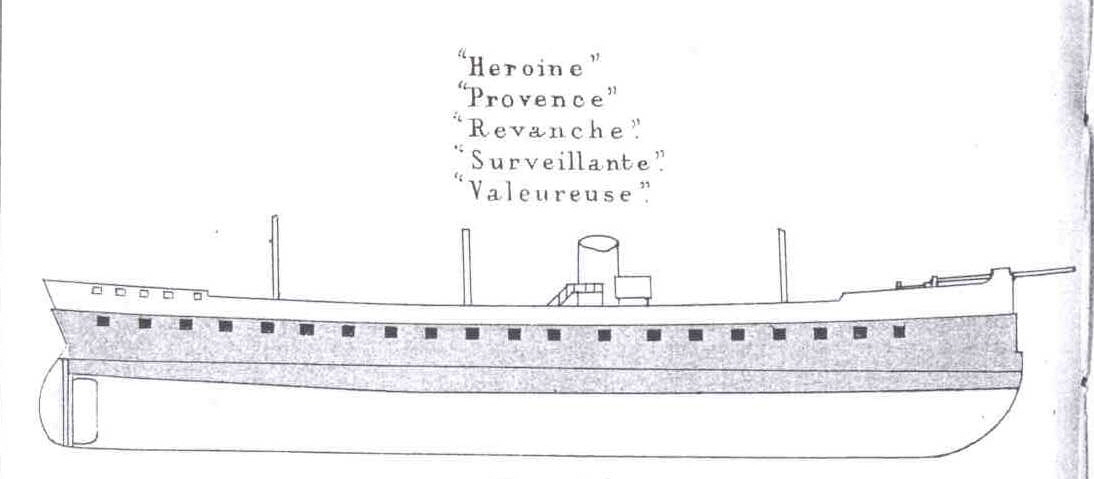
Right elevation line drawing of the class; the shaded area shows the armor protection

The Provence class was designed as an enlarged version of the Gloire-class ironclads with thicker armor, more powerful guns, and better seakeeping qualities. The ships had an overall length of 82.9 meters (272 ft), a beam of 17.06 meters (56 ft), and a draft of 8.4 meters (27 ft 7 in) at deep load. They displaced 5,810 metric tons (5,720 long tons). Their crew numbered 579–594 officers and enlisted men.

Guyenne had a single two-cylinder horizontal-return connecting-rod steam engine that drove the propeller shaft, using steam provided by eight boilers. The engine was rated at 1,000 nominal horsepower or 3,200 metric horsepower (2,400 kW) and was intended to give the ships a speed in excess of 13 knots (24 km/h; 15 mph). Guyenne reached a speed of 14 knots (26 km/h; 16 mph) from 3,224 PS (2,371 kW) during her sea trials. The Provence-class ships carried enough coal to allow them to steam for 2,410 nautical miles (4,460 km; 2,770 mi) at a speed of 10 knots (19 km/h; 12 mph). They were fitted with a three-masted barque rig that had a sail area of 1,960 square meters (21,100 sq ft).

=== Armament and protection ===
The main battery of the Provence-class ships was intended to be thirty 164.7-millimeter (6.5 in) Modèle 1858–60 rifled muzzle-loading (RML) guns, but this was changed to a mixed armament of four 240-millimeter (9.4 in) Modèle 1864 MLRs and six 194-millimeter (7.6 in) Modèle 1864 smoothbore muzzle-loading guns on the gundeck. Positioned on the quarterdeck and the forecastle were another 194 mm RML and six 164.7 mm Modèle 1858 RMLs, at least some of which served as chase guns.

From the upper deck down to below the waterline, the sides of the ships were completely armored with 150 mm (5.9 in) of wrought iron, backed by 750 mm (29.5 in) of wood. The sides of the battery itself were protected with 110 mm (4.3 in) of armor that was backed by 610 mm (24 in) of wood. The conning tower's sides consisted of 100-millimeter (3.9 in) armor plates.

== Construction and service ==
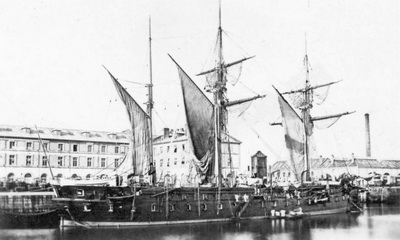
Guyenne before 1882

Guyenne, named after the historic province, was ordered on 16 November 1860 from the Arsenal de Rochefort, laid down on 11 February 1861 and launched on 6 September 1865. She was commissioned for trials on 15 April 1867, completed that same month, but was not definitively commissioned (armement définitif) until 6 November. Guyenne was assigned to the Ironclad Division (Division cuirassée) of the Northern Squadron, based in Cherbourg. She was in reserve when the Franco-Prussian War began on 19 July 1870. The ship was assigned to Vice Admiral (vice-amiral) Édouard Bouët-Willaumez's squadron that was tasked to blockade German ports in the Heligoland Bight. It departed Cherbourg on 24 July and, failing to find any German ships, proceeded to Danish waters to wait for further instructions. Bouët-Williaumez was ordered on 2 August to split his forces with half, including Guyenne, proceeding into the Baltic Sea to blockade the Prussian ports there under his command and the others to return to the Bight. The strong Prussian coastal defenses prevented any attack by the French ships, but their presence severely inhibited German shipping. Bouët-Willaumez was ordered to return to Cherbourg on 16 September where Guyenne joined the ships blockading the Bight. By then the Prussians were besieging Paris and many of the trained gunners aboard the squadron were transferred to defend the city. The squadron resumed the blockade with reduced crews until December when smaller ships took it over. After her sister Surveillante lost her rudder in a storm on 12 October, she had to be towed back to Cherbourg by Guyenne.

The ship was paid off and disarmed in May 1871 and remained in reserve until 1877 when she was reactivated for service with the Channel Division (Division de la Manche). Later that year Guyenne was transferred to the Squadron of Evolutions (Escadre d'évolution) of the Mediterranean Squadron. She was detached to the Eastern Mediterranean in 1878, but was reduced to reserve at Toulon on 1 February 1879. The ship was stricken on 19 October 1882, listed for sale the following year, and scrapped in 1887.

== Bibliography ==
- de Balincourt, Captain & Vincent-Bréchignac, Captain (1975a). "The French Navy of Yesterday: Ironclad Frigates: Second Group – Provence Type". F.P.D.S. Newsletter. III (2): 9–13. OCLC 41554533.
- de Balincourt, Captain & Vincent-Bréchignac, Captain (1975b). "The French Navy of Yesterday: Ironclad Frigates, Part IV". F.P.D.S. Newsletter. III (4). F.P.D.S.: 26–30. OCLC 41554533.
- Campbell, N. J. M. (1979). "France". In Chesneau, Roger & Kolesnik, Eugene M. (eds.). Conway's All the World's Fighting Ships 1860–1905. Greenwich, UK: Conway Maritime Press. pp. 282–333. ISBN 0-8317-0302-4.
- Gille, Eric (1999). Cent ans de cuirassés français [A Century of French Battleships] (in French). Nantes: Marines. ISBN 2-909-675-50-5.
- Roberts, Stephen S. (2021). French Warships in the Age of Steam 1859–1914: Design, Construction, Careers and Fates. Barnsley, UK: Seaforth Publishing. ISBN 978-1-5267-4533-0.
- Roche, Jean-Michel (2005). Dictionnaire des bâtiments de la flotte de guerre française de Colbert à nos jours [Dictionary of French Warships from Colbert to Today] (in French). Vol. Tome I: 1671–1870. Toulon: Group Retozel-Maury Millau. ISBN 978-2-9525917-0-6. OCLC 165892922.
- Silverstone, Paul H. (1984). Directory of the World's Capital Ships. New York: Hippocrene Books. ISBN 0-88254-979-0.
- Wilson, H. W. (1896). Ironclads in Action: A Sketch of Naval Warfare From 1855 to 1895, with Some Account of the Development of the Battleship in England. Vol. 1. Boston: Little, Brown. OCLC 902936108.
- Winfield, Rif & Roberts, Stephen S. (2015). French Warships in the Age of Sail, 1786–1861. Barnsley, UK: Seaforth Publishing. ISBN 978-1-84832-204-2.
