= French ironclad Héroïne =

Armored frigate build by the French Navy during the 1860s

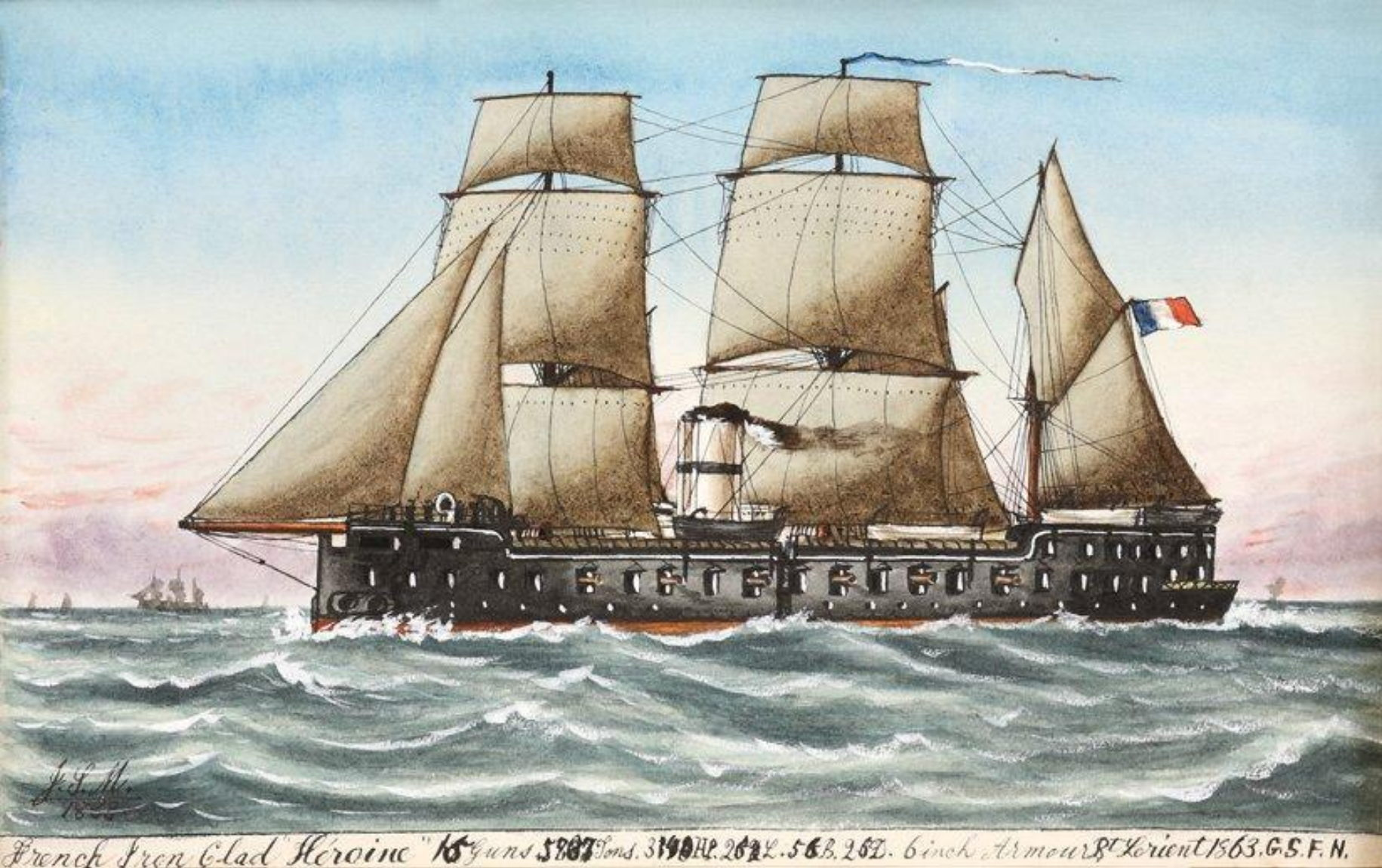
- Portrait of Héroïne in 1883, by James Scott Maxwell (1845-1922)

History

France
- Name: Héroïne
- Namesake: Hero (feminine form)
- Ordered: 16 November 1860
- Builder: Arsenal de Lorient
- Laid down: 10 June 1861
- Launched: 10 December 1863
- Completed: June 1865
- Commissioned: 7 June 1865
- Reclassified: As a floating battery, January 1898
- Stricken: 10 January 1893
- Fate: Scuttled, 29 December 1901

General characteristics (as completed)
- Class & type: Provence-class ironclad frigate
- Displacement: 5,969 t (5,875 long tons)
- Length: 80.08 m (262 ft 9 in) (waterline)
- Beam: 17.13 m (56 ft 2 in)
- Draft: 8.27 m (27 ft 2 in) (deep load)
- Installed power: 8 boilers; 2,918 PS (2,146 kW) (trials)
- Propulsion: 1 shaft, 1 HRCR-steam engine
- Sail plan: Barque-rig
- Speed: 13.68 knots (25.34 km/h; 15.74 mph) (trials)
- Range: 2,410 nautical miles (4,460 km; 2,770 mi) at 10 knots (19 km/h; 12 mph)
- Complement: 579–594
- Armament: 4 × 240 mm (9.4 in)) rifled muzzle-loading (RML) guns; 7 × 194 mm (7.6 in) smoothbore guns; 6 × 164.7 mm (6.5 in) RML guns
- Armor: Belt: 150 mm (5.9 in); Battery: 110 mm (4.3 in); Conning tower: 100 mm (4 in)

The French ironclad Héroïne was one of 10 Provence-class armored frigates built for the French Navy (Marine Nationale) during the 1860s. She was the only ship of the class to be built with an iron hull. Completed in 1865, the ship was initially assigned to the Northern Squadron (Escadre du Nord), sometimes serving as a flagship. The ironclad played a minor role in the Franco-Prussian War of 1870–1871, blockading the North Sea coast of Prussia and a Prussian commerce raider in a neutral Spanish port. Héroïne was decommissioned after the war, but was reactivated in 1876 and was assigned to the Mediterranean Squadron (Escadre de la Méditerranée).

She was transferred to the Levant Division (Division du Levant) the following year and then spent the years 1879–1881 in reserve. Héroïne was reactivated in 1882 and rejoined the Mediterranean Squadron. The ship was placed in reserve again in 1886 for the final time and was disarmed. Condemned in 1893, her engine was removed and she sailed to French West Africa the following year where she was hulked. The ship was converted into a floating battery in 1898, but was disarmed in early 1901. After an outbreak of yellow fever, she was scuttled in late 1901.

== Design and description ==
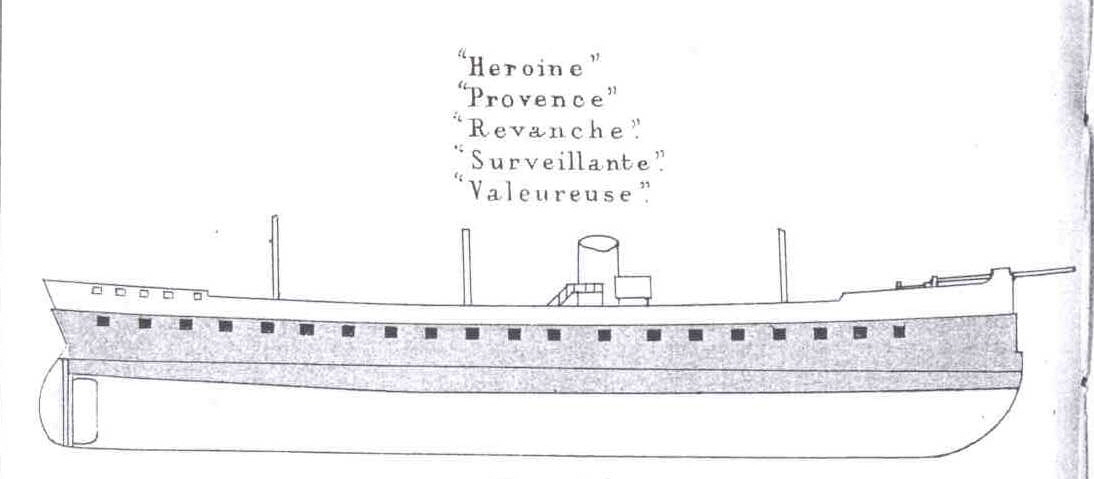
Right elevation line drawing of the class; the shaded area shows the armor protection

The Provence class was designed as an enlarged version of the Gloire-class ironclads with thicker armor, more powerful guns, and better seakeeping qualities. Héroïne was the only ship of the class with an iron hull and differed somewhat from her sister ships. She had a length of 80.08 meters (262 ft 9 in) at the waterline, a beam of 17.13 meters (56 ft 2 in), and a draft of 8.27 meters (27 ft 2 in) at deep load. The ship displaced 5,969 metric tons (5,875 long tons). Her crew numbered 579–594 officers and enlisted men.

Guyenne had a single two-cylinder horizontal-return connecting-rod compound steam engine that drove the propeller shaft, using steam provided by eight boilers. The engine was rated at 1,000 nominal horsepower or 3,200 metric horsepower (2,400 kW) and was intended to give the ships a speed in excess of 13 knots (24 km/h; 15 mph). Héroïne reached a speed of 13.68 knots (25.34 km/h; 15.74 mph) from 2,918 PS (2,146 kW) during her sea trials. The Provence-class ships carried enough coal to allow them to steam for 2,410 nautical miles (4,460 km; 2,770 mi) at a speed of 10 knots (19 km/h; 12 mph). They were fitted with a three-masted barque rig that had a sail area of 1,960 square meters (21,100 sq ft).

=== Armament and protection ===
The main battery of the Provence-class ships was intended to be thirty 164.7-millimeter (6.5 in) Modèle 1858–60 rifled muzzle-loading (RML) guns, but this was changed to a mixed armament of four 240-millimeter (9.4 in) Modèle 1864 MLRs and six 194-millimeter (7.6 in) Modèle 1864 smoothbore muzzle-loading guns on the gundeck. Positioned on the quarterdeck and the forecastle were another 194 mm RML and six 164.7 mm Modèle 1858 RMLs, at least some of which served as chase guns. Sometime after 1867, her armament was changed to a total of eight 240 mm Modèle 1864 RMLs.

From the upper deck down to below the waterline, the sides of the ships were completely armored with 150 mm (5.9 in) of wrought iron, backed by 750 mm (29.5 in) of wood. The sides of the battery itself were protected with 110 mm (4.3 in) of armor that was backed by 610 mm (24 in) of wood. The conning tower's sides consisted of 100-millimeter (3.9 in) armor plates.

== Construction and career ==
Héroïne (Heroine) was ordered on 16 November 1860 from the Arsenal de Lorient, laid down on 10 June 1861 and launched on 10 December 1863. She was commissioned for trials on 1 April 1864, completed in June 1865, and was definitively commissioned (armement définitif) on the 7th. The ship was assigned to the Ironclad Division (Division cuirassée) of the Northern Squadron, based in Cherbourg. After a visit to Plymouth, England, on 17–19 July by several other French ironclads, the French invited the Channel Fleet to visit Cherbourg on Emperor Napoleon III's birthday in August, to reciprocate British hospitality. They arrived on 14 August and remained for four days, their crews' exchanging ship visits, touring the dockyard and participating in multiple banquets and balls. The British then invited the Ironclad Division and the Mediterranean Squadron (Escadre de la Méditerranée) to visit Portsmouth. The French ships, including Héroïne, arrived later that month and remained until 2 September; their crews similarly occupied as the British were earlier. In September–October 1866 Héroïne, her sisters Magnanime and Flandre and the ironclad Magenta participated in fleet maneuvers and comparative gunnery trials. In 1867 Héroïne was assigned to the Squadron of Evolutions (Escadre d'évolutions) and she became the flagship of Rear Admiral (contre-amiral) Albert Gicquel des Touches in 1868. Two years later she was the flagship of Rear Admiral Bernard Jauréguiberry.

When the Franco-Prussian War began on 19 July 1870, Héroïne was assigned to Vice Admiral (vice-amiral) Léon Martin Fourichon's squadron that was tasked to blockade German ports in the Heligoland Bight. It departed Brest on 8 August and arrived off the British-owned island of Heligoland three days later. The neutral British denied the French permission to re-coal there and the ships were forced to perform it at sea under dangerous conditions. Bad weather and a series of storms beginning in late August prevented the squadron from coaling and the ships were forced to return to France in early September. By then the Prussians were besieging Paris and many of the trained gunners aboard the squadron were transferred to defend the city. The squadron resumed the blockade with reduced crews until December when smaller ships took it over. Héroïne arrived in mid-January 1871 and blockaded the German commerce raider SMS Augusta in Vigo, Spain, where she was resupplying in the neutral harbour. The ironclad was reinforced by three more ships in the following days which trapped Augusta until the Armistice of Versailles on 28 January.

Héroïne was paid off on 14 April 1871 in Toulon and remained in that status for the next five years. The ship was recommissioned on 21 January 1876 as part of the 2nd Division of the Squadron of Evolutions; later that year she sailed to Thessaloniki, Greece, after the Salonika Incident, where a mob assassinated the French and German Consuls in Thessaloniki on 6 May 1876. Héroïne was assigned to the Levant Division on 22 May 1877 and rejoined the Squadron of Evolutions later that year. The ship was placed in reserve again in 1879, but was reactivated in 1882. She returned to reserve in 1886 and was disarmed. Héroïne was condemned on 10 January 1893 and her engine was removed; on 11 January 1894 she departed Toulon, bound for Dakar, French West Africa, where she arrived on 6 February where she was hulked. The ship then served as a floating workshop. In January 1898, Héroïne was converted into a floating battery, but was disarmed in January 1901. A severe yellow fever outbreak later began aboard the hulk which was scuttled off Dakar on 29 December 1901 as a preventative measure.

== Bibliography ==
- de Balincourt, Captain & Vincent-Bréchignac, Captain (1975). "The French Navy of Yesterday: Ironclad Frigates: Second Group – Provence Type". F.P.D.S. Newsletter. III (2): 9–13. OCLC 41554533.
- Campbell, N. J. M. (1979). "France". In Chesneau, Roger & Kolesnik, Eugene M. (eds.). Conway's All the World's Fighting Ships 1860–1905. Greenwich, UK: Conway Maritime Press. pp. 282–333. ISBN 0-8317-0302-4.
- Gille, Eric (1999). Cent ans de cuirassés français [A Century of French Battleships] (in French). Nantes: Marines. ISBN 2-909-675-50-5.
- Hildebrand, Hans H.; Röhr, Albert & Steinmetz, Hans-Otto (1993). Die Deutschen Kriegsschiffe (Band 1) [The German Warships (Volume 1)] (in German). Ratingen: Mundus Verlag. ISBN 3-78220-237-6.
- Jones, Colin (1996). "Entente Cordiale, 1865". In McLean, David & Preston, Antony (eds.). Warship 1996. London: Conway Maritime Press. ISBN 0-85177-685-X.
- Roberts, Stephen S. (2021). French Warships in the Age of Steam 1859–1914: Design, Construction, Careers and Fates. Barnsley, UK: Seaforth Publishing. ISBN 978-1-5267-4533-0.
- Roche, Jean-Michel (2005). Dictionnaire des bâtiments de la flotte de guerre française de Colbert à nos jours [Dictionary of French Warships from Colbert to Today] (in French). Vol. Tome I: 1671–1870. Toulon: Group Retozel-Maury Millau. ISBN 978-2-9525917-0-6. OCLC 165892922.
- Silverstone, Paul H. (1984). Directory of the World's Capital Ships. New York: Hippocrene Books. ISBN 0-88254-979-0.
- Stenzel, Alfred (1900). "The Fleet and the Coast". In von Pfiugk-Harttung, Julius Albert Georg (ed.). The Franco-German War. London: Swan Sonnenschein and Co. OCLC 3788640.
- Wilson, H. W. (1896). Ironclads in Action: A Sketch of Naval Warfare From 1855 to 1895, with Some Account of the Development of the Battleship in England. Vol. 1. Boston: Little, Brown. OCLC 902936108.
- Winfield, Rif & Roberts, Stephen S. (2015). French Warships in the Age of Sail, 1786–1861. Barnsley, UK: Seaforth Publishing. ISBN 978-1-84832-204-2.
