= French ironclad Provence =

French Navy's Provence-class ironclad

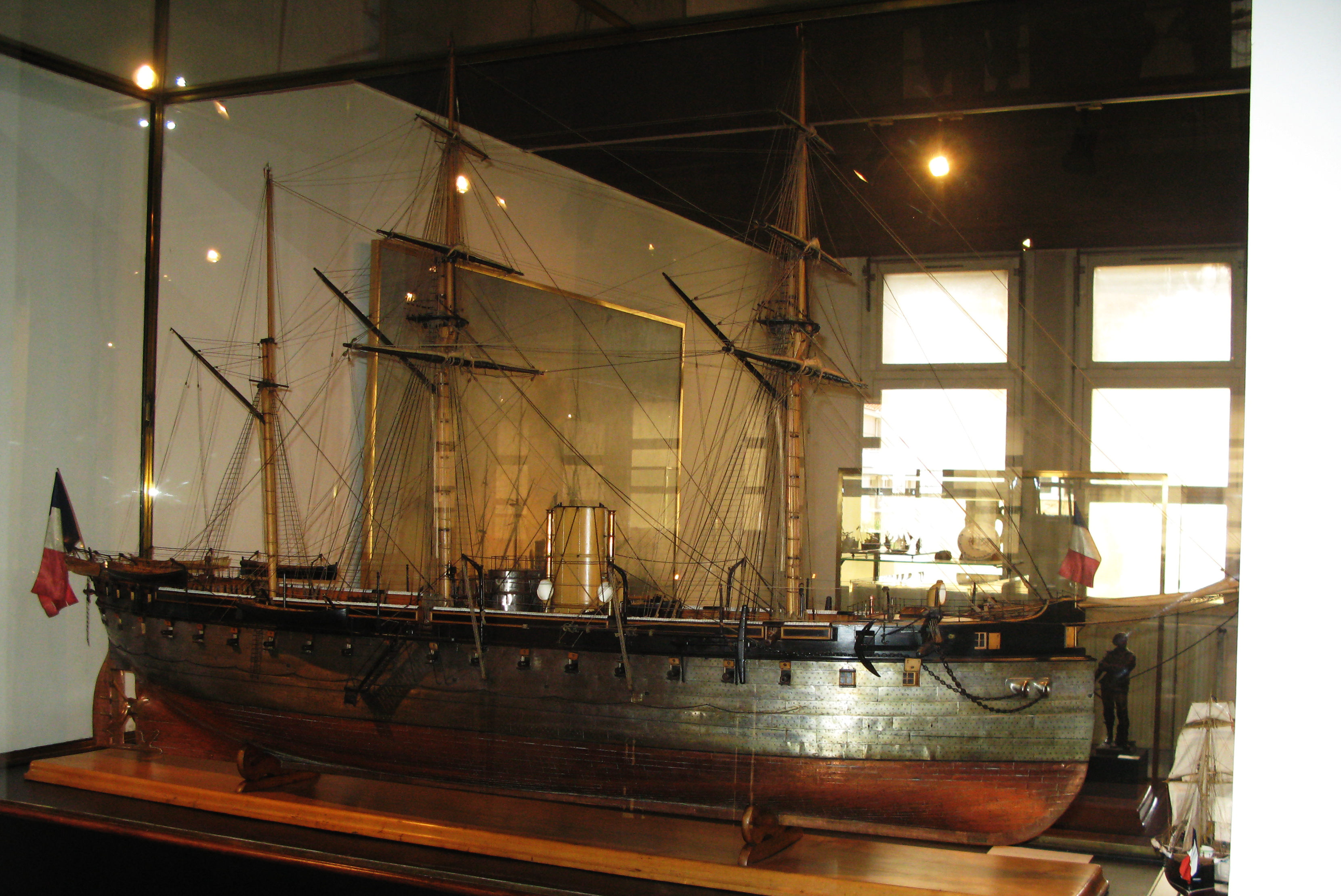
- A scale model of sister ship Flandre

History

France
- Name: Provence
- Namesake: Provence
- Ordered: 16 November 1860
- Builder: Arsenal de Toulon
- Laid down: March 1861
- Launched: 29 October 1863
- Completed: March 1864
- Commissioned: 1 February 1865
- Stricken: 3 May 1886
- Fate: Sold for scrap, 10 November 1893

General characteristics (as built)
- Type: Provence-class ironclad frigate
- Displacement: 5,810 t (5,720 long tons)
- Length: 82.9 m (272 ft) (o/a)
- Beam: 17.06 m (56 ft)
- Draft: 8.4 m (27 ft 7 in) (deep load)
- Installed power: 8 boilers; 3,537 ihp (2,638 kW) (trials)
- Propulsion: 1 shaft, 1 horizontal-return connecting rod-steam engine
- Sail plan: Barque-rig
- Speed: 14.34 knots (26.56 km/h; 16.50 mph) (trials)
- Range: 2,410 nautical miles (4,460 km; 2,770 mi) at 10 knots (19 km/h; 12 mph)
- Complement: 579–594
- Armament: 10 × 50 pdr (194 mm (7.6 in)) smoothbore guns; 22 × 164.7 mm (6.5 in) rifled muzzle-loading guns; 2 × 223.3 mm (8.8 in) Paixhans guns
- Armor: Belt: 150 mm (5.9 in); Battery: 110 mm (4.3 in); Conning tower: 100 mm (3.9 in)

The French ironclad Provence was the lead ship of her class of 10 armored frigates built for the French Navy (Marine Nationale) during the 1860s. Commissioned in 1865, she spent the bulk of her career with the Mediterranean Squadron (Escadre de la Méditerranée), often serving as a flagship. The ironclad played a minor role in the Franco-Prussian War of 1870–1871, blockading the North Sea coast of Prussia. Provence was decommissioned after the war, but was reactivated in late 1875.

She was assigned to the Eastern Mediterranean in early 1879 and became flagship of the Levant Naval Division (Division navale du Levant) later that year. The ship was condemned in 1886 and became a target ship until she was sold for scrap in 1893.

== Design and description ==
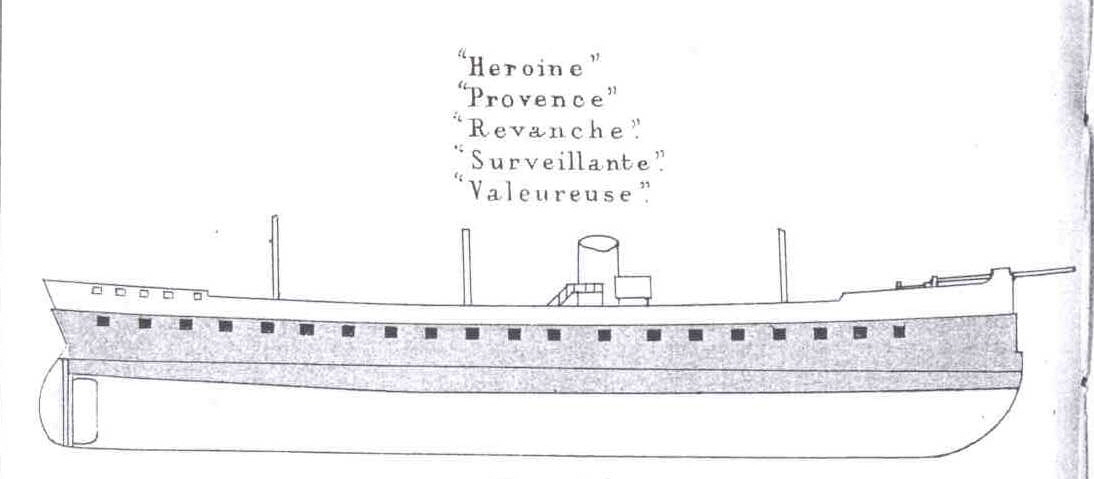
Right elevation line drawing of the class; the shaded area shows the armor protection

The Provence class was designed as an enlarged version of the Gloire-class ironclads with thicker armor, more powerful guns, and better seakeeping qualities. The ships had an overall length of 82.9 meters (272 ft), a beam of 17.06 meters (56 ft), and a draft of 8.4 meters (27 ft 7 in) at deep load. They displaced 5,810 metric tons (5,720 long tons). Their crew numbered 579–594 officers and enlisted men.

Provence had a single two-cylinder horizontal-return connecting-rod compound steam engine that drove the propeller shaft, using steam provided by eight boilers. The engine was rated at 1,000 nominal horsepower or 3,200 metric horsepower (2,400 kW) and was intended to give the ships a speed in excess of 13 knots (24 km/h; 15 mph). The ship reached a speed of 14.34 knots (26.56 km/h; 16.50 mph) from 3,537 ihp (2,638 kW) during her sea trials on 14 February 1865. The Provence-class ships carried enough coal to allow them to steam for 2,410 nautical miles (4,460 km; 2,770 mi) at a speed of 10 knots (19 km/h; 12 mph). They were fitted with a three-masted barque rig that had a sail area of 1,960 square meters (21,100 sq ft).

=== Armament and protection ===
The main battery of the Provence class was intended to be thirty 30-pounder 164.7-millimeter (6.5 in) Modèle 1858–60 rifled muzzle-loading (RML) guns, but the first two ships to be completed, Provence and Flandre, were armed with a mix of ten 50-pounder 194-millimeter (7.6 in) smoothbore guns, twenty-two 164.7 mm Modèle 1864 RMLs and a pair of 223.3-millimeter (8.8 in) RML Paixhans guns. By 1869–1870, Provence had been equipped with eight 240-millimeter (9.4 in) Modèle 1864 RMLs and four 194 mm Modèle 1864 weapons serving as chase guns.

From the upper deck down to below the waterline, the sides of the ships were completely armored with 150 mm (5.9 in) of wrought iron, backed by 750 mm (29.5 in) of wood. The sides of the battery itself were protected with 110 mm (4.3 in) of armor that was backed by 610 mm (24 in) of wood. The conning tower's sides consisted of 100-millimeter (3.9 in) armor plates.

== Construction and service ==
Provence, named after the historic province, was ordered on 16 November 1860 from the Arsenal de Toulon, laid down in March 1861 and launched on 29 October 1863. She was commissioned for trials on 25 February 1864 and was completed the following month, although the frigate was not definitively commissioned (armement définitif) until 1 February 1865. Provence was assigned to the Squadron of Evolutions (Escadre d'évolutions) of the Mediterranean Squadron. In May the ship escorted Emperor Napoleon III during an official visit to French Algeria. The Mediterranean Squadron sailed to Brest in August to rendezvous with the Northern Squadron (Escadre du Nord) for maneuvers. Before they began, however, the Mediterranean Squadron hosted a visit by the British Channel Fleet on 21–24 August. The combined squadrons visited Portsmouth a few days later and remained until 2 September, their crews visiting the dockyard, each other's ships and participating in multiple balls and banquets. Provence was present when a statue of Vice Admiral (vice amiral) Pierre André de Suffren was unveiled at Saint-Tropez on 4 April 1866. During the Third Italian War of Independence later that year, she ferried General Edmond Le Bœuf throughout the Adriatic Sea from 16 July to 20 October. The ship became the flagship of Rear Admiral (contre-amiral) Louis Pierre Alexis Pothuau in March 1868.

When the Franco-Prussian War began on 19 July 1870, the French had lost track of a squadron of four Prussian ironclads so the Mediterranean Squadron was deployed to Oran, French Algeria, to intercept them in case they attempted to interdict the troop convoys between French North Africa and Metropolitan France. When they received word that the Prussian ships had returned to Germany, the squadron sailed to Brest to prepare to blockade the coast of Prussia. Provence was assigned to Vice Admiral Léon Martin Fourichon's squadron that was tasked to blockade German ports in the Heligoland Bight. It departed Brest on 8 August and arrived off the British-owned island of Heligoland three days later. The neutral British denied the French permission to re-coal there and the ships were forced to perform it at sea under dangerous conditions. Bad weather and a series of storms beginning in late August prevented the squadron from coaling and the ships were forced to return to France in early September. By then the Prussians were besieging Paris and many of the trained gunners aboard the squadron were transferred to defend the city. The squadron resumed the blockade with reduced crews until December when smaller ships took it over.

Provence was paid off on 5 April 1871 and disarmed later that month although she was used from trials 18 March 1872 – 1873 before being reduced to reserve the following year. The ship was rearmed and recommissioned on 7 December 1875; she was assigned to the First Division of the Squadron of Evolutions in 1876–1878. On 17 January 1879 Provence became the flagship of Rear Admiral Laurent Joseph Lejeune and was detached to the Eastern Mediterranean. The ship became the flagship of Rear Admiral Léopold de Pritzbuer, commander of the Levant Naval Division on 3 June. Rear Admiral Alfred Conrad relieved de Pritzbuer on 1 August 1881. Provence was condemned on 3 May 1886 and was hulked for use as a target. The ship was sold for scrap on 10 November 1893 and broken up in Toulon.

== Bibliography ==
- de Balincourt, Captain & Vincent-Bréchignac, Captain (1975). "The French Navy of Yesterday: Ironclad Frigates: Second Group – Provence Type". F.P.D.S. Newsletter. III (2): 9–13. OCLC 41554533.
- Campbell, N. J. M. (1979). "France". In Chesneau, Roger & Kolesnik, Eugene M. (eds.). Conway's All the World's Fighting Ships 1860–1905. Greenwich, UK: Conway Maritime Press. pp. 282–333. ISBN 0-8317-0302-4.
- Gille, Eric (1999). Cent ans de cuirassés français [A Century of French Battleships] (in French). Nantes: Marines. ISBN 2-909-675-50-5.
- Jones, Colin (1996). "Entente Cordiale, 1865". In McLean, David & Preston, Antony (eds.). Warship 1996. London: Conway Maritime Press. ISBN 0-85177-685-X.
- Konstam, Angus (2019). European Ironclads 1860–75: The Gloire Sparks the Great Ironclad Arms Race. Oxford, UK: Osprey Publishing. ISBN 978-1-47282-676-3.
- Roberts, Stephen S. (2021). French Warships in the Age of Steam 1859–1914: Design, Construction, Careers and Fates. Barnsley, UK: Seaforth Publishing. ISBN 978-1-5267-4533-0.
- Roche, Jean-Michel (2005). Dictionnaire des bâtiments de la flotte de guerre française de Colbert à nos jours [Dictionary of French Warships from Colbert to Today] (in French). Vol. Tome I: 1671–1870. Toulon: Group Retozel-Maury Millau. ISBN 978-2-9525917-0-6. OCLC 165892922.
- Silverstone, Paul H. (1984). Directory of the World's Capital Ships. New York: Hippocrene Books. ISBN 0-88254-979-0.
- Wilson, H. W. (1896). Ironclads in Action: A Sketch of Naval Warfare From 1855 to 1895, with Some Account of the Development of the Battleship in England. Vol. 1. Boston: Little, Brown. OCLC 902936108.
- Winfield, Rif & Roberts, Stephen S. (2015). French Warships in the Age of Sail, 1786–1861. Barnsley, UK: Seaforth Publishing. ISBN 978-1-84832-204-2.
