= French ship Surveillante =

Surveillante is the name of the following French ships:

- French frigate Surveillante (1778)
- French frigate Surveillante (1802)
- French ironclad Surveillante

== See also ==
- Surveillante-class frigate
