= Provence-class ironclad =

1860s class of 10 French ironclads

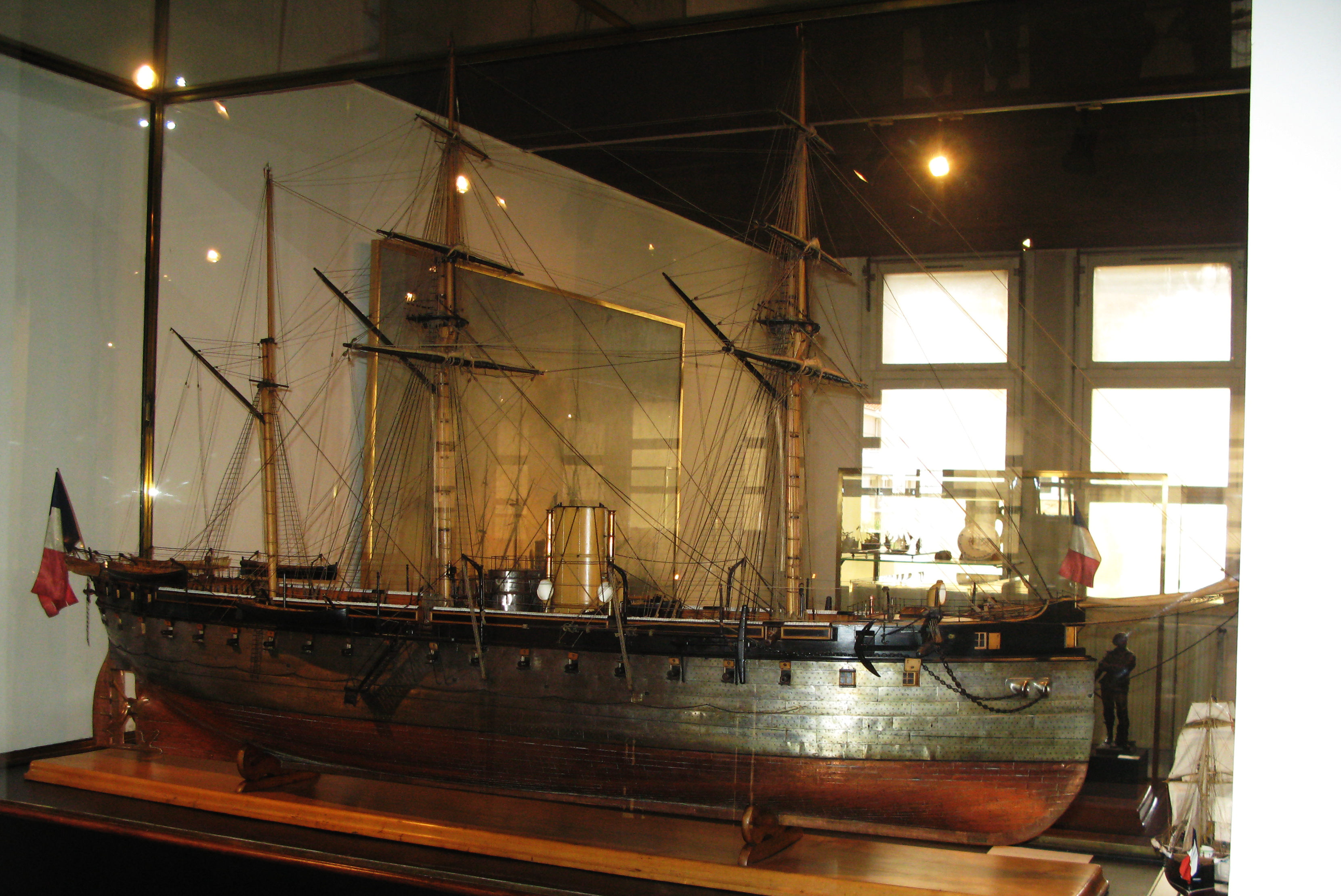
- A scale model of Flandre

Class overview
- Name: Provence-class
- Operators: French Navy
- Preceded by: Magenta class
- Succeeded by: Océan class
- Built: 1861–1867
- In commission: 1863–1893
- Completed: 10
- Scrapped: 10

General characteristics
- Type: Broadside ironclad
- Displacement: 5,810 t (5,720 long tons)
- Length: 82.9 m (272 ft) (o/a)
- Beam: 17.06 m (56 ft)
- Draft: 8.4 m (27 ft 7 in) (deep load)
- Installed power: 8 boilers; 2,918–3,895 PS (2,146–2,865 kW)
- Propulsion: 1 shaft, 1 horizontal-return connecting rod-steam engine
- Sail plan: Barque-rig
- Speed: 13.2–16.5 knots (24.4–30.6 km/h; 15.2–19.0 mph) (trials)
- Range: 2,410 nautical miles (4,460 km; 2,770 mi) at 10 knots (19 km/h; 12 mph)
- Complement: 579–594
- Armament: 11 × single 194 mm (7.6 in) smoothbore muzzle-loading guns
- Armor: Belt: 150 mm (5.9 in); Battery: 110 mm (4.3 in); Conning tower: 100 mm (4 in)

The Provence-class ironclads consisted of 10 ironclad frigates built for the French Navy (Marine Nationale) during the 1860s. Only one of the sister ships was built with an wrought iron hull; the others were built in wood. By 1865 they were armed with eleven 194-millimeter (7.6 in) guns and played a minor role in the 1870–1871 Franco-Prussian War. The ships began to be disposed of in the early 1880s, although several lingered on in subsidiary roles for another decade before they followed their sisters to the scrap yard.

== Design and description ==
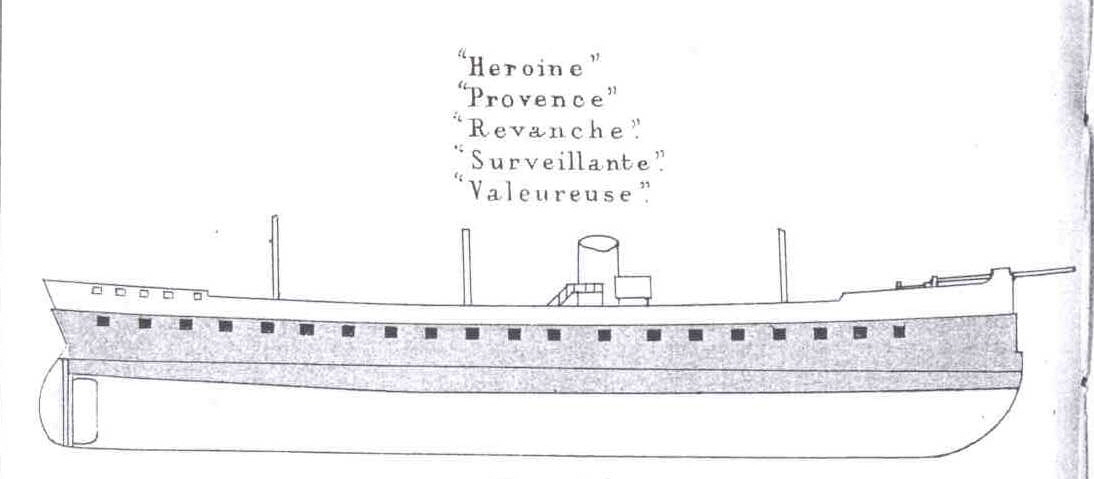
Right elevation line drawing of the class; the shaded area shows the armor protection

The Provence class was designed by naval architect Henri Dupuy de Lôme as an enlarged version of the Gloire-class ironclads with thicker armor, more powerful guns, and better seakeeping qualities. The ships had an overall length of 82.9 meters (272 ft), a beam of 17.06 meters (56 ft), and a draft of 8.4 meters (27 ft 7 in) at deep load. They displaced 5,810 metric tons (5,720 long tons). All of the ships except Héroïne had wooden hulls; that ship had an iron hull. The Provence-class ships had a metacentric height of about 1.4 meters (4.5 ft) and did not roll as badly as the Gloires. They had a crew of 579–594 officers and enlisted men.

The ships of the Provence class had a single horizontal-return connecting-rod compound steam engine that drove a four-bladed, 6.1-meter (20 ft) propeller, using steam provided by eight boilers at a maximum pressure of 1.8 kg/cm^{2} (177 kPa; 26 psi). The engine was rated at 1,000 nominal horsepower or 3,200 metric horsepower (2,400 kW) and was intended to give the ships a speed in excess of 13 knots (24 km/h; 15 mph). Available records of their sea trials show that they achieved speeds of 13.2–16.5 knots (24.4–30.6 km/h; 15.2–19.0 mph) from 2,918–3,895 metric horsepower (2,146–2,865 kW). The Provence class carried between 590–640 t (581–630 long tons) of coal which allowed them to steam for 2,410 nautical miles (4,460 km; 2,770 mi) at a speed of 10 knots (19 km/h; 12 mph). They were fitted with a three-masted barque rig that had a sail area of 1,960 square meters (21,100 sq ft).

=== Armament and protection ===
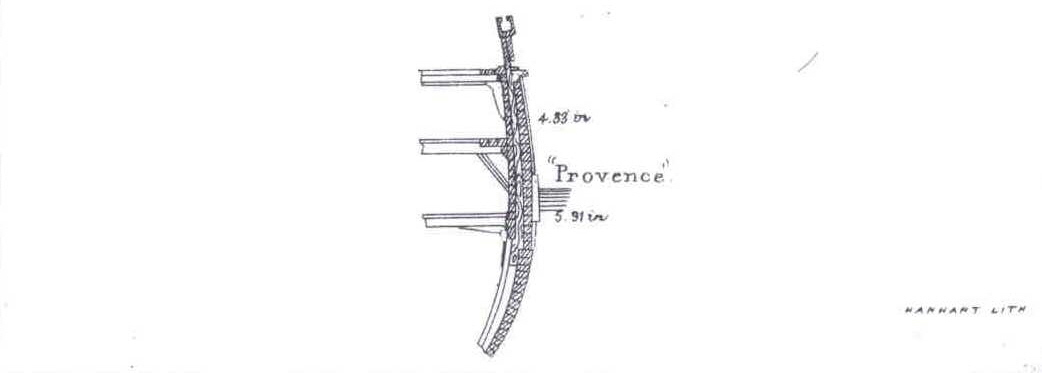
Cross-section of the armor of the Provence class

The main battery of the Provence-class ships was intended to be thirty 164.7-millimeter (6.5 in) Modèle 1858–60 rifled muzzle-loading (RML) guns, but this was changed to eleven 194-millimeter (7.6 in) Modèle 1864 smoothbore muzzle-loading guns in 1865. It is uncertain if any received their intended armament, although naval historian N. J. M. Campbell states that Flandre, Provence and Héroïne, three of the first ships completed, were armed with a mix of ten 164.7 mm smoothbores, twenty-two 164.7 mm RMLs and a pair of 220-millimeter (8.7 in) RML howitzers. Ten of the 194 mm Modèle 1864 guns were mounted on the broadside and one was on a pivot mount below the forecastle deck as a chase gun. Three years later, their armament was changed to eight 240-millimeter (9.4 in) RMLs and four 194 mm smoothbores. (Note: Sources vary regarding the armament of these ships, especially since dates are not often given. Campbell only gives the 1865 armament while naval historian Angus Konstam only provides the 1868 armament, except for agreeing with Campbell regarding the guns of Flandre, Provence and Héroïne.)

By 1873, the armament of the class consisted of eight Canon de 24 C modèle 1864 (9.4 in) rifled breech loaders on the battery deck, and four Canon de 19 C modèle 1864 (7.6 in) rifled breech loaders higher up.

The armor of the class consisted of iron backed by wood. Behind the armor belt, the wooden support was 760 mm (29.9 in) thick. From the upper deck down to below the waterline, the sides of the ships were completely armored with 150 mm (5.9 in) of wrought iron. The sides of the battery itself were protected with 110 mm (4.3 in) of armor. The conning tower's sides consisted of 102-millimeter (4 in) armor plates.

== Ships ==
Ship	Builder	Laid down	Launched	Commissioned	Fate
Flandre	Arsenal de Cherbourg	28 January 1861	12 June 1864	May 1865	Condemned, 12 November 1886
Gauloise	Arsenal de Brest	24 January 1861	26 April 1865	5 December 1867	Condemned, 3 October 1883
Guyenne	Arsenal de Rochefort	11 February 1861	6 September 1865	6 November 1867	Stricken from the navy list, 19 October 1882
Héroïne	Arsenal de Lorient	10 June 1861	19 December 1863	7 June 1865	Scuttled, 1901
Magnanime	Arsenal de Brest	27 February 1861	19 August 1864	1 November 1865	Stricken, 19 January 1882
Provence	Arsenal de Toulon	March 1861	29 October 1863	1 February 1865	Condemned, 3 May 1884
Revanche	Arsenal de Toulon	March 1861	28 December 1865	1 May 1867	Stricken, 10 January 1893
Savoie	Arsenal de Toulon	March 1861	29 September 1864	25 March 1865	19 November 1888
Surveillante	Arsenal de Lorient	28 January 1861	18 August 1864	21 October 1867	Stricken, 1890
Valeureuse	Arsenal de Brest	23 May 1861	18 August 1864	25 March 1867	Condemned, 9 December 1886

== Bibliography ==
- Ministère de la Marine et des Colonies (1873). Aide-Mémoire d'artillerie Navale Chapter 4-6. Georges Chamerot, Paris.
- de Balincourt, Captain; Vincent-Bréchignac, Captain (1975). "The French Navy of Yesterday: Ironclad Frigates: Second Group – Provence Type". F.P.D.S. Newsletter. III (2): 9–13. OCLC 41554533.
- Campbell, N. J. M. (1979). "France". In Chesneau, Roger & Kolesnik, Eugene M. (eds.). Conway's All the World's Fighting Ships 1860–1905. Greenwich, UK: Conway Maritime Press. pp. 282–333. ISBN 0-8317-0302-4.
- Gille, Eric (1999). Cent ans de cuirassés français [A Century of French Battleships] (in French). Nantes: Marines. ISBN 2-909-675-50-5.
- Konstam, Angus (2019). European Ironclads 1860–75: The Gloire Sparks the Great Ironclad Arms Race. Oxford, UK: Osprey Publishing. ISBN 978-1-47282-676-3.
- Roberts, Stephen S. (2021). French Warships in the Age of Steam 1859–1914: Design, Construction, Careers and Fates. Barnsley, UK: Seaforth Publishing. ISBN 978-1-5267-4533-0.
- Silverstone, Paul H. (1984). Directory of the World's Capital Ships. New York: Hippocrene Books. ISBN 0-88254-979-0.
- Wilson, H. W. (1896). Ironclads in Action: A Sketch of Naval Warfare From 1855 to 1895. Vol. 1 and 2. Boston: Little, Brown.
- Winfield, Rif & Roberts, Stephen S. (2015). French Warships in the Age of Sail, 1786–1861. Barnsley, UK: Seaforth Publishing. ISBN 978-1-84832-204-2.
