= French ironclad Flandre =

French ironclad battleship from the 1860s

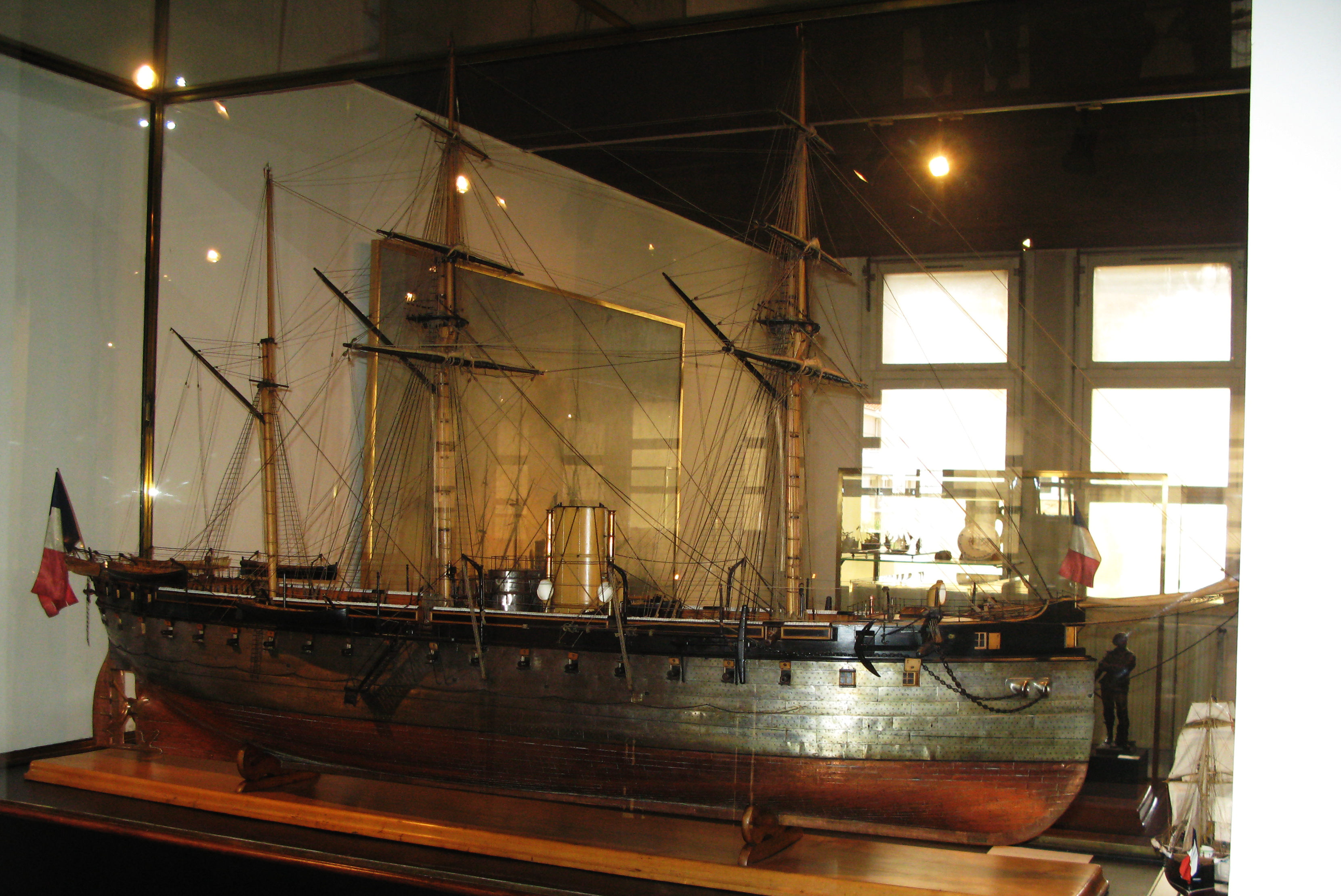
- A scale model of Flandre

History

France
- Name: Flandre
- Namesake: Flandre (Flanders)
- Builder: Arsenal de Cherbourg
- Laid down: 28 January 1861
- Launched: 12 June 1864
- Commissioned: May 1865
- Stricken: 12 November 1886
- Fate: Scrapped, 1887

General characteristics (as built)
- Type: Provence-class ironclad frigate
- Displacement: 5,810 t (5,720 long tons)
- Length: 82.9 m (272 ft) (o/a)
- Beam: 17.06 m (56 ft)
- Draft: 8.4 m (27 ft 7 in) (deep load)
- Installed power: 8 boilers; 3,852 PS (2,833 kW) (trials)
- Propulsion: 1 shaft, 1 horizontal-return connecting rod-steam engine
- Sail plan: Barque-rig
- Speed: 16.5 knots (30.6 km/h; 19.0 mph) (trials)
- Range: 2,410 nautical miles (4,460 km; 2,770 mi) at 10 knots (19 km/h; 12 mph)
- Complement: 579–594
- Armament: 10 × 50 pdr (194 mm (7.6 in)) smoothbore guns; 22 × 164.7 mm (6.5 in) rifled muzzle-loading guns; 2 × 223.3 mm (8.8 in) Paixhans guns
- Armor: Belt: 150 mm (5.9 in); Battery: 110 mm (4.3 in); Conning tower: 100 mm (3.9 in)

The French ironclad Flandre was one of ten Provence-class armored frigates built for the French Navy (Marine Nationale) in the 1860s. Commissioned in 1865, she was initially assigned to the Northern Squadron (Escadre du Nord) and sometimes served as a flagship. The ironclad played a minor role in the Franco-Prussian War of 1870–1871, blockading the North Sea coast of Prussia. Flandre was decommissioned after the war and remained in reserve for the next decade and a half. The ship was disarmed in 1884 and was scrapped three years later.

== Design and description ==
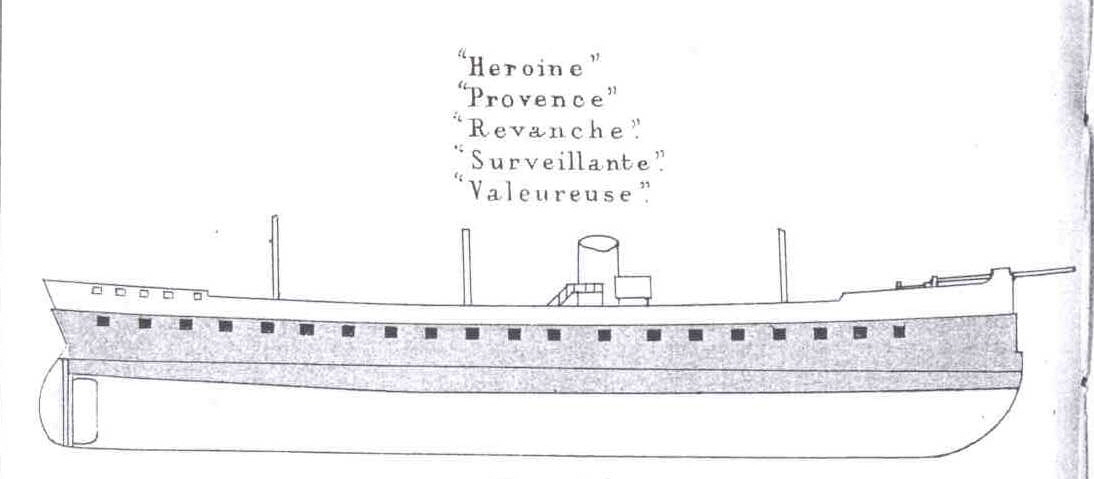
Starboard elevation line drawing of the class. The shaded area shows the armor protection.

The Provence class was designed as an enlarged version of the Gloire-class ironclads with thicker armor, more powerful guns, and better seakeeping qualities. The ships had an overall length of 82.9 meters (272 ft), a beam of 17.06 meters (56 ft), and a draft of 8.4 meters (27 ft 7 in) at deep load. They displaced 5,810 metric tons (5,720 long tons). Their crew numbered 579–594 officers and enlisted men.

Flandre had a single two-cylinder horizontal-return connecting-rod compound steam engine that drove the propeller shaft, using steam provided by eight boilers. The engine was rated at 1,000 nominal horsepower or 3,200 metric horsepower (2,400 kW) and was intended to give the ships a speed in excess of 13 knots (24 km/h; 15 mph). Flandre was the fastest ship of her class and reached a speed of 16.5 knots (30.6 km/h; 19.0 mph) from 3,852 PS (2,833 kW) on her sea trials. The Provence-class ships carried enough coal to allow them to steam for 2,410 nautical miles (4,460 km; 2,770 mi) at a speed of 10 knots (19 km/h; 12 mph). They were fitted with a three-masted barque rig that had a sail area of 1,960 square meters (21,100 sq ft).

=== Armament and protection ===
The main battery of the Provence class was intended to be thirty 30-pounder 164.7-millimeter (6.5 in) Modèle 1858–60 rifled muzzle-loading (RML) guns, but the first two ships to be completed, Flandre and Provence, were armed with a mix of ten 50-pounder 194-millimeter (7.6 in) smoothbore guns, twenty-two 164.7 mm Modèle 1864 RMLs and a pair of 223.3-millimeter (8.8 in) RML Paixhans guns. Two of the 164.7 mm guns served as chase guns. By 1869–1870, Flandre had been equipped with eight 240-millimeter (9.4 in) Modèle 1864 RMLs and four 194 mm Modèle 1864 weapons serving as chase guns.

From the upper deck down to below the waterline, the sides of the ships were completely armored with 150 mm (5.9 in) of wrought iron, backed by 750 mm (29.5 in) of wood. The sides of the battery itself were protected with 110 mm (4.3 in) of armor that was backed by 610 mm (24 in) of wood. The conning tower's sides consisted of 100-millimeter (3.9 in) armor plates.

== Construction and career ==
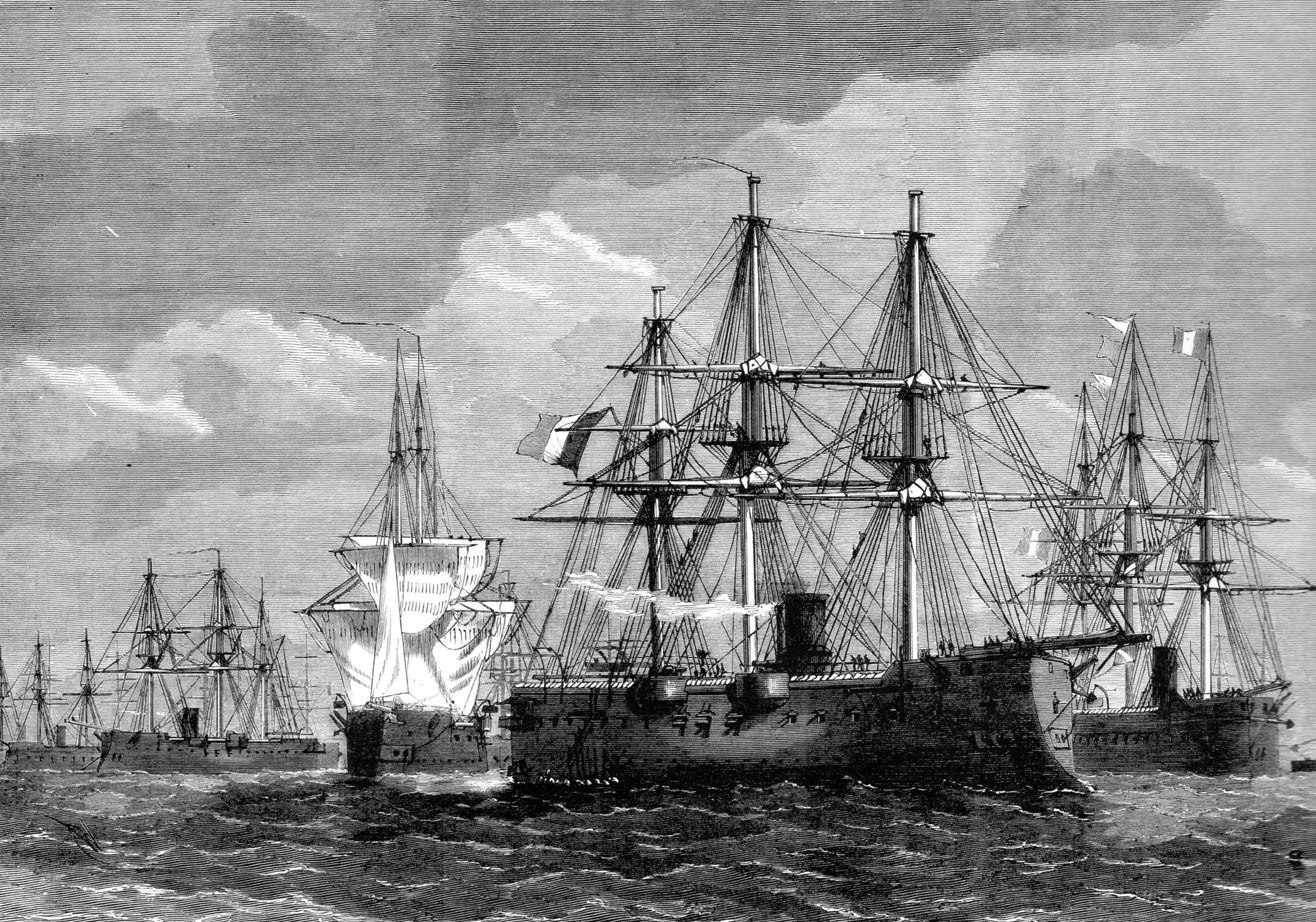
Flandre, third from the left with sails deployed

Flandre, named after the historic province, was ordered on 16 November 1860 from the Arsenal de Cherbourg. The ship was laid down on 28 January 1861 and launched on 12 June 1864. She was commissioned for trials on 20 February 1865, completed in April and was definitively commissioned (armement définitif) the following month.

Flandre was assigned to the Ironclad Division (Division cuirassée) of the Northern Squadron, based in Cherbourg. She made cruises to Portuguese Madeira and Spanish Tenerife, in the Canary Islands, over the next two years.

Together with the ironclad Magenta, the ship visited Plymouth, England, on 17–19 July to take part in the Exhibition of the Royal Agricultural Society. To reciprocate British hospitality, the French invited the Channel Fleet to visit Cherbourg on Emperor Napoleon III's birthday in August. They arrived on 14 August and remained for four days, their crew's exchanging ship visits, touring the dockyard and participating in multiple banquets and balls. The British invited the Ironclad Division and the Mediterranean Squadron (Escadre de la Méditerranée) to visit Portsmouth. The French ships, including Flandre, arrived later that month and remained until 2 September; their crews similarly occupied as the British were earlier. In September–October 1866 Flandre, her sisters Magnanime and Héroïne and Magenta took part in fleet maneuvers and comparative gunnery trials.

In January 1867, Flandre collided with the British merchantman Brutus in the Atlantic Ocean. Brutus sank with the loss of ten of her fourteen crew. Together with Magnanime and Magenta, Flandre escorted the transports ferrying French troops home after the collapse of the Second French intervention in Mexico in 1867. Two years later she became the flagship of Rear Admiral (contre-amiral) Charles de Dompierre d'Hornoy.

When the Franco-Prussian War began on 19 July 1870, France needed time to complete its mobilization. The ship was assigned to Vice Admiral (vice-amiral) Édouard Bouët-Willaumez's squadron that was tasked to blockade German ports in the Heligoland Bight. It left Cherbourg on 24 July and, failing to find any German ships, proceeded to Danish waters to await further orders. Bouët-Williaumez was ordered on 2 August to split his forces with half, including Flandre, proceeding into the Baltic Sea to blockade the Prussian ports there under his command and the others to return to the Bight. The strong Prussia coastal defenses prevented any attack by the French ships, but the French presence severely inhibited German shipping. Flandre and the ironclad Océan were relieved by the ironclads Rochambeau and Armide in August and returned to Cherbourg where Flandre joined the ships blockading the Bight.

The neutral British had denied the French permission to bunker at Heligoland, so the ships were forced to do so at sea under dangerous conditions. Bad weather and a series of storms beginning in late August prevented the squadron from bunkering and the ships were forced to return to France in early September. By then Prussia was besieging Paris and many of the trained gunners aboard the squadron's ships were transferred to defend the city. The squadron resumed the blockade with reduced crews until December when smaller ships took it over. In a storm on 12 October, the armored frigate Surveillante lost her rudder and had to be towed back to Cherbourg by Flandre.

The ship was paid off in Cherbourg on 18 March 1871 and was briefly reactivated on 20 October 1873 to test a torpedo-outrigger system. Flandre was rearmed in 1875 with Modèle 1870 guns, but remained in reserve until she was disarmed in November 1884. Flandre stricken from the naval register on 12 November 1886 and scrapped in 1887.

== Bibliography ==
- de Balincourt, Captain & Vincent-Bréchignac, Captain (1975a). "The French Navy of Yesterday: Ironclad Frigates: Second Group – Provence Type". F.P.D.S. Newsletter. III (2): 9–13. OCLC 41554533.
- de Balincourt, Captain & Vincent-Bréchignac, Captain (1975b). "The French Navy of Yesterday: Ironclad Frigates, Part IV". F.P.D.S. Newsletter. III (4): 26–30. OCLC 41554533.
- Campbell, N. J. M. (1979). "France". In Chesneau, Roger & Kolesnik, Eugene M. (eds.). Conway's All the World's Fighting Ships 1860–1905. Greenwich, UK: Conway Maritime Press. pp. 282–333. ISBN 0-8317-0302-4.
- Gille, Eric (1999). Cent ans de cuirassés français [A Century of French Battleships] (in French). Nantes: Marines. ISBN 2-909-675-50-5.
- Jones, Colin (1996). "Entente Cordiale, 1865". In McLean, David & Preston, Antony (eds.). Warship 1996. London: Conway Maritime Press. pp. 31–40. ISBN 0-85177-685-X.
- Konstam, Angus (2019). European Ironclads 1860–75: The Gloire Sparks the Great Ironclad Arms Race. Oxford, UK: Osprey Publishing. ISBN 978-1-47282-676-3.
- Roberts, Stephen S. (2021). French Warships in the Age of Steam 1859–1914: Design, Construction, Careers and Fates. Barnsley, UK: Seaforth Publishing. ISBN 978-1-5267-4533-0.
- Roche, Jean-Michel (2005). Dictionnaire des bâtiments de la flotte de guerre française de Colbert à nos jours [Dictionary of French Warships from Colbert to Today] (in French). Vol. Tome I: 1671–1870. Toulon: Group Retozel-Maury Millau. ISBN 978-2-9525917-0-6. OCLC 165892922.
- Silverstone, Paul H. (1984). Directory of the World's Capital Ships. New York: Hippocrene Books. ISBN 0-88254-979-0.
- Wilson, H. W. (1896). Ironclads in Action: A Sketch of Naval Warfare From 1855 to 1895, with Some Account of the Development of the Battleship in England. Vol. 1. Boston: Little, Brown. OCLC 902936108.
- Winfield, Rif & Roberts, Stephen S. (2015). French Warships in the Age of Sail, 1786–1861. Barnsley, UK: Seaforth Publishing. ISBN 978-1-84832-204-2.
