= French ironclad Surveillante =

Provence-class armored frigates

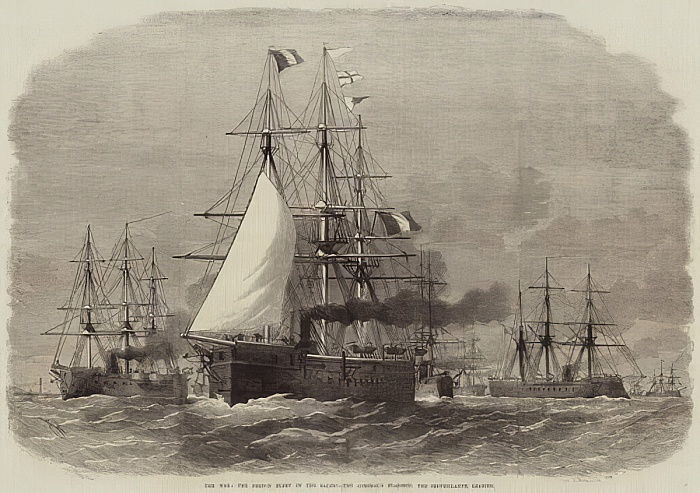
- The French Fleet in the Baltic, the Admiral's Flagship, the Surveillante, Leading

History

Second French Empire
- Name: Surveillante
- Namesake: Guardian
- Ordered: 12 November 1860
- Builder: Arsenal de Lorient
- Laid down: 28 January 1861
- Launched: 28 August 1864
- Completed: May 1867
- Commissioned: 21 October 1867
- Reclassified: As a guard ship, 1887; As a storeship, 1890
- Stricken: 1890
- Fate: Scrapped, 1898

General characteristics
- Class & type: Provence-class ironclad frigate
- Displacement: 5,700–6,000 t (5,600–5,900 long tons)
- Length: 80.72 m (264 ft 10 in)
- Beam: 17 m (55 ft 9 in)
- Draft: 7.7–8.8 m (25 ft 3 in – 28 ft 10 in)
- Installed power: 8 boilers; 3,254 PS (2,393 kW) (trials)
- Propulsion: 1 shaft, 1 HRCR-steam engine
- Sail plan: Barque-rig
- Speed: 13.2 knots (24.4 km/h; 15.2 mph) (trials)
- Range: 2,410 nautical miles (4,460 km; 2,770 mi) at 10 knots (19 km/h; 12 mph)
- Complement: 579–594
- Armament: 11 × single 194 mm (7.6 in) smoothbore muzzle-loading guns
- Armor: Belt: 150 mm (5.9 in); Battery: 110 mm (4.3 in); Conning tower: 100 mm (3.9 in)

The French ironclad Surveillante was one of 10 Provence-class armored frigates built for the French Navy (Marine Nationale) during the 1860s. Commissioned in 1867, she was initially assigned to the Northern Squadron (Escadre du Nord). The ironclad played a minor role as a flagship in the Franco-Prussian War of 1870–1871, blockading the Baltic and North Sea coasts of Prussia. Surveillante was decommissioned after the war, but was reactivated in 1876. She was transferred to the Mediterranean Squadron (Escadre de la Méditerranée) the following year.

The ship was reduced to reserve in 1879, but was reactivated in 1880 and participated in the French occupation of Tunisia the following year. Surveillante spent most of the years between 1882 and 1887 in reserve. The ship was condemned that latter year, but served as a guard ship until 1890. She then hulked as a coal storeship and was finally scrapped in 1898.

== Design and description ==
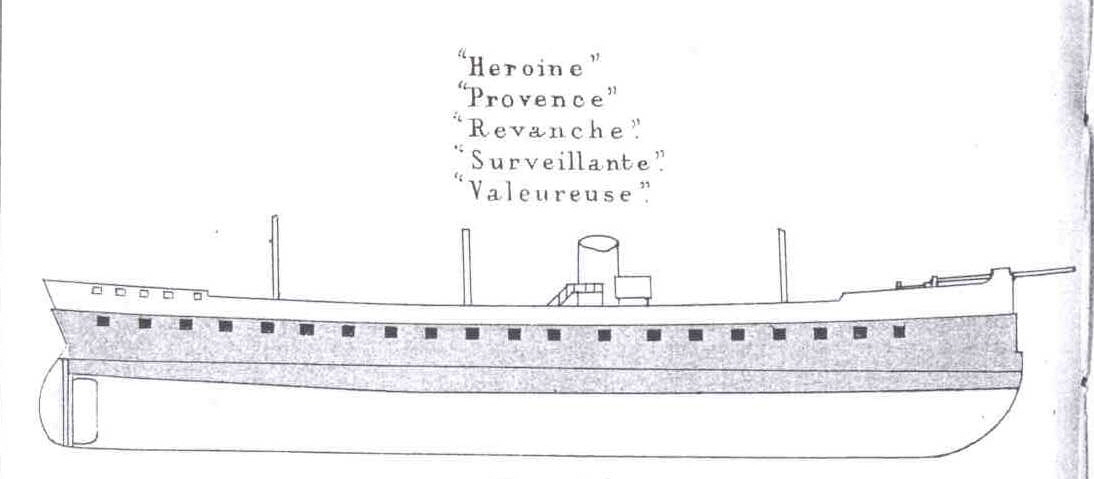
Right elevation line drawing of the class; the shaded area shows the armor protection

The Provence class was designed as an enlarged version of the Gloire-class ironclads with thicker armor, more powerful guns, and better seakeeping qualities. The ships had an overall length of 82.9 meters (272 ft), a beam of 17.06 meters (56 ft), and a draft of 8.4 meters (27 ft 7 in) at deep load. They displaced 5,810 metric tons (5,720 long tons). Their crew numbered 579–594 officers and enlisted men.

Surveillante had a single two-cylinder horizontal-return connecting-rod compound steam engine that drove the propeller shaft, using steam provided by eight boilers. The engine was rated at 1,000 nominal horsepower or 3,200 metric horsepower (2,400 kW) and was intended to give the ships a speed in excess of 13 knots (24 km/h; 15 mph). Surveillante reached a speed of 13.2 knots (24.4 km/h; 15.2 mph) from 3,254 metric horsepower (2,393 kW) during her sea trials. The Provence-class ships carried enough coal to allow them to steam for 2,410 nautical miles (4,460 km; 2,770 mi) at a speed of 10 knots (19 km/h; 12 mph). They were fitted with a three-masted barque rig that had a sail area of 1,960 square meters (21,100 sq ft).

=== Armament and protection ===
The main battery of the Provence-class ships was intended to be thirty 164.7-millimeter (6.5 in) Modèle 1858–60 rifled muzzle-loading (RML) guns, but this was changed to a mixed armament of four 240-millimeter (9.4 in) Modèle 1864 RMLs and six 194-millimeter (7.6 in) Modèle 1864 smoothbore muzzle-loading guns on the gundeck. Positioned on the quarterdeck and the forecastle were another 194 mm RML and six 164.7 mm Modèle 1858 RMLs, at least some of which served as chase guns. By 1869–1870, Surveillante had been equipped with eight 240-millimeter (9.4 in) Modèle 1864 RMLs and four 194 mm Modèle 1864 weapons serving as chase guns.

From the upper deck down to below the waterline, the sides of the ships were completely armored with 150 mm (5.9 in) of wrought iron, backed by 750 mm (29.5 in) of wood. The sides of the battery itself were protected with 110 mm (4.3 in) of armor that was backed by 610 mm (24 in) of wood. The conning tower's sides consisted of 100-millimeter (3.9 in) armor plates.

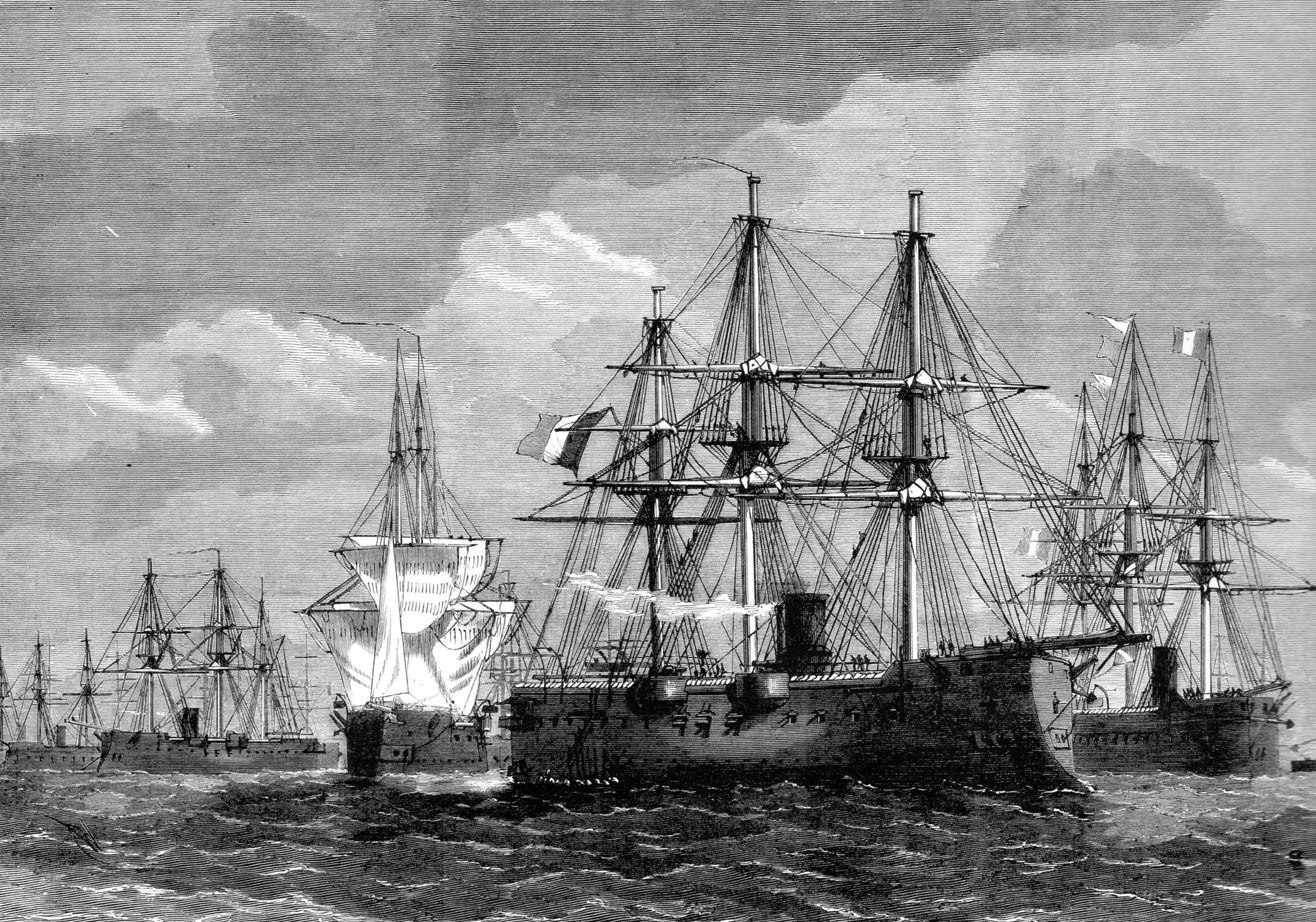
The French squadron of the East in front of Heligoland on 26 September 1870, Surveillante on the far right

== Construction and service ==
Surveillante (Guardian) was ordered on 16 November 1860 from the Arsenal de Lorient, was laid down on 28 January 1861 and launched on 18 August 1864. She was commissioned for trials on 13 May 1867, completed that same month, but was not definitively commissioned (armement définitif) until 21 October. Surveillante was assigned to the Ironclad Division (Division cuirassée) of the Northern Squadron, based in Cherbourg, although she was placed in reserve on 28 April 1869.

When the Franco-Prussian War began on 19 July 1870, the ship was mobilized and became the flagship of Vice Admiral (vice-amiral) Édouard Bouët-Willaumez's squadron that was tasked to blockade German ports in the Heligoland Bight. It departed Cherbourg on 24 July and, failing to find any German ships, proceeded to Danish waters to wait for further instructions. Bouët-Williaumez was ordered on 2 August to split his forces with half, including Surveillante, proceeding into the Baltic Sea to blockade the Prussian ports there under his command and the others to return to the Bight. On 22 August the Prussian unarmored corvette SMS Nymphe approached the anchored squadron in the Bay of Puck off Danzig (modern Gdansk, Poland) and fired two broadsides at the flagship at long range without result before she was chased off. The strong Prussian coastal defenses prevented any attack by the French ships, but their presence severely inhibited German shipping. Bouët-Willaumez was ordered to return to Cherbourg on 16 September where his squadron joined the ships blockading the Bight after their arrival on the 29th. By then the Prussians were besieging Paris and many of the trained gunners aboard the squadron were transferred to the city. The squadron resumed the blockade with reduced crews until December when smaller ships took it over. Surveillante lost her rudder during a storm on 12 October and had to be towed back to Cherbourg by her sister Guyenne. Bouët-Willaumez became sick a week later and had to haul down his flag.

The ship was paid off on 1 April 1871; despite this, she was rearmed with Modèle 1870 guns in 1873. Surveillante was reactivated on 18 March 1876 for service with the Squadron of Evolutions (Escadre d'évolution) of the Channel Division (Division de la Manche). In 1877 the ship was transferred to the Mediterranean Squadron during the Russo-Turkish War of 1877–1878. She ran aground near Golfe-Juan, France, on 1 February 1879, but was refloated the following day. Surveillante was placed in reserve at Toulon on 14 February, but was reactivated on 1 March 1880 for trials and was assigned to the Mediterranean Squadron the following month. During the French occupation of Tunisia in early 1881, the ship ferried 450 troops, some horses and a battery of mountain guns to Tabarka, Tunisia, on 27 April.

On 27 January 1882 she sailed for Brest and began a refit there on 8 May. Surveillante was placed in reserve on 3 July and transferred to Cherbourg in December. The ship was reactivated on 15 April 1883 for service with the Trials Division (Division d'essais), but this was disbanded on 27 May when some of its ships were needed to ferry French troops to Vietnam for the Tonkin Campaign. Surveillante returned to reserve on 16 June and was decommissioned on 5 November 1884. The ship was condemned on 13 May 1887, but remained in use as a guard ship at Cherbourg until she was stricken from the navy list in 1890. Surveillante then became a coal storeship until she was broken up for scrap in 1898.

== Bibliography ==
- de Balincourt, Captain & Vincent-Bréchignac, Captain (1975a). "The French Navy of Yesterday: Ironclad Frigates: Second Group – Provence Type". F.P.D.S. Newsletter. III (2): 9–13. OCLC 41554533.
- de Balincourt, Captain & Vincent-Bréchignac, Captain (1975b). "The French Navy of Yesterday: Ironclad Frigates, Part IV". F.P.D.S. Newsletter. III (4): 26–30. OCLC 41554533.
- Campbell, N. J. M. (1979). "France". In Chesneau, Roger & Kolesnik, Eugene M. (eds.). Conway's All the World's Fighting Ships 1860–1905. Greenwich, UK: Conway Maritime Press. pp. 282–333. ISBN 0-8317-0302-4.
- Gille, Eric (1999). Cent ans de cuirassés français [A Century of French Battleships] (in French). Nantes: Marines. ISBN 2-909-675-50-5.
- Roberts, Stephen S. (2021). French Warships in the Age of Steam 1859–1914: Design, Construction, Careers and Fates. Barnsley, UK: Seaforth Publishing. ISBN 978-1-5267-4533-0.
- Roche, Jean-Michel (2005). Dictionnaire des bâtiments de la flotte de guerre française de Colbert à nos jours [Dictionary of French Warships from Colbert to Today] (in French). Vol. Tome I: 1671–1870. Toulon: Group Retozel-Maury Millau. ISBN 978-2-9525917-0-6. OCLC 165892922.
- Silverstone, Paul H. (1984). Directory of the World's Capital Ships. New York: Hippocrene Books. ISBN 0-88254-979-0.
- Stenzel, Alfred (1900). "The Fleet and the Coast". In von Pfiugk-Harttung, Julius Albert Georg (ed.). The Franco-German War. London: Swan Sonnenschein and Co. OCLC 3788640.
- Wilson, H. W. (1896). Ironclads in Action: A Sketch of Naval Warfare From 1855 to 1895, with Some Account of the Development of the Battleship in England. Vol. 1. Boston: Little, Brown. OCLC 902936108.
- Winfield, Rif & Roberts, Stephen S. (2015). French Warships in the Age of Sail, 1786–1861. Barnsley, UK: Seaforth Publishing. ISBN 978-1-84832-204-2.
