= Ernest de Jonquières =

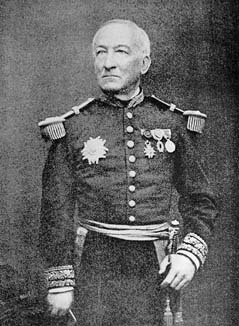

Ernest Jean Philippe Fauque de Jonquières (born Carpentras, France 3 July 1820; died Mousans-Sartoux, France 12 August 1901) was a French mathematician and naval officer who made several contributions in geometry.

Jonquières attended the naval school at Brest, and later joined the French Navy. in 1841 he became a lieutenant, and from 1849 to 1850 he served on the staff of the Admiral in Paris. During this time, Jonquières became a close associate of Michel Chasles, whose works he had studied. During his subsequent time at sea, he continued his mathematical studies, and won a part of the Grand Prix of the French Academy of Sciences in 1862.

In 1865, Jonquières became a captain and was sent to Saigon to organize a French agricultural and industrial exhibition. He played an important role in the development of current Vietnam as a French colony. Later, he was head of the local naval depot and its maps and plans. In 1874, Jonquières was made Vice-Admiral. He retired in 1885.
