= Martin Fourichon =

French naval officer, colonial administrator and politician

Léon Martin Fourichon
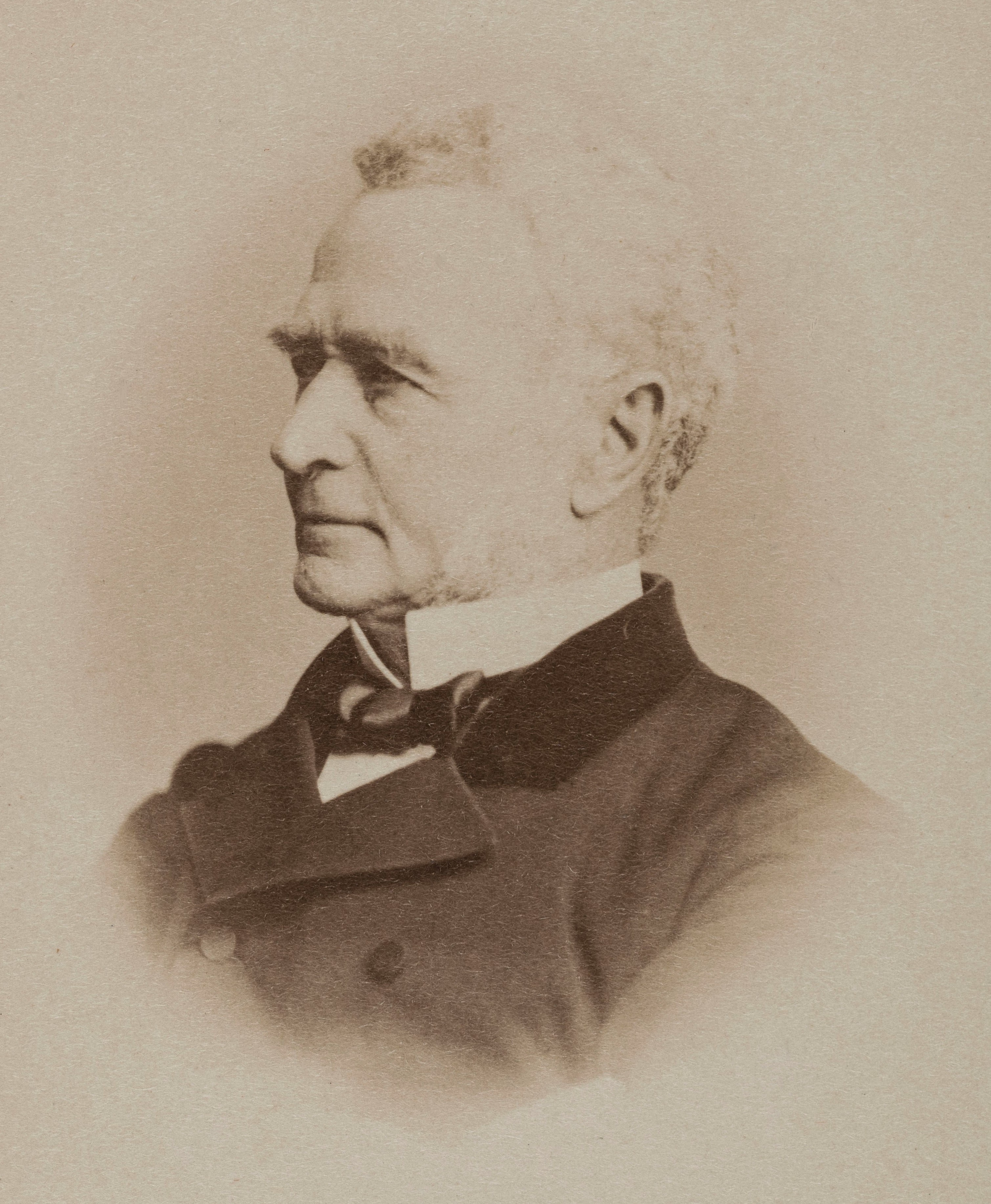

Minister for the Navy and the Colonies
- In office 1870–1871
- In office 1876–1877

Governor of French Guiana
- In office 1853–1854

Personal details
- Born: 10 January 1809 Thiviers, France
- Died: 24 November 1884 (aged 75) Paris, France
- Occupation: Naval officer, colonial administrator, politician

Military service
- Allegiance: France
- Branch/service: French Navy
- Rank: Vice-amiral

Léon Martin Fourichon (10 January 1809, Thiviers – 24 November 1884, Paris) was a French naval officer, colonial administrator and politician.

== Life ==
He entered the navy in 1824, rising to aspirant on 20 September 1826, enseigne de vaisseau on 19 March 1829, lieutenant de vaisseau on 16 May 1833, capitaine de frégate on 1 November 1843, capitaine de vaisseau on 22 July 1848, contre-amiral on 26 February 1853 and vice-amiral on 17 August 1859. He was kept on the active list indefinitely.

He was governor of French Guiana from 1853 to 1854 and Minister for the Navy and the Colonies from 1870 to 1871 and 1876 to 1877. He was also a deputy for the Dordogne from 1871 to 1876 and a 'sénateur inamovible' from 1876 to 1884. He belonged to the Orléanist parliamentary group, Centre droit.

== Bibliography ==
- Annuaire de la Marine et des Colonies 1 January 1881.
