= Édouard Bouët-Willaumez =

French admiral (1808–1871)

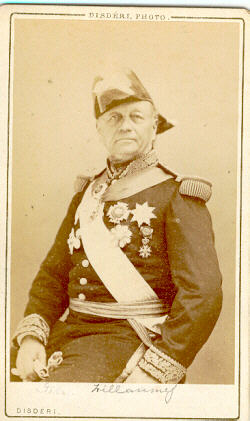
Louis Édouard Bouët-Willaumez.

Louis Édouard Bouët-Willaumez (24 April 1808 – 9 September 1871) was a French admiral.

== Early life ==
Louis Édouard Bouët was the son of a businessman (and mayor of Lambézellec), born in Maisons-Laffitte, near Paris. Having joined the French Navy in 1824 he embarked on a five-year voyage, first in the Mediterranean (where he saw action at the Battle of Navarino in 1827) and then in the Indian Ocean.

== Career ==
In 1829 he was promoted to ship's ensign and served in the Morea expedition. In 1830 he was part of the blockade and capture of Algiers, followed by the blockade of Antwerp. Made Lieutenant in 1834, he was attached to the naval post at La Plata, from where he was sent to Senegal. In 1836 he took command of the steamship L'Africain, with which he travelled 200 miles inland, up to the Félou Falls (les Chutes de Félou) in upper Senegal. He was the only Westerner to return alive, the others having succumbed to disease.

In 1838 Bouët took command of the brig La Malouine, which charted a trade route along the African coast. Along the way he punished a native group of seafarers that had plundered three trading ships and signed a commercial treaty with the king of Gabon in 1839. In July 1840 he carried out a reconnaissance of the bay of Mogador and established a plan of attack.

Promoted to lieutenant commander in 1840, on Le Misus, he took command of the Foreign Division of Africa from 1841 to 1842, when he was named provisional governor of Senegal. In 1843, Bouët began a period of expansion when he captured the port of Saint-Louis and allowed privately owned trading companies (mainly from Bordeaux) to handle the administration of the town; he also sent a new mission to Bambuk, and signed a commercial treaty with the ruler of Bundu. On 15 August 1844 he was attached to the expedition commanded by the Prince de Joinville, which took Mogador using the information that had been collected by Bouët. His reward was to take the trophies back to France, together with a promotion to captain.

In 1845 he was adopted by his uncle, Vice-Admiral Willaumez, whose name he took, and married the daughter of Admiral Lemorant — two events that opened new opportunities for him. In that same year, Bouët-Willaumez took command of the steamship Le Caraïbe at Lorient as Flag Captain to Admiral Montagniac de Rocque and served as Commander of the Naval Division of the Western Coast of Africa. There, he served as chief of staff of a squadron of twenty-six cruisers.

In 1848 he became commander of the Naval Division of the African Coast, on the frigate Pénélope (a frigate of the 3rd rank carrying 30-pounder cannons, it was laid down in 1830 and launched in 1840 and struck from lists in 1864). During this period he restored French sovereignty over Guinea, and was named Commander of the Légion d'honneur for courage shown during a bayonet-charge on land against rebellious tribes. He also took part in a diplomatic mission to negotiate the end of trade with England.

In 1853, promoted to rear admiral, he was named chief of staff of the Mediterranean squadron, under Admiral Hamelin. During the Crimean War he took part in the bombardment of Odessa and attacks on Sebastopol. He was made a commander of the Order of the Bath by the British government for his services during the war.

=== Second Italian War of Independance ===
In 1859, during the Second Italian War of Independence, Bouët-Willaumez commanded the French squadron in the Adriatic. After these operations, he was appointed to the committee responsible for coast defences, and oversaw works at the ports of Nice and Villefranche-sur-Mer, which became part of France at the end of the war. Promoted to vice admiral in 1860, he served as Maritime Prefect of Cherbourg, and in 1861 as Maritime Prefect at Toulon. He commanded the French Mediterranean Fleet in 1864 and was appointed to the Senate of France in 1865.

=== Franco-Prussian War ===
During the Franco-Prussian War of 1870, he was named to command a squadron intended to attack the Baltic coast in northern Germany, but French defeats on land put an end to these plans. Bouët-Willaumez died in 1871.

== Writings ==
- Commerce et traite des noirs aux côtes occidentales d'Afrique. Paris 1848)
- Campagnes aux côtes occidentales d'Afrique. Paris (1850)
- La Flotte francaise et les colonies en 1852. Paris (1855)
- Batailles de terre et de mer. Paris (1855)
- Tactique supplémentaire à l'usage d'une flotte cuirassée. Paris (1864)

== Sources and external links ==
- Amiral Bouet-Willaumez (in French)
- Julien, Félix (1872). L'amiral Bouët-Willaumez et l'expédition dans la Baltique (in French). H. Plon.
