= List of ship launches in 1864 =

The list of ship launches in 1864 includes a chronological list of some ships launched in 1864.

Date	Ship	Class	Builder	Location	Country	Notes
8 January	Jane Woodburn	Barque	John Blumer	Sunderland	United Kingdom	For Mr. McDonald.
9 January	Beaumaris Castle	East Indiaman	J. G. Lawrie	Whiteinch	United Kingdom	For private owner.
9 January	Margaret Wilkie	Barque	Adamson	Alloa	United Kingdom	For private owner.
11 January	Admiral	Cutter	Scallan	Ringsend	United Kingdom	For private owner.
11 January	Charlotte Anne	Schooner	John Roberts	Hirael	United Kingdom	For private owner.
11 January	Rosemont	Barque	James Hardie	Southwick	United Kingdom	For James Longton Jr. & Co.
11 January	Tugela	Clipper	Messrs. A. Hall & Co.	Footdee	United Kingdom	For John T. Rennie.
12 January	Furniss Abbey	Full-rigged ship	Messrs. Clover & Co.	Woodside	United Kingdom	For Messrs. Potter Bros.
15 January	Earl of Carlisle	Steamship	Messrs. Caird & Co.	Cartsdyke	United Kingdom	For Messrs. Lewis Potter & Co.
19 January	Greenock	Steamship	Messrs. J. & R. Swan	Kelvindock	United Kingdom	For Messrs. Murdoch & Doddrell.
21 January	Penguin	Steamship	G. & J. Burns	Glasgow	United Kingdom	For G. & J. Burns.
23 January	Hoang Ho	Clipper	Messrs. Alexander Stephen & Sons	Kelvinhaugh	United Kingdom	For private owner.
23 January	Pampero	Full-rigged ship	Messrs. Thomas Royden & Sons	Liverpool	United Kingdom	For Messrs. Hainsworth & Co and Messrs. T. H. Ismay & Co.
26 January	Demerara	Full-rigged ship	Messrs. M'Millan	Dumbarton	United Kingdom	For John Kerr.
26 January	Dumbarton	Paddle steamer	Messrs. W. Denny & Bros	Dumbarton	United Kingdom	For Messrs. T. A. Gibbs & Co.
26 January	Pembrokeshire	Full-rigged ship	Allen & Wharton	Pembroke Dock	United Kingdom	For David J. Jenkings & Co.
30 January	General Outram	Steamship	Messrs. Blackwood & Gordon	Port Glasgow	United Kingdom	For Bombay Coast and River Steam Navigation Company.
30 January	Roe	Paddle steamer	Messrs. Caird & Co.	Cartsdyke	United Kingdom	For Messrs. Burns.
January	Adèle	Steamship	Messrs. McNab & Co.	location	United Kingdom	For Messrs. Seligman & Co.
January	Atalanta	Barque		Gloucester	United Kingdom	For Messr. Ivens & Chessell.
January	Legion of Honour	Clipper			United Kingdom	For Black Ball Line.
January	Star of Scotia	Sailing ship	Harland & Wolff	Belfast	United Kingdom	For J. P. Corry & Co.
4 February	Milwaukee	Milwaukee-class monitor	Union Iron Works	Carondelet, Missouri	United States	For United States Navy.
6 February	Paragon	Steamship	Messrs. Palmer Bros.	Low Walker	United Kingdom	For private owner.
8 February	Canadian	Steamship	Messrs. Pile, Spence & Co	West Hartlepool	United Kingdom	For West India and Pacific Steamship Company.
9 February	Calabar	Steamship	Messrs. Randolph, Elder & Co.	Govan	United Kingdom	For African Mail Company.
9 February	Enterprise	Sloop-of-war	Royal Dockyard	Deptford	United Kingdom	For Royal Navy.
9 February	Robina	Sloop		Ayr	United Kingdom	For Mr. M'Creadie.
9 February	Talpoor	Steamship		Keamaree	(United Kingdom of Great Britain and Ireland) India	For private owner.
10 February	Bucentaur	Full-rigged ship	Messrs. Earle	Hull	United Kingdom	For Messrs. C. Saunders & Co.
10 February	Chickasaw	Milwaukee-class monitor	Gaylord, Son & Co.	St. Louis, Missouri	United States	For United States Navy.
10 February	Oriana	East Indiaman	Messrs. Scott & Co.	Greenock	United Kingdom	For William Orr.
10 February	Othello	Merchantman	Messrs. Johnson	Bideford	United Kingdom	For private owner.
11 February	Eastern Star	Merchantman	Messrs. Johnson	Bideford	United Kingdom	For Messrs. Popham & Co.
11 February	Viscata	Mercantman	Messrs. Hart & Sinott	Liverpool	United Kingdom	For Messrs. Steele.
16 February	Ahuriri	Steamship	Lawrie	Whiteinch	United Kingdom	For private owner.
22 February	Jamaica Packet	Steamship	Messrs. Lawrence Hill & Co	Port Glasgow	United Kingdom	For Messrs. Jamieson, Soutar & Co.
22 February	Knight Commander	Merchantman	Messrs. Walpole, Webb, & Bewley	Dublin	United Kingdom	For Messrs. Carlisle & Gallie.
23 February	Danmark	Ironclad	Messrs. J. & G. Thomson	Clydebank	United Kingdom	For Royal Danish Navy.
23 February	Van Capellen	Merchantman	Messrs. Thomas Vernon & Son	Liverpool	United Kingdom	For Messrs. Sandbach, Tinne & Co.
24 February	Tennessee	Steamship	Messrs. William Denny & Bros.	Dumbarton	United Kingdom	For private owner.
25 February	Marshal Keith	Schooner	Messrs.Carnegie & Matthew	Peterhead	United Kingdom	For James Scott and others.
27 February	Blue Light	Tug		Portsmouth Navy Yard	United States	For United States Navy.
27 February	Edmund Driggs	Pilot boat	Edward F. Williams	Greenpoint, New York	United States	For New York Pilots.
27 February	Lady Young	Paddle steamer	Messrs. A. & J. Inglis	Glasgow	United Kingdom	For Queensland Steam Navigation Company.
February	Othello	Brig	Messrs. Cox & Sons	Bideford	United Kingdom	For Messrs. Baine & Johnstone.
February	Star	Snow	Peter Austin	Sunderland	United Kingdom	For W. Kish.
February	W. H. Hasleden	Clipper	Messrs. Pearse & Co.	Stockton-on-Tees	United Kingdom	For White Star Line.
4 March	Amanda	Schooner	Morris Owen	Borth	United Kingdom	For private owner
7 March	Zealous	Ironclad		Pembroke Dockyard	United Kingdom	For Royal Navy.
8 March	Bolivian	Steamship	Messrs. Robinson & Co	Cork	United Kingdom	For West Indian and Pacific Steam Packet Company.
8 March	Port Fire	Tug		Portsmouth Navy Yard	United States	For United States Navy.
9 March	Edward Windus	Brigantine	W. Griffith	Borth	United Kingdom	For private owner.
9 March	Gael	Paddle steamer	Robertson & Co.	Greenock	United Kingdom	For Clyde and Campbeltown Steam Packet Joint Stock Company.
9 March	Great Western	Paddle steamer	Messrs. William Simons & Co.	Renfrew	United Kingdom	For Ford & Jackson.
9 March	United States	Paddle tugboat	J. T. Eltringham	South Shields	United Kingdom	For J. Dawson et al. Collided with the steamship Otter on being launched.
10 March	Ashley	Ironclad		Charleston, South Carolina	Confederate States of America	For Confederate States Navy.
12 March	Kickapoo	Milwaukee-class monitor	G. B. Allen & Co.	St. Louis, Missouri	United States	For United States Navy.
12 March	Ladye Love	Barque	William Patterson	Bristol	United Kingdom	For J. M. Gladstone.
13 March	Suwanee	Gunboat	Reaney, Son & Archbold	Chester, Pennsylvania	United States	For United States Navy.
15 March	Nineveh	Clipper	Messrs. Walter Hood & Co.	Aberdeen	United Kingdom	For Messrs. George Thompson Jr., & Co.
19 March	Pawtuxet	Sassacus-class gunboat		Portsmouth Navy Yard	United States	For United States Navy.
19 March	Yantic	Gunboat		Philadelphia Navy Yard	United States	For United States Navy.
22 March	Gerona	Screw frigate	Arsenal de Cartagena	Cartagena	Spain	For Spanish Navy.
22 March	Latnik	Uragan-class monitor	Carr and MacPherson	Saint Petersburg	Russia	For Imperial Russian Navy.
23 March	Chipchase	Steamship	Messrs. J. Wigham Richardson	Low Walker	United Kingdom	For Shields Steam Shipping Company.
24 March	Bronenosets	Uragan-class monitor	Carr and MacPherson	Saint Petersburg	Russia	For Imperial Russian Navy.
24 March	City of Foo Chow	East Indiaman	Messrs. Barclay, Curle & Co.	Stobcross	United Kingdom	For Messrs. George Smith & Sons.
24 March	Eastham	Barque	Mackern	Preston	United Kingdom	For Messrs. E. Tennant & Co.
24 March	Ianda	Barque	Robinson	Liverpool	United Kingdom	For Mr. Wilkinson and others.
24 March	Marmion	Merchantman		Port Glasgow	United Kingdom	For Messrs. Williamson, Milligan & Co.
24 March	Mooresfort	Full-rigged ship	Cork Steamship Company	Cork	United Kingdom	For Messrs. Charles Moore & Co.
25 March	Ivanhoe	Paddle steamer	Messrs. Scott & Co.	Greenock	United Kingdom	For private owner.
25 March	Let Her Rip	Paddle steamer	Messrs. Kirkpatrick, M'Intyre & Co.	Glasgow	United Kingdom	For Henry Lafone.
26 March	Fox	Paddle steamer	Messrs. Caird & Co.	Greenock	United Kingdom	For Joseph Fry.
26 March	Avalon	Paddle steamer	Messrs. J. & W. Dudgeon	Cubitt Town	United Kingdom	For Great Eastern Railway.
26 March	Helen	Yacht	Samuel White	Cowes	United Kingdom	For Marqess of Conyngham.
26 March	Jérome Napoleon	Royal yacht		Le Havre	France	For Prince Napoléon.
26 March	The Goolwa	Clipper	Messrs. Alexander Hall & Co.	Aberdeen	United Kingdom	For Messrs. Anderson, Thompson & Co.
27 March	Ryūjō	Ironclad	Alexander Hall and Sons	Aberdeen	United Kingdom	For Imperial Japanese Navy.
29 March	Emma	Steamship	Messrs. M'Nab & Co.	Greenock	United Kingdom	For private owner.
29 March	Grenada	Merchantman	Messrs A. M'William & Sons	Dumbarton	United Kingdom	For John Kerr.
March	Alexander	Whaler		Dundee	United Kingdom	For private owner.
March	Columbia	Ironclad	John L. Porter	Charleston, South Carolina	Confederate States of America	For Confederate States Navy.
March	E. Pluribus Eunum	Full-rigged Ship		Thomaston, Maine	United States	For private owner.
March	Fox	Steamship	Messrs. Caird & Co.	Greenock	United Kingdom	For Messrs. Burns.
March	Lilian	Paddle steamer	Messrs. Thompson & Co	Glasgow	United Kingdom	For private owner.
March	Macedon	Steamship	Messrs. C. Connell & Co.	Overnewton	United Kingdom	For R. Little.
March	Phoenix	Floating battery	Confederate Naval Works	Selma, Alabama	Confederate States of America	For Confederate States Navy.
March	Rose	Schooner	Francis Beddoe	Pembroke	United Kingdom	For Francis Beddoe.
March	Shah Zadee	Clipper	Messrs. Charles Connell & Co.	Glasgow	United Kingdom	For private owner.
March	Wild Wave	Brig	J. & R. Bailey	Shoreham-by-Sea	United Kingdom	For Gates & Co.
6 April	John Allan	Full-rigged ship	W. Briggs & Sons	Sunderland	United Kingdom	For John Allan & Sons.
7 April	Galileo	Steamship	Messrs. Andrew Leslie & Co	Hebburn	United Kingdom	For Messrs. Lamport & Holt and Messrs. Rathbone, Bros., & Co.
7 April	The South Australian	Steamship	Key	Kinghorn	United Kingdom	For private owner.
8 April	Glengyle	Paddle steamer	Messrs. William Denny & Bros.	Dumbarton	United Kingdom	For Messrs. Jardine, Mathieson & Co.
8 April	Vivid	Paddle steamer	Messrs. Barclay, Curle & Co.	Stobcross	United Kingdom	For Messrs. Campbell.
9 April	Adria	Steamship	Backhouse & Dixon	Middlesbrough	United Kingdom	For London, Italian and Adriatic Steam Navigation Company.
9 April	Dawn	Yacht	Johnston	Carrickfergus	United Kingdom	For Marriott Robert Dalway.
9 April	Kentucky	Steamship	Archibald Denny	Dumbarton	United Kingdom	For private owner.
9 April	Kingston	Steamship	Messrs. M. Samuelson & Co.	Hull	United Kingdom	For private owner.
9 April	Ta Pang Nyo	Steamship	Messrs. Blackwood & Gordon	Port Glasgow	United Kingdom	For Messrs. Trautmann & Co.
12 April	John and Mary	Merchantman	E. S. Trenery	Gainsborough	United Kingdom	For John Hunt.
13 April	Catawba	Canonicus-class monitor	Alexander Swift & Co.	Cincinnati, Ohio	United States	For United States Navy.
16 April	Royal Sovereign	Clipper	W. Patterson	Bristol	United Kingdom	For Messrs. Fernie, Bros., & Co.
21 April	Kaffraria	Steamship	J. Laing & Son	Sunderland	United Kingdom	For Ryrie & Co.
21 April	Tararua	Steamship	Gourlay Brothers	Dundee	United Kingdom	For Union Steam Ship Company.
23 April	Alexandrina	Clipper	John Smith	Aberdeen	United Kingdom	For private owner.
23 April	Baroda	Clipper	Harland & Wolff	Belfast	United Kingdom	For T. & J. Brocklebank.
23 April	Carioca	Clipper	Messrs. R. & J. Evans & Co.	Liverpool	United Kingdom	For Messrs. E. C. Friend & Co.
23 April	Clytemnestra	Clipper	Messrs. Jones, Quiggin & Co.	Liverpool	United Kingdom	For Messrs Johes, Palmer & Co.
23 April	Gurupy	Paddle steamer	Messrs. W. C. Miller & Son	Liverpool	United Kingdom	For Maranham Steampacket Company.
23 April	Hamilla Mitchell	Clipper	Messrs. Dennh & Rankin	Dumbarton	United Kingdom	For John Mitchell.
23 April	New Hampshire	Storeship		Portsmouth Navy Yard	United States	For United States Navy.
23 April	Tea Taster	Clipper		Quebec	(United Kingdom of Great Britain and Ireland) Province of Canada	For private owner.
23 April	Zealous	Paddle steamer	Messrs. J. & W. Dudgeon	Cubitt Town	United Kingdom	For Great Eastern Railway.
25 April	Eagle	Paddle steamer	Messrs. C. Connell & Co.	Glasgow	United Kingdom	For Mr. Buchanan.
25 April	Imperatrice Eugénie	Steamship	John Scott	Saint-Nazaire	France	For Compagnie Générale Transatlantique.
26 April	Finmarken	Steamship	Messrs. Samuelson & Co.	Hull	United Kingdom	For private owner.
26 April	Janet Ferguson	Clipper	Messrs. Alexander Stephen & Sons	Kelvinhaugh	United Kingdom	For Messrs. Bain Bros.
27 April	Leven	Paddle steamer	Clyde Shipbuilding Co.	Glasgow	United Kingdom	For Dumbarton Steamboat Company.
30 April	Lac La Belle	Lake freighter	Ira Lafrinier	Cleveland, Ohio	United States	For Robert Hanna & Co.
30 April	Nil II	Steamship	Forges et Chantiers de la Méditerranée	La Seyne	France	For Cie. des Messageries Maritimes
April	Angelique	Full-rigged ship	P. V. Valin	Quebec	(United Kingdom of Great Britain and Ireland) Province of Canada	For private owner.
April	Derwent	Steamship	Messrs. A. & J. Inglis	Pointhouse	United Kingdom	For Tasmanian Steam Navigation Company.
April	Lesbia	Yacht	Wanhill	Poole	United Kingdom	For D. J. Penney.
April	Little Hattie	Paddle steamer	Messrs. J. & G. Thompson	Govan	United Kingdom	For private owner.
April	Matilda	Steamship	Henderson, Coulborn & Co	Renfrew	United Kingdom	For private owner.
April	Red Gauntlet	Paddle steamer	Messrs. Scott & Co.	Greenock	United Kingdom	For private owner.
April	Skerryvore	Barque	W. Chilton	Sunderland	United Kingdom	For Foreman & Co.
April	Volador	Sailing ship	Harland & Wolff	Belfast	United Kingdom	For G. Lomer.
3 May	Transit	Steamship	Messrs. J. W. Richardson & Co.	Low Walker	United Kingdom	For private owner.
5 May	Alexandria	Barque	W. Briggs & Sons	Sunderland	United Kingdom	For Wood & Son.
5 May	Beatrice	Paddle steamer	Clyde Shipbuilding Company	Glasgow	United Kingdom	For private owner.
5 May	Chimo	Casco-class monitor	Aquila Adams Co.	South Boston, Massachusetts	United States	For United States Navy.
5 May	Lennox	Paddle steamer	Clyde Shipbuilding Company	Glasgow	United Kingdom	For private owner.
5 May	Mandarin	Full-rigged ship	J. & J. Samson	Quebec	(United Kingdom of Great Britain and Ireland) Province of Canada	For private owner.
5 May	Platypus	Steamship	Messrs. A. & J. Inglis	Pointhouse	United Kingdom	For Queensland Steam Navigation Company.
6 May	Clutha	Steamship	Messrs. Barclay, Curle & Co.	Stobcross	United Kingdom	For Carron Company.
6 May	Tonawanda	Miantonomoh-class monitor		Philadelphia Navy Yard	United States	For United States Navy.
7 May	Banshee	Cutter	Messrs. John Quiggan & Co.	Liverpool	United Kingdom	For private owner.
7 May	Carlisle	Merchantman	Middleton	Hartlepool	United Kingdom	For Messrs. Richard Nicholson & Co.
7 May	Chancellor	Paddle steamer	Messrs. Blackwood & Gordon	Port Glasgow	United Kingdom	For private owner.
7 May	City of Adelaide	Clipper	Pile, Hay & Co	Sunderland	United Kingdom	For Bruce, Moore, Harrold Bros., & Martin.
7 May	Glenduror	East Indiaman	Messrs. Robert Duncan & Co.	Liverpool	United Kingdom	For Messrs. C. G. Cowie & Co.
7 May	Norseman	Steamship	Union Shipbuilding Company	Kelvinhaugh	United Kingdom	For private owner.
7 May	Prince Cadwgan	Paddle steamer	Union Shipbuilding Company	Kelvinhaugh	United Kingdom	For private owner.
8 May	Koldun	Uragan-class monitor	John Cockerill & Cie.	Seraing	Belgium	For Imperial Russian Navy.
8 May	Veschun	Uragan-class monitor	John Cockerill & Cie.	Seraing	Belgium	For Imperial Russian Navy.
9 May	Alert	Cutter	Ratsey	Cowes	United Kingdom	For private owner.
10 May	Iona	Paddle steamer	Messrs. J. & G. Thomson	Clydebank	United Kingdom	For David Hutcheson & Co.
11 May	Clio	Steamship	Messrs. C. & W. Earle	Hull	United Kingdom	For Messrs. Thomas Wilson, Sons, & Co.
11 May	Douglas	Paddle steamer	Messrs. Caird & Co.	Greenock	United Kingdom	For Isle of Man Steam Packet Company.
17 May	Kilmeny	Cutter	Fyfe	Fairlie	United Kingdom	For A. Finlay.
17 May	Mahopac	Canonicus-class monitor	Secor & Co.	Jersey City, New Jersey	United States	For United States Navy.
19 May	Egmont	Steamship	Henderson, Coulborn & Co	Renfrew	United Kingdom	For private owner.
20 May	Punjaub	Steamship	Messrs. W. Denny & Bros.	Dumbarton	United Kingdom	For British India Steam Navigation Company.
21 May	Fox	Pilot boat	Messrs. R. Smith & Co.	Grimsby	United Kingdom	For Trinity House.
21 May	Madras	Steamship	Messrs. W. Simons & Co.	Renfrew	United Kingdom	For British India Steam Navigation Company.
21 May	Oneota	Canonicus-class monitor	Alexander Swift & Co.	Cincinnati, Ohio	United States	For United States Navy.
23 Mary	Bolton Abbey	East Indiaman		Birkenhead	United Kingdom	For Messrs. Potter Bros.
23 May	Prince Albert	Coastal defence ship	Samuda Brothers	Cubitt Town	United Kingdom	For Royal Navy.
23 May	Ravensbury	Paddle steamer	Messrs. J. & W. Dudgeon	Cubitt Town	United Kingdom	For Great Eastern Railway.
24 May	Sprite	Paddle steamer	Messrs. W. C. Miller & Son	Liverpool	United Kingdom	For Mersey River Steamboat Company.
24 May	Sylph	Paddle steamer	Messrs. W. C. Miller & Son	Liverpool	United Kingdom	For Mersey River Steamboat Company.
25 May	Colonel Lamb	Paddle steamer	Messrs. Jones Quiggin & Co.	Liverpool	United Kingdom	For William Quiggin.
27 May	Uragan	Uragan-class monitor	New Admiralty Shipyard	Saint Petersburg	Russia	For Imperial Russian Navy.
28 May	Alexander	Paddle steamer	Messrs. Henderson, Coulborn & Co	Renfrew	United Kingdom	For private owner.
29 May	Batterie N° 6	Batterie N° 6-class	Forges et Chantiers de la Méditerranée	La Seyne	France	For French Navy.
31 May	Batterie N° 7	Batterie N° 6-class	Forges et Chantiers de la Méditerranée	La Seyne	France	For French Navy.
May	Alecto	Barque	T. E. Miledge	Saint John	(United Kingdom of Great Britain and Ireland) Colony of New Brunswick	For private owner.
May	Casco	Casco-class monitor	Atlantic Works	Boston, Massachusetts	United States	For United States Navy.
May	Ella	Paddle steamer	Messrs. W. Denny & Bros	Dumbarton	United Kingdom	For private owner.
May	Indian Chief	Full-rigged ship	P. V. Valin	Quebec	(United Kingdom of Great Britain and Ireland) Province of Canada	For private owner.
May	Jessie Duncan	Barque		New York	United States	For private owner.
May	Lily of the Valley	Barque	W. H. Pearson	Pallion	United Kingdom	For Messrs. W. H. Watson & Sons.
May	Manfred	Full-rigged ship	J. Robinson	Deptford	United Kingdom	For J. Clay.
May	Mohave I	Sternwheeler	John Gunder North	San Francisco, California	United States	For George A. Johnson Company.
May	Omonia	Steamship	Greek Steam Company	Syros	Greece	For Greek Steam Company.
May	Queen of the Lakes	Full-rigged ship	Messrs. Patterson & Shaw	Quebec	(United Kingdom of Great Britain and Ireland) Province of Canada	For private owner.
May	Rhoda	Full-rigged ship	W. G. Russell	Quebec	(United Kingdom of Great Britain and Ireland) Province of Canada	For private owner.
May	River Wear	Clipper	William Doxford	Pallion	United Kingdom	For Hargrove & Co.
May	Shanghae	Warship		Nantes	France	For Confederate States Navy.
May	Teresa	Schooner	Mr. Besant	Weymouth	United Kingdom	For R. Damen.
May	Venetia	Steamship	Messrs. C. Mitchell & Co.	Newcastle upon Tyne	United Kingdom	For London, Italian and Adriatic Steam Navigation Company.
2 June	Cawarra	Paddle steamer	Messrs. A. & J. Inglis	Glasgow	United Kingdom	For Australasian Steam Navigation Company.
2 June	Edinorog	Uragan-class monitor	Galernyi Island Shipyard	Saint Petersburg	Russia	For Imperial Russian Navy.
2 June	Strelets	Uragan-class monitor	Galernyi Island Shipyardd	Saint Petersburg	Russia	For Imperial Russian Navy.
2 June	Batterie N° 8	Batterie N° 6-class	Forges et Chantiers de la Méditerranée	La Seyne	France	For French Navy.
3 June	Cordova	Steamship	Neptune Foundry	Waterford	United Kingdom	For Malcolmson Bros.
4 June	Batterie N° 9	Batterie N° 6-class	Forges et Chantiers de la Méditerranée	La Seyne	France	For French Navy.
4 June	Blair Athol	Merchantman	Taylor & Scouter	Sunderland	United Kingdom	For Mr. Avery.
4 June	Howrah	Merchantman	Messrs. Pile, Spence & Co.	Sunderland	United Kingdom	For Messrs. Tyser & Haviside.
4 June	Rosario	Steamship	Messrs. Malcolmson	Waterford	United Kingdom	For private owner.
4 June	Sir David	Steamship	Messrs. Barclay, Curle & Co.	Whiteinch	United Kingdom	For Montreal Ocean Steamship Company.
4 June	Tunxis	Casco-class monitor	Reaney, Son & Archbold	Chester, Pennsylvania	United States	For United States Navy.
4 June	Zemindar	East Indiaman	Messrs. Holderness & Chilton	Liverpool	United Kingdom	For Messrs. Chapple & Hutton.
6 June	Nyanza	Paddle steamer	Thames Ironworks	Blackwall	United Kingdom	For Peninsular and Oriental Steam Navigation Company.
6 June	Batterie N° 10	Batterie N° 6-class	Forges et Chantiers de la Méditerranée	La Seyne	France	For French Navy.
6 June	Batterie N° 11	Batterie N° 6-class	Forges et Chantiers de la Méditerranée	La Seyne	France	For French Navy.
7 June	Guy Mannering	Merchantman	Messrs. John Reid & Co.	Port Glasgow	United Kingdom	For Messrs. Williamson, Milligan & Co.
7 June	Stratton Audley	Merchantman	Messrs. Robert Duncan & Co.	Port Glasgow	United Kingdom	For Messrs. Glen & Anderson.
7 June	The Erin	Steamship	Messrs. Kirkpatrick & M'Intyre	Belfast	United Kingdom	For private owner.
8 June	Gossamer	Chinaman	Messrs. A. Stephen & Sons	Kelvinhaugh	United Kingdom	For Messrs. Potter Bros.
8 June	Lava	Uragan-class monitor	Semiannikov & Poletika	Saint Petersburg	United Kingdom	For Imperial Russian Navy.
8 June	Mary Bowers	Paddle steamer	Messrs. William Simons & Co.	Renfrew	United Kingdom	For L. G. Bowers, Harry Lafone and others.
11 June	Juno	Steamship	Messrs. D. & W. Earle	Hull	United Kingdom	For private owner.
12 June	Flandre	Provence-class ironclad	Arsenal de Cherbourg	Cherbourg	France	For French Navy.
18 June	Erin	Steamship	Messrs. Palmer Bros.	Jarrow	United Kingdom	For National Steam Navigation Company.
20 June	Luzon	Paddle steamer	Messrs. A. Stephen & Co.	Kelvinhaugh	United Kingdom	For Messrs. Ker, Bolton & Co.
21 June	Beagle	Steamship	Messrs. Tod & MacGregor	Glasgow	United Kingdom	For Messrs. Burns.
21 June	Fontenay	Full-rigged ship	Messrs. G. S. Moore & Co.	Sunderland	United Kingdom	For Messrs. G. L. Munro & Co.
21 June	Izzedin	Paddle steamer	Thames Iron Shipbuilding Co.	Blackwall	United Kingdom	For Ottoman Navy.
21 June	British Queen	Schooner	William Allsup	Preston	United Kingdom	For James Ashcroft.
21 June	Owl	Paddle steamer	Quiggan, Jones & Co.	Liverpool	United Kingdom	For private owner.
21 June	Sphinx	Ironclad	Arman Frères	Bordeaux	France	For Confederate States Navy, but sale prohibited by French Government. Sold to Denmark as Stærkodder.
21 June	Torch	Cutter	Fyfe	Fairlie	United Kingdom	For J. Finlay.
22 June	Jane Bell	Brig	Messrs. Menzies & Co.	Leith	United Kingdom	For George Thompson.
22 June	Sam Cearns	Steamship	Messrs. Scott & Co.	Cartsdyke	United Kingdom	For White Star Line.
22 June	Talisman	Paddle steamer	Messrs. Scott & Sons	Greenock	United Kingdom	For Albion Trading Co.
23 June	County of Renfrew	East Indiaman	Messrs. Charles Connell & Co	Overnewton	United Kingdom	For Messrs. R. & J. Craig.
23 June	Cowasjee Jehangeer	Merchantman	Messrs. Hart & Sinnott	Liverpool	United Kingdom	For Messrs. Finlay, Campbell & Co.
23 June	Huasquina	Merchantman	Harrington and Workington Shipbuilding Company	Workington	United Kingdom	For private owner.
23 June	Marian	East Indiaman	Humber Iron Shipbuilding Company	Hull	United Kingdom	For private owner.
23 June	Ne Tron Menia	Pervenets-class ironclad	Charles Mitchell	Saint Petersburg	Russia	For Imperial Russian Navy.
23 June	Smerch	Monitor	Admiralty Shipyard	Saint Petersburg	Russia	For Imperial Russian Navy.
23 June	The Night Hawk	Paddle steamer	Messrs. Mackern	Preston	United Kingdom	For M. I. Wilson.
27 June	Tifon	Uragan-class monitor	New Admiralty Shipyard	Saint Petersburgh	Russia	For Imperial Russian Navy.
28 June	Biddick	Steamship	James Laing	Deptford	United Kingdom	For Henry T. Morton.
28 June	Louisa Darrock	Sloop	Richard Thomas	Conway	United Kingdom	For private owner.
30 June	Perun	Uragan-class monitor	Semiannikov & Poletika	Saint Petersburg	Russia	For Imperial Russian Navy.
June	Cheops	Ironclad	Arman Frères	Bordeaux	France	For Confederate States Navy.
June	Excelsior	Barque		Moneton	(United Kingdom of Great Britain and Ireland) Colony of New Brunswick	For private owner.
June	Glen Udal	Barque	James Robinson	Sunderland	United Kingdom	For Mr. Templeton.
June	Lanarkshire	Full-rigged ship	Louis Labbé	Quebec	(United Kingdom of Great Britain and Ireland) Province of Canada	For private owner.
June	Maythorn	Barque	P. V. Valin	Quebec	(United Kingdom of Great Britain and Ireland) Province of Canada	For private owner.
2 July	Anna Liffey	Steamship	Messrs. Walpole, Webb & Bewley	Dublin	United Kingdom	For private owner.
2 July	Puritan	Ironclad	Continental Iron Works	Greenpoint, New York	United States	For United States Navy.
4 July	Lamar	Paddle steamer	Archibald Denny	Dumbarton	United Kingdom	For private owner.
4 July	Warsaw	Steamship	Messrs. M'Nab & Co	Greenock	United Kingdom	For Leith, Hull & Hamburg Steam Navigation Company.
5 July	Favorite	Ironclad-converted Jason-class corvette		Deptford Dockyard	United Kingdom	For Royal Navy.
5 July	Helen	Barque	Messrs. Steele & Co	Greenock	United Kingdom	For John Gilchrist.
5 July	Inchdairnie	Barque	Watt	Dysart	United Kingdom	For private owners.
5 July	Moravian	Steamship	Messrs. Steele & Co.	Greenock	United Kingdom	For Montreal Ocean Steamship Company.
5 July	Oriental	Chinaman	E. Rust	Great Yarmouth	United Kingdom	For private owner.
5 July	Silver Craig	Barque	W. Briggs & Son	Sunderland	United Kingdom	For Mr. Sproat.
7 July	Pandora	Merchantman	Messrs. Charles Connell & Co.	Overnewton	United Kingdom	For Messrs. Henry Moore & Co.
9 July	Mohongo	Mohongo-class gunboat	Zeno Secon & Co.	Jersey City, New Jersey	United States	For United States Navy.
9 July	Norval	East Indiaman	Messrs. A. M'Millan & Son	Dumbarton	United Kingdom	For W. Grieve.
12 July	Clara	Steamship	Messrs. Alexander Stephen & Sons	Kelvinhaugh	United Kingdom	For private owner.
12 July	Helen Denny	Paddle steamer	Messrs. A. & J. Inglis	Pointhouse	United Kingdom	For private owner.
13 July	Jerna	Yacht	Messrs. Robinson & Co.	Cork	United Kingdom	For John Penrose.
16 July	Caldbeck	Clipper	Messrs. Walpole, Webb & Bewley	Dublin	United Kingdom	For private owner.
18 July	Almansa	Screw frigate	Reales Astilleros de Esteiro	Ferrol	Spain	For Spanish Navy.
20 July	Arran Castle	Steamship	Messrs. Kilpatrick & M'Intyre	Glasgow	United Kingdom	For Mr. Watson.
20 July	Cuba	Steamship	Messrs. Tod & MacGregor	Glasgow	United Kingdom	For Cunard Line.
20 July	London	Steamship	Money Wigram & Sons	Blackwall Yard	United Kingdom	For Money Wigram & Sons.
20 July	Star of Albion	Sailing ship	Harland & Wolff	Belfast	United Kingdom	For J. P. Corry & Co.
21 July	Ammonoosuc	Frigate		Boston Navy Yard	United States	For United States Navy.
21 July	Die Vernon	Merchantman	Messrs. Robert Duncan & Co.	Port Glasgow	United Kingdom	For Fleur de Lis Line.
21 July	Eblana	East Indiaman	Messrs. Laird Bros.	Birkenhead	United Kingdom	For Messrs. Brooke & Worthington.
21 July	Lady Darling	Steamship	Messrs. Potter Bros.	Liverpool	United Kingdom	For Messrs. Gibbs, Bright & Co.
21 July	Lily of the West	Steam yacht	John Smith	Aberdeen	United Kingdom	For private owner.
22 July	Europe	Steamship	Messrs. Scott & Co.	Greenock	United Kingdom	For Compagnie Générale Transatlantique.
22 July	Emily	Smack	E. Hunt	Aldeburgh	United Kingdom	For W. Fisher.
23 July	Adelina	Barque	Messrs. Mitchell's	Low Walker	United Kingdom	For Messrs. Beckwith & Co.
23 July	Eiver	Merchantman	Messrs. G. R. Clover & Co.	Woodside	United Kingdom	For Henry Barnes.
23 July	Ironsides	Lake freighter	Ira Lafrinier, or Quayle & Martin	Cleveland, Ohio	United Kingdom	For John E. Turner.
23 July	Lammermuir	Full-rigged ship	Pile, Spence & Co.	West Hartlepool	United Kingdom	For J. & R. Dunbar Willis.
23 July	Oruro	Barque	Messrs. Bowdler, Chaffer & Co.	Seacombe	United Kingdom	For Messrs. J. B. Walmsley & Co.
23 July	Rajpore	Merchantman	Messrs. Thomas Vernon & Co.	Liverpool	United Kingdom	For private owner.
23 July	San Miguel	Merchantman	Woodside Graving Dock Co. (Limited)	Birkenhead	United Kingdom	For Messrs. Bromham & Lewis.
25 July	The Mog	Humber Keel	Messrs. Hazlehurst & Son	Hull	United Kingdom	For Messrs. Bannister & Dyson.
30 July	Victoria	Monitor			Peru	For Peruvian Navy.
July	Bowfell	Full-rigged ship	T. & J. Brocklebank	Whitehaven	United Kingdom	For T. & R. Brocklebank.
July	City of Richmond	Full-rigged ship	T. C. Lee	Quebec	(United Kingdom of Great Britain and Ireland) Province of Canada	For private owner.
July	Hesperia	Barque	William Doxford	Sunderland	United Kingdom	For Edward Jarvis.
July	Lady Stirling	Paddle steamer	James Ash	Cubitt Town	United Kingdom	For private owner.
July	Lamar	Paddle steamer	A. Denny	Dumbarton	United Kingdom	For private owner.
July	Payta	Paddle steamer	Messrs. Randolph, Elder & Co.	Govan	United Kingdom	For Pacific Steam Navigation Company.
July	Spirit of the Morning	Barque	T. R. Oswald	Sunderland	United Kingdom	For Cunard & Co.
Unknown date	Swallow	Schooner	John Banks	Kilpin Pike	United Kingdom	For John Banks.
July	Warsaw	Steamship	Messrs. M'Nab & Co	Greenock	United Kingdom	For Leith, Hull & Hamburg Steam Navigation Company.
1 August	Sappho	Steamship	Messrs. Earle	Hull	United Kingdom	For Messrs. T. Wilson, Sons, & Co.
3 August	Julia	Steamship	Messrs. M'Nab & Co	Greenock	United Kingdom	For Messrs. Seligman & Co.
3 August	Tartar	Paddle steamer	Messrs. Henderson, Coulborn & Co.	Renfrew	United Kingdom	For private owner.
3 August	Torpid	Yacht	Messrs. Day & Co.	Northam, Southampton	United Kingdom	For T. Seddon.
4 August	Armstrong	Paddle steamer	Messrs. Thomas Wingate & Co.	Whiteinch	United Kingdom	For private owner.
4 August	Stormy Petrel	Paddle steamer	Messrs. William Simons & Co.	Renfrew	United Kingdom	For private owner.
6 August	Eliza Reed	Schooner	W. Read	Ipswich	United Kingdom	For private owner.
6 August	Miranda	Barque	Messrs. G. C. Hutchinson & Co.	Newcastle upon Tyne	United Kingdom	For Messrs. Robert Beckwith & Co.
6 August	Stag	Paddle Steamer	Messrs. Bowdler, Chaffer & Co.	Seacombe	United Kingdom	For Richard Phillips.
8 August	Michel	Paddle steamer	Messrs. Henderson, Coulborn & Co.	Renfrew	United Kingdom	For private owner.
12 August	Sevastopol	Ironclad	Cronstadt Shipyard	Kronstadt	Russia	For Imperial Russian Navy.
17 August	Hattie	Paddle steamer	Messrs. Scott & Co, or Messrs. Caird & Co.	Cartsdyke or Cartsdyke	United Kingdom	For Wemyss Bay Railway Company.
17 August	Useful	Schooner	J. Gibson	Fleetwood	United Kingdom	For private owner.
18 August	Argyll	Steamship	Messrs. Barclay, Curle & Co.	Stobcross	United Kingdom	For Messrs. Cowan & Co, Messrs. John Warroc & Co., and others.
18 August	Danzig	Steamship	Messrs. Barclay, Curle & Co.	Whiteinch	United Kingdom	For Leith, Hull, and Hamburg Steam Packet Company.
18 August	Princess Helena	Steamship	John Kay	Kinghorn	United Kingdom	For private owner.
18 August	Propontis	Steamship	London & Glasgow Engineering & Iron Shipbuilding Company	Govan	United Kingdom	For Messrs. W. H. & C. E. Dixon.
18 August	Surveillante	Provence-class ironclad			France	For French Navy.
18 August	Valeureuse	Provence-class ironclad			France	For French Navy.
18 August	Vulture	Paddle steamer	Messrs. Aitken & Mansel	Whiteinch	United Kingdom	For private owner.
19 August	Magnanime	Provence-class ironclad	Arsenal de Brest	Brest	France	For French Navy.
20 August	Arminius	Ironclad	Messrs. Samuda Bros.	Cubitt Town	United Kingdom	For Prussian Navy.
20 August	Altcar	East Indiaman	Messrs. Jones, Quiggan & Co.	Liverpool	United Kingdom	For Messrs. C. S. Lemon & Co.
20 August	Gunga	Steamship	Messrs. Earle & Co.	Hull	United Kingdom	For Bombay and Bengal Steam Navigation Co.
20 August	Island Queen	Steamship	Messrs. Irvine, Currie & Co.	West Hartlepool	United Kingdom	For Messrs. Pile, Spence & Co.
20 August	Spartan	Steamship	Messrs. A. Stephen & Sons	Kelvinhaugh	United Kingdom	For Robert Little.
20 August	Qua Lee	Barque	Messrs. Holdernsess & Chilton	Liverpool	United Kingdom	For Messrs. Trautmann, Mann & Co.
20 August	Ta Lee	Barque	Messrs. Holdernsess & Chilton	Liverpool	United Kingdom	For Messrs. Trautmann, Mann & Co.
20 August	Winnipec	Mohongo-class gunboat	Harrison Loring	Boston, Massachusetts	United States	For United States Navy.
22 August	Albert Victor	East Indiaman	Messrs. Robert Steele & Co.	Greenock	United Kingdom	For Jamsetjee Jejebhoy and Cursetjee Furdoonjee.
24 August	The Perthshire Lassie	Steamship	Union Shipbuilding Company	Kelvinhaugh	United Kingdom	For private owner.
31 August	Carham	Paddle steamer	Messrs. A. & J. Inglis	Pointhouse	United Kingdom	For North British Railway.
31 August	Stanley	Paddle steamer	Messrs. Caird & Co.	Greenock	United Kingdom	For London and North Western Railway.
31 August	Susan Beirne	Paddle steamer	Messrs. Aitken & Mansel	Whiteinch	United Kingdom	For private owner.
August	Bebside	Steamship	Messrs. J. Wigham Richardson & Co.	Low Walker	United Kingdom	For George Jobling.
August	Kenilworth	Paddle steamer	Messrs. Scott & Co.	Greenock	United Kingdom	For private owner.
August	Lord Clyde	Steamship	Messrs. Blackwood & Gordon	Port Glasgow	United Kingdom	For private owner.
August	Mackay	Barque		Shediac	(United Kingdom of Great Britain and Ireland) Colony of New Brunswick	For private owner.
August	Rock Light	Full-rigged ship		Quebec	(United Kingdom of Great Britain and Ireland) Province of Canada	For private owner.
August	Sophia Joachim	Full-rigged ship	W. Pile	Sunderland	United Kingdom	For John Willis & Son.
August	Stormy Petrel	Paddle steamer	Messrs. W. Simons & Co.	Renfrew	United Kingdom	For private owner.
August	Tartar	Paddle steamer	Messrs. Henderson, Coulborn & Co	Glasgow	United Kingdom	For private owner.
August	Vulture	Paddle steamer	Messrs. Aitken & Mansell	Whiteinch	United Kingdom	For private owner.
1 September	Fingal	Paddle steamer	Messrs. Randolph, Elder & Co.	Fairfield	United Kingdom	For private owner.
1 September	Flying Meteor	Tug	Messrs. Blackwood & Gordon	Port Glasgow	United Kingdom	For Clyde Shipping Co.
2 September	Arundel Castle	Clipper	Messrs. Robert Steele & Co.	Greenock	United Kingdom	For Messrs. Donald Currie & Co.
2 September	Glenmark	Merchantman	William Duthie Jr.	Aberdeen	United Kingdom	For Messrs. Richardon, Bros. & Co.
2 September	Osmaniye	Osmaniye-class ironclad	Messrs. Robert Napier & Sons	Govan	United Kingdom	For Ottoman Navy.
3 September	Dharwar	Sailing ship	Harland & Wolff	Belfast	United Kingdom	For Iron Ship Company.
3 September	Nor'wester	Clipper	Messrs. Laurence Hill & Co.	Port Glasgow	United Kingdom	For Messrs. James Jamieson & Co.
3 September	Ontario	Steamship	Messrs. Palmer Bros.	Jarrow	United Kingdom	For National Steam Navigation Company.
3 September	Aveyron	Sarthe-class horse transport	Arsenal de Cherbourg	Cherbourg	France	For French Navy.
5 September	David Mitchell	Pilot boat	John A. Robb	Baltimore, Maryland	United States	For New York Pilots.
6 September	Lucerne	East Indiaman	Messrs. A. Stephen & Sons	Kelvinhaugh	United Kingdom	For George L. Monro.
6 September	Thomas Bazley	Paddle steamer	Messrs. Henderson, Coulborn & Co	Renfrew	United Kingdom	For private owner.
16 September	Betsey	Schooner	Luke Roberts	Conway	United Kingdom	For private owner.
17 September	Franklin	Frigate		Portsmouth Navy Yard	United States	For United States Navy.
17 September	British Prince	Merchantman	Messrs. J. R. Clover & Co.	Woodside	United Kingdom	For British Shipowners Association.
17 September	Intrépide	Algésiras-class ship of the line	Arsenal de Rochefort	Rochefort	France	For French Navy.
17 September	Largs	Paddle steamer	Messrs. Thomas Wingate & Co.	Whiteinch	United Kingdom	For Wemyss Bay Railway Company.
17 September	Le Brethon	Kenney-class gunboat		Ningbo	China	For French Navy.
17 September	Principe Amadeo	Steamship	W. Simons & Co	Renfrew	United Kingdom	For private owner.
17 September	Saint Lawrence	Steamship	T. R. Oswald	Pallion	United Kingdom	For British Colonial Steam Shipping Co. Ltd.
17 September	Uiten	Steamship	James Laing	Deptford	United Kingdom	For Diamond Screw Steam Shipping Company.
20 September	Mofussilite	Merchantman	Messrs. A. Stephen & Sons	Kelvinhaugh	United Kingdom	For Messrs. Finlay, Campbell & Co.
20 September	Thought	Schooner	Messrs. William Bayley & Sons	Ipswich	United Kingdom	For Messrs. Bayley.
29 September	Savoie	Provence-class ironclad		Toulon	France	For French Navy.
30 September	Energy	Barque	Messrs. Robert Arthur Pritchard & Co.	Glandon	United Kingdom	For private owner.
September	Bonny Mary	Brigantine	Philip Bellot	Gorey	(United Kingdom of Great Britain and Ireland) Jersey	For Clement Pallot.
September	India	Barque			(United Kingdom of Great Britain and Ireland) Colony of New Brunswick	For private owner.
September	Jupiter	Steamship	Messrs. William Denny & Bros.	Dumbarton	United Kingdom	For Österreichischer Lloyd.
September	Mindoro	Barque	W. Adamson	Sunderland	United Kingdom	For W. Adamson.
September	Pommerania	Paddle steamer	AG Vulcan	Stettin	Prussia	For private owner.
September	Stromboli	Torpedo boat	Samuel M. Pook	Boston, Massachusetts	United States	For United States Navy.
September	Star Queen	Merchantman	Tyne Iron Ship Building Company	River Tyne	United Kingdom	For private owner.
1 October	Constance & Amelia	Barque	Reay & Naisby	Hylton	United Kingdom	For G. C. Scott.
1 October	La France	Steamship	John Scott	Saint-Nazaire	France	For Compagnie Générale Transatlantique.
3 October	City of Berlin	East Indiaman	Messrs. Charles Connell & Co.	Overnewton	United Kingdom	For Messrs. George Smith & Sons.
4 October	Appolyon	Dredger	Day	New Holland	United Kingdom	For Manchester, Sheffield and Lincolnshire Railway.
5 October	Mangalore	Merchantman	Messrs. Barclay, Curle & Co.	Whiteinch	United Kingdom	For Messrs. Eyre, Evans & Co.
5 October	Moray	Steamship	Messrs. Barclay, Curle & Co.	Stobcross	United Kingdom	For Messrs. John Warrock & Co.
5 October	Secret	Paddle Steamer	Messrs. Bowdler, Chaffer & Co.	Seacombe	United Kingdom	For John Newton Beach.
6 October	Ajax	Steamship	C. & R. Poillon	New York	United States	For private owner.
8 October	Idaho	Sloop-of-war	George Steers	New York	United States	For United States Navy.
13 October	Chattanooga	Frigate	William Cramp & Sons	Philadelphia, Pennsylvania	United States	For United States Navy.
13 October	Lord Clyde	Lord Clyde-class ironclad		Pembroke Dockyard	United Kingdom	For Royal Navy.
13 October	Royal Sovereign	Merchantman	Messrs. Robinson	Cork	United Kingdom	For private owner.
15 October	Douglas Castle	Merchantman	Messrs. Charles Connell & Co.	Overnewton	United Kingdom	For Glasgow and Asiatic Shipping Company.
15 October	James and Agnes	Schooner	William Ashburner	Barrow-in-Furness	United Kingdom	For Thomas Ashburner.
15 October	Kew Kee	Chinatman	Messrs. Holderness & Chilton	Liverpool	United Kingdom	For private owner.
15 October	Kyles	Paddle steamer	Messrs. Caird	Greenock	United Kingdom	For Wemyss Bay Steamboat Co.
15 October	Royal Alfred	Bulwark-class battleship		Portsmouth Dockyard	United Kingdom	For Royal Navy.
17 October	Ancona	Regina Maria Pia-class ironclad	Arman Frères	Bordeaux	France	For Regia Marina.
17 October	Arapiles	Armored frigate	Green	Blackwall Yard	United Kingdom	For Spanish Navy.
17 October	Mary Steuart	Steamship		Leith	United Kingdom	For Messrs. D. R. Macgregor & Co.
17 October	Prince Oscar	Full-rigged ship	Messrs. Pile, Spence & Co.	West Hartlepool	United Kingdom	For S. R. Graves.
18 October	Alexandra	Barque	Humber Ironworks and Shipbuilding Co.	Hull	United Kingdom	For Messrs. J. & T. Harrison.
18 October	Knight of Snowdoun	East Indiaman	Messrs. Steele & Co.	Greenock	United Kingdom	For private owner.
18 October	Liverpool	Steamship	Messrs. A. & J. Inglis	Pointhouse	United Kingdom	For Sligo Steam Navigation Co.
18 October	Newton	Steamship	Messrs. M'Nab & Co.	Greenock	United Kingdom	For Alfred Holt.
18 October	Norfolk	Steamship	Humber Ironworks and Shipbuilding Co.	Hull	United Kingdom	For Messrs. Bailey & Leetham.
18 October	Norseman	Barque	Humber Ironworks and Shipbuilding Co.	Hull	United Kingdom	For Cotesworth & Lyon.
18 October	Peder Skram	Ironclad		Copenhagen	Denmark	For Royal Danish Navy.
19 October	Naubuc	Casco-class monitor	Union Iron Works	Williamsburgh, New York	United States	For United States Navy.
19 October	Umgeni	Clipper	John Smith	Aberdeen	United Kingdom	For John T. Rennie.
20 October	Medusa	Nymphe-class corvette	Königliche Werft	Danzig	Prussia	For Royal Navy.
22 October	Beta	Barque	Messrs. C. Hill & Sons	Bristol	United Kingdom	For Messrs. H. Bath & Sons.
22 October	Dream	Steamship	Messrs. Potter & Co	Liverpool	United Kingdom	For private owner. Collided with, and sunk, the Mersey flat Peel on being launched.
24 October	Libelle	Barque		Bremen	Bremen	For private owner.
27 October	Napoli	Steamship	Messrs. C. Connell & Co.	Overnewton	United Kingdom	For Messrs. Handysides & Henderson.
28 October	Sir Herbert Maddock	Paddle steamer	Messrs. J. Wigham Richardson & Co.	Low Walker	United Kingdom	For Indus Flotilla Company.
28 November	White Squall	Barque	Messrs. Patterson	Bristol	United Kingdom	For Messrs. Garnock, Bibby & Co.
29 October	Pampero	Corvette	Dennis Bros.	River Clyde	United Kingdom	For Confederate States Navy.
29 October	Pinta	Tug	Reaney, Son & Archbold	Chester, Pennsylvania	United States	For United States Navy.
31 October	Travailleur	1st class wheeled aviso	Arsenal de Lorient	Lorient	France	For French Navy
October	Blair Atholl	Barque	J. & R. Bailey	Shoreham-by-Sea	United Kingdom	For Thomas Gates.
October	Bonniton	Barque	T. E. Gingras	Quebec	(United Kingdom of Great Britain and Ireland) Province of Canada	For private owner.
October	Florence Braginton	Barque	W. Richardson	North Hylton	United Kingdom	For Mr. Braginton.
1 November	Aleppo	Ocean liner	Messrs. J. & G. Thomson	Govan	United Kingdom	For British & Foreign Steam Navigation Company.
1 November	Devana	Merchantman	Messrs. Hall	Aberdeen	United Kingdom	For John Jamieson.
1 November	Pilgrim	Tug	Pusey and Jones	Wilmington, Delaware	United States	For United States Navy.
2 November	Isabella Kerr	East Indiaman	Messrs. A. M'Millan & Son	Dumbarton	United Kingdom	For John Kerr.
2 November	Royal George	Full-rigged ship	London Engineering Iron Shipbuilding Company (Limited).	Millwall	United Kingdom	For Messrs. Fernie Bros.
3 November	Copernicus	Merchantman	Messrs. Alexander Stephen & Sons	Kelvinhaugyh	United Kingdom	For private owner.
12 November	Stettin	Steamship	Messrs. Barclay, Curle & Co.	Whiteinch	United Kingdom	For Leith, Hull and Hamburg Steam Packet Company.
14 November	Astracan	East Indiaman	Woodside Graving-dock Company (Limited)	Birkenhead	United Kingdom	For British and Eastern Shipping Company (Limited).
14 November	Camanche	Passaic-class monitor	Donahue, Ryan & Secor, Jersey City, New Jersey	San Francisco, California	United States	Prefabricated at Jersey City, shipped to San Francisco in the Aquila, which sank there. Subsequently salvaged from the wreck of Aquila
14 November	Duke of Rothesay	Merchantman	Messrs. Denny & Rankin	Dumbarton	United Kingdom	For Messrs. Montgomery & Greenlow.
14 November	Mable	Brigantine	Messrs. Hugh Williams & Co.	Portmadoc	United Kingdom	For W. Jones & Co.
15 November	Annie	Schooner	T. Smith	Preston	United Kingdom	For private owner.
15 November	City of Boston	Passenger ship	Messrs. Tod & MacGregor	Partick	United Kingdom	For Inman Line.
15 November	Juno	Steamship	Messrs. William Denny & Bros.	Dumbarton	United Kingdom	For Österreichischer Lloyd.
15 November	Navenby	Barque	Mackern	Preston	United Kingdom	For J. B. Clark.
15 November	Zarco	Steamship	Messrs. Laird Bros.	Birkenhead	United Kingdom	For private owner.
16 November	Mallorca	Steamship	N. Scott Russell	Cardiff	United Kingdom	For Spanish Government.
18 November	Colombian	Steamship	Messrs. M'Nab & Co	Greenock	United Kingdom	For Alfred Holt.
18 November	Lord of the Isles	Merchantman	Messrs. Steele & Co.	Greenock	United Kingdom	For Messrs. Williamson, Milligan & Co.
23 November	Ariel Patterson	Pilot boat	Ariel Patterson	Williamsburgh, New York	United States	For John Canvin Sr., John Canvin Jr., John W. Stanton and Eugene H. Sulivan.
26 November	Napa	Casco-class monitor	Harlan & Hollingsworth	Wilmington, Delaware	United States	For Royal Navy.
30 November	Louisa Wallace	Paddle steamer	Messrs. Aitken & Mansel	Whiteinch	United Kingdom	For private owner.
30 November	St. Andrew	Full-rigged ship	Messrs. Moore & Co	Sunderland	United Kingdom	For Mr. Skinner.
30 November	Warwick	full-rigged ship	Messrs. T. R. Oswald & Co.	Pallion	United Kingdom	For Messrs. Temperley, Darke & Co.
30 November	Unnamed	Barque	John Thompson	Sunderland	United Kingdom	For Messrs. William Nicholson & Sons.
November	Bayo	Steamship	Messrs. A. & J. Inglis	Pointhouse	United Kingdom	For private owner.
November	Colombian	Steamship	Messrs. M'Nab & Co.	Glasgow	United Kingdom	For A. Holt.
November	Douro	Cargo ship	Harland & Wolff	Belfast	United Kingdom	For J. Bibby & Sons.
November	Gyptis	Steamship	Messrs. Caird & Co.	Greenock	United Kingdom	For MM. Fraissenet Père et Fils.
November	Helvetia	Steamship	Messrs. Palmer Bros.	Jarrow	United Kingdom	For National Steam Navigation Co.
November	Ogmore	Barque	John Thompson	Sunderland	United Kingdom	For William Nicholson.
November	Queen of the South	Barque	W. Pile	Sunderland	United Kingdom	For H. Ellis.
November	Spirit of the Storm	Clipper			United Kingdom	For Messrs. Charles Walton & Co.
November	Starbeam	Barque	W. H. Pearson	Sunderland	United Kingdom	For B. Fairley.
November	Tennyson	Brig	O. Sewell	Bath, Maine	United States	For private owner.
November	Voldroque	Steamship	T. B. Seath	Rutherglen	United Kingdom	For private owner.
1 December	Advance	Steamship	Messrs. T. R. Oswald & Co.	Pallion	United Kingdom	For Holmes & Co.
1 December	Coral Nymph	Full-rigged ship	Messrs. Pile, Hay & Co.	Sunderland	United Kingdom	For John Hay.
2 December	Brasil	Coast defence battleship	Forges et Chantiers de la Méditerranée	La Seyne	France	For Brazilian Navy
3 December	Contoocook	Sloop-of-war		Portsmouth Navy Yard	United States	For United States Navy.
3 December	Douro	Passenger ship	Messrs. Caird & Co.	Greenock	United Kingdom	For Royal Mail Steam Packet Company.
13 December	Mahmudiye	Osmaniye-class ironclad	Thames Iron Works	Blackwall	United Kingdom	For Ottoman Navy.
13 December	Indre	Indre-class transport	Arsenal de Lorient	Lorient	France	For French Navy
13 December	Principe Oddini	Troopship	Messrs. W. Simons & Co.	Greenock	United Kingdom	For private owner.
14 December	Andromeda	Merchantman	Jones, Quiggin & Co.	Liverpool	United Kingdom	For private owner.
14 December	Hornet	Paddle steamer	Messrs. Jones, Quiggin & Co.	Liverpool	United Kingdom	For private owner.
14 December	Monocacy	Gunboat	A. & W. Denmead & Son	Baltimore, Maryland	United States	For United States Navy.
14 December	Rangitano	Steamship	J. G. Lawrie	Glasgow	United Kingdom	For private owner.
14 December	Sultan Mahmoud	Frigate	Thames Iron Works, Shipbuilding, Engineering, and Dry Dock Company	Blackwall, London	United Kingdom	For Ottoman Navy.
15 December	Ajax	Tug	Messrs. W. Denny & Bros.	Dumbarton	United Kingdom	For private owner.
15 December	Wampanoag	Frigate		New York Navy Yard	United States	For United States Navy.
17 December	Swan	Paddle steamer	Bowdler, Chaffer & Co.	Seacombe	United Kingdom	For Bowdler, Chaffer & Co.
18 December	Manayunk	Canonicus-class monitor	Snowden & Mason	Pittsburgh, Pennsylvania	United States	For United States Navy.
20 December	Messina	Principe di Carignano-class ironclad	Regio Cantiere di Castellammare di Stabia	Castellammare di Stabia	Italy	For Regia Marina.
22 December	Muscogee	Casemate ironclad	Columbus Navy Yard	Columbus, Georgia	Confederate States of America	For Confederate States Navy.
22 December	Wyandotte	Canonicus-class monitor	Miles Greenwood	Cincinnati, Ohio	United States	For United States Navy.
23 December	Brasil	Ironclad corvette	Société Nouvelle des Forges et Chantiers de la Méditerranée	La Seyne	France	For Imperial Brazilian Navy. PLEASE REFER TALK PAGE
24 December	Trabulus Garb	Steamship	Messrs. Hedderwick & Co.	Govan	United Kingdom	For Ahmed Effendi Gherkim.
27 December	San Remo	Steamship	Messrs. M'Nab & Co.	Greenock	United Kingdom	For private owner.
28 December	Kursetjee Furdonjee	East Indiaman	Messrs. Vernon & Sons	Liverpool	United Kingdom	For Messrs. Thomas Cardwell & Co.
28 December	Glenbirnie	Merchantman	Union Shipbuilding Company	Kelvinhaugh	United Kingdom	For M. J. Wilson.
28 December	Newton	Merchantman	Messrs. A. Stephen & Sons	Kelvinhaugh	United Kingdom	For private owner.
29 December	Abdul Aziz	Ironclad	Messrs. Napier & Sons	Govan	United Kingdom	For Ottoman Navy.
29 December	Hercules	Steamship	Messrs. William Denny & Bros.	Dumbarton	United Kingdom	For private owner.
31 December	Mazeppa	Steamship	J. H. Mackern	Preston	United Kingdom	For M. I. Wilson.
31 December	Roma	Steamship	Messrs. Alexander Stephen & Son	Kelvinhaugh	United Kingdom	For Messrs. Handysides & Henderson.
December	Bella	Paddle steamer	Messrs. T. Wingate & Co.	Whiteinch	United Kingdom	For J. Wilkie.
December	Dom Pedro II	Corvette		La Seyne	France	For Imperial Brazilian Navy.
Spring	Imperator Nikolai	Frigate		Kronstadt	Russia	For Imperial Russian Navy.
Summer	Dr. Gall	Clipper	Messrs. Richardson, Duck & Co.	Stockton-on-Tees	United Kingdom	For Black Ball Line.
Summer	Meteor	Yacht	Hugh Owen	Menai Bridge	United Kingdom	For Mr. Iremonger.
Unknown date	Aboyne	Merchantman	D. A. Douglas	Sunderland	United Kingdom	For Moodie & Co.
Unknown date	Adalia	Steamship	William Doxford	Sunderland	United Kingdom	For Gourley & Co.
Unknown date	Agamemnon	Merchantman	Reay & Naisby	Sunderland	United Kingdom	For Mr. Broomhead.
Unknown date	Albanian	Snow	John Thompson	Sunderland	United Kingdom	For Mr. Nicholson.
Unknown date	Albemarle	Casemate ironclad	Gilbert Elliott	Elizabeth City, North Carolina	Confederate States of America	For Confederate States Navy.
Unknown date	Alfred	Barque	Rawson & Wason	Sunderland	United Kingdom	For H. Smith & Co.
Unknown date	Alice	Brig	Liddle & Sutcliffe	Sunderland	United Kingdom	For Willet & Co.
Unknown date	Alice Dean	Paddle steamer			United States	For Charles A. Dravo, C. Dan Conway and James H. Pepper.
Unknown date	Allahabad	Full-rigged ship	W. H. Potter & Co.	Liverpool	United Kingdom	For Thomas Wall Stephens.
Unknown date	Allen Collier	Sternwheeler		Cincinnati, Ohio	United Kingdom	For private owner.
Unknown date	Alumina	Merchantman	William Doxford	Sunderland	United Kingdom	For Stewart & Co.
Unknown date	America	Tug		Philadelphia, Pennsylvania	United States	For John W. Lynn.
Unknown date	Anemone	Tug		Philadelphia, Pennsylvania	United States	For Messrs. S. & J. M. Flanaghan.
Unknown date	Ann	Merchantman	J. Lister	Sunderland	United Kingdom	For J. Lister.
Unknown date	Annie Maud	Merchantman	J. Lister	Sunderland	United Kingdom	For Davies & Co.
Unknown date	Antrim	Full-rigged ship	William Doxford	Sunderland	United Kingdom	For Moore & Co.
Unknown date	Ariel	Steamship		River Mersey	United Kingdom	For Thomas Higgin.
Unknown date	Argo	Barque	R. Pace	Sunderland	United Kingdom	For Kirkwood & Co.
Unknown date	Astarte	Cutter	Day	Southampton	United Kingdom	For Mr. Heddon.
Unknown date	Augusta	Augusta-class corvette	Arman Frères	Bordeaux	France	For Prussian Navy.
Unknown date	Azalea	Tug	McKay & Andus	Boston, Massachusetts	United States	For private owner.
Unknown date	Bayard	Merchantman	T. Vernon & Son	Liverpool	United Kingdom	For Hall Line.
Unknown date	Beatriz	Merchantman	James Laing	Sunderland	United Kingdom	For J. Laing.
Unknown date	Beaufront	Barque	William Pickersgill	Sunderland	United Kingdom	For J. & H. Scott.
Unknown date	Beautiful Star	Merchantman	J. Barkes	Sunderland	United Kingdom	For J. Barkes.
Unknown date	Bedford	Merchantman	J. Davison	Sunderland	United Kingdom	For W. Atkinson.
Unknown date	Belle	Tug		Philadelphia, Pennsylvania	United States	For private owner.
Unknown date	Bernicia	Merchantman	T. Stonehouse	Sunderland	United Kingdom	For Anderson & Co.
Unknown date	Bertha Marion	Merchantman	G. S. Moore	Sunderland	United Kingdom	For H. Coghill.
Unknown date	Bertrand	Steamboat		Wheeling, West Virginia	United States	For Montana and Idaho Transportation Line.
Unknown date	B. N. Creary	Paddle steamer		Brooklyn, New York	United States	For private owner.
Unknown date	Bona Fide	Snow	Rawson & Watson	Sunderland	United Kingdom	For Gallon Bros.
Unknown date	Borealis	Full-rigged ship	Thomas Bilbe & Co.	Rotherhithe	United Kingdom	For Thomas Bilbe & Co.
Unknown date	Britisher	Schooner	J. & R. Bailey	Shoreham-by-Sea	United Kingdom	For Henry Adams & Co.
Unknown date	Brittany	Paddle steamer	James Ash & Sons	Blackwall	United Kingdom	For London and South Western Railway.
Unknown date	Caldew	Barque	G. & J. Mills	Sunderland	United Kingdom	For Wilson Bros.
Unknown date	Canadian	Merchantman	Peter Austin	Sunderland	United Kingdom	For P. & S. Dove.
Unknown date	Caranjah	Clipper			United Kingdom	For private owner.
Unknown date	Carrizal	Merchantman	T. R. Oswald	Sunderland	United Kingdom	For Shallcross & Co.
Unknown date	Castalia	Merchantman	J. Rodgerson	Sunderland	United Kingdom	For B. & J. Gardner.
Unknown date	Catherine Scott	Merchantman	B. & J. Gardner	Sunderland	United Kingdom	For G. C. Scott.
Unknown date	Cavalier	Merchantman	James Hardie	Sunderland	United Kingdom	For J. Doward & Co.
Unknown date	Celestial Queen	Merchantman	J. Smurthwaite	Sunderland	United Kingdom	For Pile & Co.
Unknown date	Charente	Merchantman	G. Bartram	Sunderland	United Kingdom	For Reed & Co.
Unknown date	Charles Whiteway	Schooner	Brundrit & Whiteway	Runcorn	United Kingdom	For Charles Hazlehurst.
Unknown date	Chauncey Vibbard	Paddle steamer	Lawrence & Foulks	New York	United States	For Alfred Van Santvoord.
Unknown date	Christiana	Tug	Bishop, Son & Co.	Philadelphia, Pennsylvania	United States	For private owner.
Unknown date	Clara	Snow	George Barker	Monkwearmouth	United Kingdom	For Moses & Co.
Unknown date	Clarovine	Merchantman	L. Wheatley	Sunderland	United Kingdom	For D. Jones.
Unknown date	Cognac	Snow	J. & J. Gibbon	Sunderland	United Kingdom	For Bassett & Co.
Unknown date	Colossus	Sternwheeler		Freedom, Pennsylvania	United States	For private owner.
Unknown date	Columbia	Steamship		Philadelphia, Pennsylvania	United States	For private owner.
Unknown date	Commodore Perry	Steamship		Buffalo, New York	United States	For United States Revenue Cutter Service.
Unknown date	Conqueror	Tug		Brooklyn, New York	United States	For private owner.
Unknown date	Constantia	Merchantman	John T. Alcock	Sunderland	United Kingdom	For Parker & Co.
Unknown date	Corrientes	Merchantman	T. R. Oswald	Sunderland	United Kingdom	For Mr. Shalcross.
Unknown date	Cyrus Walker	Paddle steamer	Domingo Marcucci	San Francisco, California	United Kingdom	For Pope & Talbot.
Unknown date	Dalmatia	Steamship	Messrs. Denton, Gray & Co.	Newcastle upon Tyne	United Kingdom	For private owner.
Unknown date	Defence	Brigantine	A. Simey	Sunderland	United Kingdom	For W. Tate.
Unknown date	Dessouk	Steamship	Denton, Gray & Company	West Hartlepool	United Kingdom	For Isma'il Pasha of Egypt.
Unknown date	Devon	Barque	George Barker	Sunderland	United Kingdom	For George H. Loveridge.
Unknown date	Devonshire	Merchantman	L. Wheatley	Sunderland	United Kingdom	For S. B. Davy.
Unknown date	Dilkhoosh	Clipper			United Kingdom	For private owner.
Unknown date	Dunbar Castle	Merchantman	James Laing	Sunderland	United Kingdom	For Savory & Co.
Unknown date	Durham	full-rigged ship	George Marshall	Sunderland	United Kingdom	For G. Marshall.
Unknown date	Eastern Province	Merchantman	James Laing	Sunderland	United Kingdom	For Mr. Diamond.
Unknown date	Eastern Queen	Barque	Robert Thompson Jr.	Sunderland	United Kingdom	For Milburn & Co.
Unknown date	Edith	Steamship	Messrs. Hendrickson & Co.	Renfrew	United Kingdom	For private owner.
Unknown date	Edith Marion	Merchantman	Robert Thompson & Sons	Sunderland	United Kingdom	For G. Jones.
Unknown date	Edward Cardwell	Full-rigged ship		Miramichi	(United Kingdom of Great Britain and Ireland) Colony of New Brunswick	For private owner.
Unknown date	Edward P. Bouverie	Clipper	Messrs. Alexander Hall & Co.	Aberdeen	United Kingdom	For Patrick Henderson & Co.
Unknown date	Eglantine	Barque	T. Stonehouse	Sunderland	United Kingdom	For J. Donkin.
Unknown date	Ella	Barque	Messrs. M. Pearse & Co.	Stockton-on-Tees	United Kingdom	For private owner.
Unknown date	Emerald	Barque	W. Richardson	Sunderland	United Kingdom	For Mr. Weatherley.
Unknown date	Emily McLaren	Merchantman	J. & J. Gibbon	Sunderland	United Kingdom	For private owner.
Unknown date	Ethelwin	Barque	G. Short	Sunderland	United Kingdom	For Walton & Co.
Unknown date	Eolus	Paddle steamer		Newburgh, New York	United States	For private owner.
Unknown date	European	Brig	George Barker	Sunderland	United Kingdom	For P. & J. Dove.
Unknown date	Eveline	Merchantman	J. & J. Gibbon	Sunderland	United Kingdom	For T. & J. Reay.
Unknown date	Falcon	Merchantman	J. Robinson	Sunderland	United Kingdom	For G. & J. Robinson.
Unknown date	Fi Wan	Merchantman	G. Peverall	Sunderland	United Kingdom	For J. Patton.
Unknown date	Flossie	Merchantman	J. Davison	Sunderland	United Kingdom	For Anderson & Co.
Unknown date	France	Paddle steamer	James Ash & Sons	Blackwall	United Kingdom	For London, Chatham and Dover Railway.
Unknown date	Fugitive	Barque	G. Gardner	Sunderland	United Kingdom	For T. B. Walker & Co.
Unknown date	Fujiyama	Frigate		New York	United States	For Tokugawa Shogunate Navy.
Unknown date	F. W. Lincoln	Paddle steamer		Boston, Massachusetts	United States	For McKay & Aldus.
Unknown date	General Grant	Barque		Maine	United States	For Messrs. Boyes, Richardson & Co.
Unknown date	General Lee	Merchantman	James Laing	Sunderland	United Kingdom	For Palgrave & Co.
Unknown date	Geraldine	Barque	R. Pace	Sunderland	United Kingdom	For Richard Sheraton.
Unknown date	General Sherman	Gunboat		Chattanooga, Tennessee	United States	For U.S. War Department.
Unknown date	General Thomas	Gunboat		Chattanooga, Tennessee	United States	For U.S. War Department.
Unknown date	Glen Afton	Merchantman	John Blumer	Sunderland	United Kingdom	For J. Dickson.
Unknown date	Glenrosa	Merchantman	James Robinson	Sunderland	United Kingdom	For Mr. Templeton.
Unknown date	Great Emperor	Tug		Newcastle upon Tyne	United Kingdom	For Messrs. Joliffe Bros.
Unknown date	Hannah	Schooner	Wilson & Son, or Wilson Bros.	Sunderland	United Kingdom	For R. Christie.
Unknown date	Harvest	Barque	Robert Pace	Sunderland	United Kingdom	For Mr. Thompson.
Unknown date	Harwich	Paddle steamer	Messrs. Simpson & Co.	London	United Kingdom	For Great Eastern Railway.
Unknown date	Heather Bell	Barque	J. Errington	Sunderland	United Kingdom	For T. White.
Unknown date	Henry Grenfell	Barque	G. Gardner	Sunderland	United Kingdom	For John Hay.
Unknown date	Henrys	Merchantman	B. Hodgson	Sunderland	United Kingdom	For Mr. Longstaff.
Unknown date	Herald of Light	Merchantman	G. Gardner	Sunderland	United Kingdom	For private owner.
Unknown date	Hibiscus	Steamship			United States	For S. M. Pook.
Unknown date	Home	Merchantman	W. Ratcliffe	Sunderland	United Kingdom	For Mr. Ratcliffe.
Unknown date	Hubert	Barque	John Thompson	Sunderland	United Kingdom	For Gayner & Co.
Unknown date	Ictíneo II	Submarine	La Navegacíon Submarina		Spain	For Narciso Monturiol.
Unknown date	Idler	Schooner	Samuel Hartt Pook	Fairhaven, Connecticut	United States	For United States Navy.
Unknown date	Industry	Brig	S. Metcalf	Southwick	United Kingdom	For A. Law.
Unknown date	Iowa	Steamship		Waterford	United Kingdom	For General Steam Navigation Company.
Unknown date	Ipswich	Paddle steamer	James Ash	Cubitt Town	United Kingdom	For Great Eastern Railway.
Unknown date	Isabel	Merchantman	G. & J. Mills	Sunderland	United Kingdom	For private owner.
Unknown date	Isabella	Merchantman	G. Bartram	Sunderland	United Kingdom	For W. Middleton.
Unknown date	James McMartin	Tug		Albany, New York	United States	For private owner.
Unknown date	Jane Brown	Merchantman	Gibbon & Nichol	Sunderland	United Kingdom	For T. Richards.
Unknown date	J. M. Joshua	Barque	John Smurthwaite	Sunderland	United Kingdom	For Joshua Bros.
Unknown date	Joshua	Schooner	Atkinson & Thompson	Knottingley	United Kingdom	For Kilner & Co.
Unknown date	Juno	Schooner	Joseph & Nicholas Butson	Bodinnick or Polruan	United Kingdom	For William Luke.
Unknown date	Kaffraria	Merchantman	James Laing	Sunderland	United Kingdom	For Diamond Steam Navigation Co.
Unknown date	Kate B. Porter	Steamship		Belle Vernon, Pennsylvania	United States	For J. B. Porter & Son.
Unknown date	Kate Kellock	Full-rigged ship	John Haswell	Sunderland	United Kingdom	For Kellock & Co.
Unknown date	Kinlin	Steamship	Seath	Rutherglen	United Kingdom	For private owner.
Unknown date	Knowsley	Barque	T. R. Oswald	Sunderland	United Kingdom	For Shallcross & Co.
Unknown date	Leichardt	Steamship	Australian Steam Navigation Company	Pyrmont	(United Kingdom of Great Britain and Ireland) New South Wales	For Australian Steam Navigation Company.
Unknown date	Lily	Merchantman	Sykes & Co.	Sunderland	United Kingdom	For Potts & Co.
Unknown date	Lincoln	Full-rigged ship	T. R. Oswald	Sunderland	United Kingdom	For Temperley & Co.
Unknown date	Lion	Tug		Philadelphia, Pennsylvania	United States	For private owner.
Unknown date	Lizzie Waters	Merchantman	Gray & Younb	Sunderland	United Kingdom	For A. M'Donald.
Unknown date	Lydia Hylton	Merchantman	William Pickersgill	Sunderland	United Kingdom	For Vickers & Co.
Unknown date	Maid Marion	Barque	Gibbon & Nichol	Sunderland	United Kingdom	For R. Bamfield.
Unknown date	Maid of Aln	Merchantman	J. & J. Gibbon	Sunderland	United Kingdom	For private owner.
Unknown date	Mary	Merchantman	D. A. Douglas	Sunderland	United Kingdom	For Mr. Doxford.
Unknown date	Mary Barrett	Schooner	Joseph & Nicholas Butson	Bodinnick or Polruan	United Kingdom	For private owner.
Unknown date	Mary Lawson	Barque	James Hardie	Sunderland	United Kingdom	For Mr. Hodgson.
Unknown date	Mayflower	Tug		Philadelphia, Pennsylvania	United States	For private owner.
Unknown date	May Flower	Merchantman	J. Robinson	Sunderland	United Kingdom	For Mr. Jackson.
Unknown date	Medari Tefyk	Merchantman	T. R. Oswald	Sunderland	United Kingdom	For private owner.
Unknown date	Metamora	Tug	Peck & Masters	Cleveland, Ohio	United States	For private owner.
Unknown date	Mist	Sternwheeler		Allegheny, Pennsylvania	United States	For private owner.
Unknown date	Moccasin	Steamship		Philadelphia Navy Yard	United States	For United States Navy.
Unknown date	Mula	Merchantman	W. Pile	Sunderland	United Kingdom	For Reynolds, Mann & Co.
Unknown date	Muscoota	Mohongo-class gunboat		Greenpoint, New York	United States	For United States Navy.
Unknown date	Nearchus	Barque	J. Haswell	Sunderland	United Kingdom	For Ayre & Co.
Unknown date	Neva	Merchantman	B. Hodgson	Sunderland	United Kingdom	For Mr. Humble.
Unknown date	Nina Tilden	Sternwheeler	Alphonso F. Tilden		United States	For Alphonso F. Tilden.
Unknown date	Norham	Barque	G. & J. Mills	Sunderland	United Kingdom	For J. Henderson.
Unknown date	Onega	Merchantman	James Laing	Sunderland	United Kingdom	For Mr. Norwood.
Unknown date	Onyx	Barque	James Laing	Sunderland	United Kingdom	For Wheatley & Co.
Unknown date	Oriental Queen	Merchantman	G. Peverall	Sunderland	United Kingdom	For Adamson & Co.
Unknown date	Ortive	Merchantman	T. Stonehouse	Sunderland	United Kingdom	For Bell & Co.
Unknown date	Osman Ghazy	Ironclad	Messrs. Napier	Glasgow	United Kingdom	For Ottoman Navy.
Unknown date	Otter	Merchantman	T. R. Oswald	Sunderland	United Kingdom	For E. Preston.
Unknown date	Pactolus	Barque	J. Gill	Sunderland	United Kingdom	For Potts & Sons.
Unknown date	Palawan	Full-rigged ship	W. Adamson	Sunderland	United Kingdom	For W. Adamson.
Unknown date	Pioneer	Merchantman	Rutter & Cummings	Sunderland	United Kingdom	For Ovenden & Co.
Unknown date	Premchund Roychund	Merchantman		River Mersry	United Kingdom	For Bombay Shipping Company.
Unknown date	Primrose	Snow	John Denniston	Sunderland	United Kingdom	For Stephen W. Rackley & Co.
Unknown date	Prince Imperial	Paddle steamer	James Ash & Sons	Blackwall	United Kingdom	For London, Chatham and Dover Railway.
Unknown date	Principessa Clotilde	Corvette			Italy	For Regia Marina.
Unknown date	Progress	Merchantman	Gray & Young	Sunderland	United Kingdom	For Spain & Co.
Unknown date	Promise	Schooner	John Barter	Brixham	United Kingdom	For Varwell & Co.
Unknown date	Puelchi	Merchantman	James Hardie	Sunderland	United Kingdom	For E. Brown.
Unknown date	Queen of the Bay	Merchantman	James Hardie	Sunderland	United Kingdom	For Ellis & Co.
Unknown date	Queen of the East	Full-rigged ship	W. Pile	Sunderland	United Kingdom	For H. Ellis.
Unknown date	Raleigh	Casemate ironclad	Cassidey	Wilmington, North Carolina	Confederate States of America	For Confederate States Navy.
Unknown date	Ranger	Barque	W. Barkley	Sunderland	United Kingdom	For Mr. Gordon.
Unknown date	Raven	Merchantman	J. Robinson	Sunderland	United Kingdom	For Potts Bros.
Unknown date	Ringdove	Merchantman	G. & J. Mills	Sunderland	United Kingdom	For Mr. Robinson.
Unknown date	River Queen	Paddle steamer	Benjamin C. Terry	Keyport, New Jersey	United States	For Alfred Van Santvoord.
Unknown date	Robert & Charlotte	Merchantman	G. Short	Sunderland	United Kingdom	For R. Curry.
Unknown date	Rondinella	Merchantman	W. Nicholson	Sunderland	United Kingdom	For Mr. Nicholson.
Unknown date	Rose	Snow	Edward Potts	Seaham	United Kingdom	For W. Kish.
Unknown date	Rosette	Steamship	Messrs. Pile & Co	Middleton	United Kingdom	For private owner.
Unknown date	Royal Edward	Clipper		River Thames	United Kingdom	For Red Cross Line.
Unknown date	Rushing Water	Barque	James Robinson	Sunderland	United Kingdom	For C. Newman.
Unknown date	Saint Leonards	Full-rigged ship	Pile, Hay & Co	Sunderland	United Kingdom	For Bonus & Sons.
Unknown date	Saleta	Barque	A. Simey	Sunderland	United Kingdom	For Mr. Olivarria.
Unknown date	Sarah Ann	Barque	T. Robson	Sunderland	United Kingdom	For Proudfoot & Co.
Unknown date	Sarah Watson	Barque	J. H. Watson	Sunderland	United Kingdom	For G. Watson.
Unknown date	Sarepta	Snow	Gray & Young	Sunderland	United Kingdom	For Mr. Richardson.
Unknown date	Sea King	Paddle steamer	James Ash & Sons	Blackwall	United Kingdom	For Charles C. Nelson.
Unknown date	Shakespeare	Barque	G. Peverall	Sunderland	United Kingdom	For J. Hibbert.
Unknown date	Sheref Ressair	Merchantman	T. R. Oswald	Sunderland	United Kingdom	For private owner.
Unknown date	Spirea	Steamship		Fair Haven, Connecticut	United States	For private owner.
Unknown date	Stour	Paddle steamer	James Ash	Cubitt Town	United Kingdom	For Great Eastern Railway.
Unknown date	Stranger	Barque	R. H. Potts & Bros.	Sunderland	United Kingdom	For Potts Bros.
Unknown date	Strelna	Merchantman	James Laing	Sunderland	United Kingdom	For Norwood & Co.
Unknown date	Sugar Stick	Merchantman		Baltimore, Maryland	United States	For private owner.
Unknown date	Sunshine	Brig	Sykes & Co	Sunderland	United Kingdom	For Rowell & co.
Unknown date	Superb	Merchantman	Robert Thompson & Sons	Sunderland	United Kingdom	For Cropton & Co.
Unknown date	Tasso	Steamship	T. R. Oswald	Sunderland	United Kingdom	For Swainston & Co.
Unknown date	Thalia	Brig	John T. Alcock	Sunderland	United Kingdom	For T. Adamson.
Unknown date	Thames	Steamship	Messrs. T. R. Oswald & Co.	Pallion	United Kingdom	For Temperley & Co.
Unknown date	Thurso	Merchantman	W. Pile	Sunderland	United Kingdom	For Mr. Adamson.
Unknown date	Tinnevelly	Merchantman	W. Naizby	Sunderland	United Kingdom	For W. Neimann.
Unknown date	Tirzah	Merchantman	Mr. Desmond	Miramichi	(United Kingdom of Great Britain and Ireland) Colony of New Brunswick	For private owner.
Unknown date	Traveler	Sternwheeler		Middletown, Pennsylvania	United States	For private owner.
Unknown date	Trefoil	Steamship	Donald McKay	East Boston, Massachusetts	United States	For private owner.
Unknown date	Tristram Shandy	Paddle steamer		Greenock	United Kingdom	For Matthew Isaac Wilson.
Unknown date	Ulleswater	Barque	W. Robinson	Deptford	United Kingdom	For T. Nicholson.
Unknown date	Umgeni	Clipper	John Smith	Aberdeen	United Kingdom	For Rennie Line.
Unknown date	United States	Steamship	S. Gildersleeve & Son	Portland, Connecticut	United States	For Wakemann, Dimon & Co., and S. Gildersleeve & Sons.
Unknown date	Valdano	Barque	B. & J. Gardner	Sunderland	United Kingdom	For D. Johnson.
Unknown date	Victoria	Augusta-class corvette	Arman Frères	Bordeaux	France	For Prussian Navy.
Unknown date	Village Belle	Merchantman	Liddle & Sutcliffe	Sunderland	United Kingdom	For Colling & Co.
Unknown date	Voluna	Merchantman	James Hardie	Sunderland	United Kingdom	For J. Dickson.
Unknown date	Wabask	Collier		Philadelphia, Pennsylvania	United States	For Messrs. S. & J. M Flanaghan.
Unknown date	Walker Hall	Merchantman	J. Davison	Sunderland	United Kingdom	For T. Anderson.
Unknown date	Walrus	Merchantman	A. Simey	Sunderland	United Kingdom	For private owner.
Unknown date	War Cloud	Barque	J. H. Watson	Sunderland	United Kingdom	For G. Watson.
Unknown date	Washoe	Steamboat			United States	For private owner.
Unknown date	Waverley	Paddle steamer	Messrs. C. Mitchell & Co.	Low Walker	United Kingdom	For private owner.
Unknown date	Whisper	Barque	W. Chilton	Sunderland	United Kingdom	For Mr. Cumming.
Unknown date	William Naizby	Barque	W. Naizby	Sunderland	United Kingdom	For W. Naizby.
Unknown date	Willie Gamage	Paddle steamer		Cincinnati, Ohio	United States	For private owner.
Unknown date	Yucca	Steamship	Donald McKay	East Boston, Massachusetts	United States	For private owner.
Unknown date	Zoroya	Barque	W. Briggs	Sunderland	United Kingdom	For Mr. Glynn.
