= Transvaal (1874 ship) =

The Transvaal was a wooden barque cargo ship of the Rennie line. In December 1874 on her maiden voyage from London she dragged anchor and was driven ashore south of the Umgeni River in South Africa, causing 12 deaths.
