= Waldensian (ship) =

The Waldensian was a steamship of the Rennie line that was lost on 13 October 1862, after it ran aground on rocks at Struis Point near Cape Agulhas en route from Durban to Cape Town. The passengers included eight predikants of the Dutch Reformed Church, one of them, the reverend Frans L. Cachet, later writing that it was said on leaving Durban that the ship would not arrive safely, as "one minister aboard a ship is bad enough, but with eight on board, things could not possibly go well." There was no loss of life.
