= USS Spirea =

Steam ship acquired by the US Union Navy

History

United States
- Laid down: date unknown
- Launched: in 1864 at Fair Haven, Connecticut
- Acquired: 30 December 1864; in New York City, New York
- Commissioned: 9 January 1865
- Decommissioned: 23 August 1865; at the New York Navy Yard
- Stricken: 1866 (est.)
- Fate: Sold, 5 October 1866

General characteristics
- Displacement: 409 tons
- Length: not known
- Beam: not known
- Draught: not known
- Propulsion: steam engine; screw-propelled
- Speed: not known
- Complement: 65
- Armament: two 30-pounder Parrott rifles; four 24-pounder howitzers

USS Spirea was a 409-ton steamer acquired by the Union Navy towards the end of the American Civil War.

The Union Navy placed Spirea, with a crew of 65 sailors and naval officers, in service as a gunship and assigned her to blockade operations against the Confederate States of America, placing her as a gunboat on the Gulf of Mexico coast of Florida where she spent her entire U.S. Navy career.

== Built in Fair Haven, Connecticut, in 1864 ==
Spirea—a twin-screw steamer built in 1864 at Fair Haven, Connecticut, and sister ship of USS Hibiscus (1864)—was purchased by the Union Navy at New York City on 30 December 1864 from S. M. Pook; and was commissioned on 9 January 1865, Acting Volunteer Lieutenant George E. Nelson in command.

== Civil War operations ==
Spirea was ordered to join the East Gulf Blockading Squadron at Key West, Florida, in early January 1865. On 23 February, she led an expedition up the St. Marks River to land Union Army troops for an attack on Tallahassee, Florida.

Spirea and two other ships ran aground, but she was refloated and patrolled off St. Marks, Florida, until 1 May when she joined the blockade off Apalachicola, Florida. Two weeks later, she returned to St. Marks.

== Post-war deactivation ==
After the end of the Civil War, Spirea remained on duty in the Gulf of Mexico until she sailed early in August. Spirea was decommissioned at the New York Navy Yard on 23 August 1865 and was sold at public auction at New York City on 5 October 1866.

== Subsequent maritime career ==
The screw steamer was documented as Sappho on 30 January 1867 for operation out of New York City. She was apparently lost later in 1867, but details of her demise have not been found.
