= USS Gamage (1864) =

Large steamer

History

United States
- Ordered: as Willie Gamage
- Laid down: date unknown
- Launched: 1864
- Acquired: 22 December 1864
- Commissioned: 23 March 1865
- Decommissioned: 29 July 1865
- Stricken: 1865 (est.)
- Fate: Sold, 17 August 1865

General characteristics
- Displacement: 187 tons
- Length: 148 ft 6 in (45.26 m)
- Beam: 30 ft 3 in (9.22 m)
- Draught: depth of hold 4 ft 6 in (1.37 m)
- Propulsion: steam engine; side wheel-propelled
- Speed: not known
- Complement: not known
- Armament: two 20-pounder guns; one 12-pounder gun

USS Gamage was a large steamer acquired by the Union Navy during the last months of the American Civil War. She was used as a gunboat to collect naval assets of the defeated Confederacy.

== Commissioned as a gunboat in 1865 ==
Gamage was built as merchant steamer Willie Gamage in 1864 at Cincinnati, Ohio; purchased there 22 December 1864; and converted into a gunboat by Joseph Brown of Cincinnati. She was commissioned at Mound City, Illinois, 23 March 1865, Acting Master William Neil in command.

== In search of Confederate president Jefferson Davis ==
Assigned to the 5th Division of the Mississippi Squadron, Gamage departed Mound City 30 March 1865 and arrived Natchez, Mississippi, 2 April where she remained alert to intercept Confederate president Jefferson Davis, his cabinet and other Confederate leaders should they attempt to cross the Mississippi River.

The President of the Confederacy and members of his staff were captured 10 May at Irwinville, Georgia.

== Taking possession of Confederate Navy assets ==
On 1 June Gamage entered the mouth of Red River to form with a joint expedition up that river to receive surrendered Confederate ships and men.

The Union naval force of eight steamers under command of Lt. Comdr. W. E. Fitzhugh was accompanied by Army steamer Ida May, carrying Major General F. J. Herron and his staff. Arriving Alexandria, Louisiana, 2 June, Commander Fitzhugh took possession of Confederate ironclad Missouri and proceeded up river to Shreveport, Louisiana, in Gamage.

There he seized the steamer Cotton and supplies at the Navy storehouse and on the 8th departed for the mouth of the river. At the request of General Herron, Gamage remained at Alexandria, Louisiana, to assist the Army as needed until 27 June when she departed for Natchez, Mississippi, arriving 7 July.

== Post-war decommissioning, sale, and subsequent career ==
Gamage reached Mound City, Illinois, from Natchez 22 July. She decommissioned on the 29th and was sold at public auction 17 August 1865 to J. R. Griffith for $11,000. She was redocumented as merchant steamer Southern Belle 4 October 1865 and burned 11 October 1876 at Plaquemine, Louisiana.
