= French ironclad Savoie =

Provence-class armored frigates

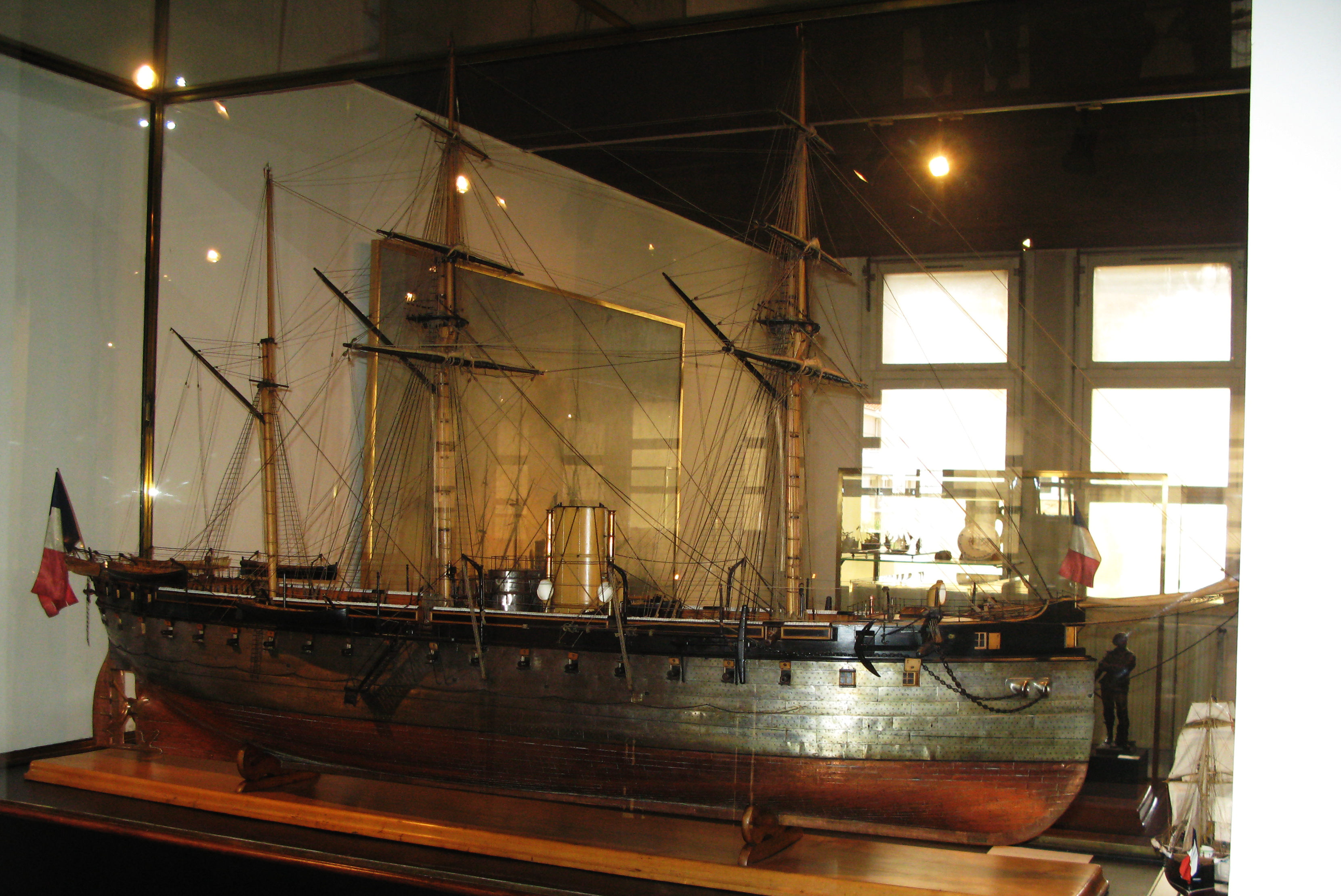
- A scale model of sister ship Flandre

History

France
- Name: Savoie
- Namesake: Savoie
- Ordered: 16 November 1860
- Builder: Arsenal de Toulon
- Laid down: March 1861
- Launched: 29 September 1864
- Completed: April 1865
- Commissioned: 25 March 1865
- Stricken: 19 November 1888
- Fate: Scrapped, 1889

General characteristics
- Class & type: Provence-class ironclad frigate
- Displacement: 5,810 t (5,720 long tons)
- Length: 82.9 m (272 ft) (o/a)
- Beam: 17.06 m (56 ft)
- Draft: 8.4 m (27 ft 7 in) (deep load)
- Installed power: 8 boilers; 3,200 PS (2,400 kW)
- Propulsion: 1 shaft, 1 compound-expansion steam engine
- Sail plan: Barque-rig
- Speed: 14.5 knots (26.9 km/h; 16.7 mph)
- Range: 2,410 nautical miles (4,460 km; 2,770 mi) at 10 knots (19 km/h; 12 mph)
- Complement: 579–594
- Armament: 4 × 240 mm (9.4 in) rifled muzzle-loading (RML) guns; 7 × 194 mm (7.6 in) smoothbore guns; 6 × 164.7 mm (6.5 in) RML guns
- Armor: Belt: 150 mm (5.9 in); Battery: 110 mm (4.3 in); Conning tower: 100 mm (3.9 in)

The French ironclad Savoie was one of 10 Provence-class armored frigates built for the French Navy (Marine Nationale) during the 1860s. Commissioned in 1865, she was initially assigned to the Northern Squadron (Escadre du Nord), often serving as a flagship. The ironclad played a minor role in the Franco-Prussian War of 1870–1871, blockading the North Sea coast of Prussia. Savoie was reduced to reserve after the war, but was reactivated in 1872 and assigned to the Mediterranean Squadron (Escadre de la Méditerranée). The ship was decommissioned in 1879 and was used for testing in 1883. Savoie was stricken in 1888 and was scrapped the following year.

== Design and description ==
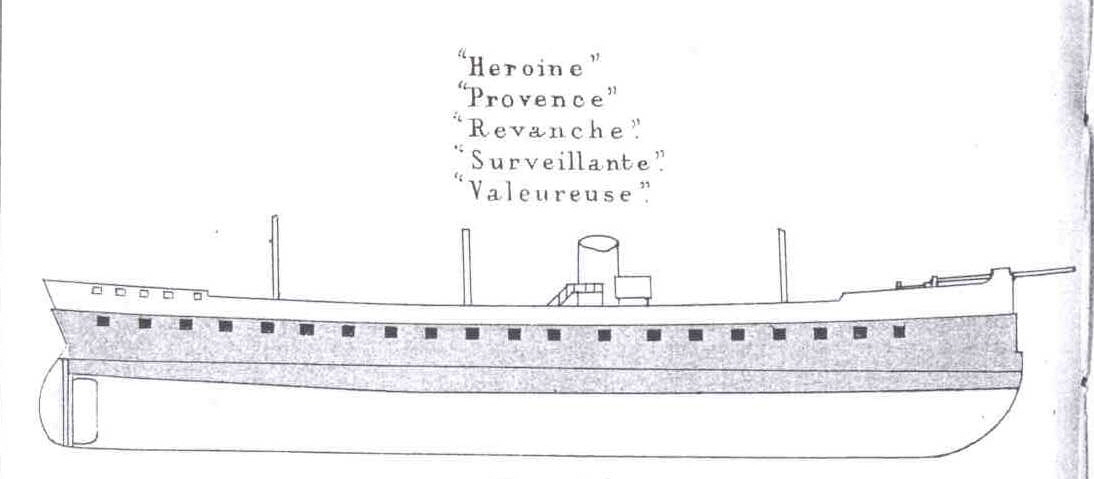
Right elevation line drawing of the class; the shaded area shows the armor protection

The Provence class was designed as an enlarged version of the Gloire-class ironclads with thicker armor, more powerful guns, and better seakeeping qualities. The ships had an overall length of 82.9 meters (272 ft), a beam of 17.06 meters (56 ft), and a draft of 8.4 meters (27 ft 7 in) at deep load. They displaced 5,810 metric tons (5,720 long tons). Their crew numbered 579–594 officers and enlisted men.

When the French discovered that the British ironclad Warrior had reached 14.3 knots (26.5 km/h; 16.5 mph) during her sea trials, they decided to add an extra cylinder to the engine of the five ships still under construction in an attempt to achieve 14.5 knots (26.9 km/h; 16.7 mph). In Savoie and her sister ships Valeureuse and Magnanime, the middle cylinder received the steam provided by eight boilers first which then expanded into the two outer cylinders, making the engine an early form of a compound-expansion steam engine. The engine drove the single propeller shaft and was rated at 1,000 nominal horsepower or 3,200 metric horsepower (2,400 kW). The Provence class carried enough coal to allow them to steam for 2,410 nautical miles (4,460 km; 2,770 mi) at a speed of 10 knots (19 km/h; 12 mph). They were fitted with a three-masted barque rig that had a sail area of 1,960 square meters (21,100 sq ft).

=== Armament and protection ===
The main battery of the Provence-class ships was intended to be thirty 164.7-millimeter (6.5 in) Modèle 1858–60 rifled muzzle-loading (RML) guns, but this was changed to a mixed armament of four 240-millimeter (9.4 in) Modèle 1864 RMLs and six 194-millimeter (7.6 in) Modèle 1864 smoothbore muzzle-loading guns on the gundeck. Positioned on the quarterdeck and the forecastle were another 194 mm smoothbore and six 164.7 mm Modèle 1858 RMLs, at least some of which served as chase guns. By 1869–1870, Savoie's armament consisted of eight 240 mm Modèle 1864 RMLs on the gundeck and four 194 mm Modèle 1864 smoothbores as chase guns on the quarterdeck and forecastle.

From the upper deck down to below the waterline, the sides of the ships were completely armored with 150 mm (5.9 in) of wrought iron, backed by 750 mm (29.5 in) of wood. The sides of the battery itself were protected with 110 mm (4.3 in) of armor that was backed by 610 mm (24 in) of wood. The conning tower's sides consisted of 100-millimeter (3.9 in) armor plates.

== Construction and service ==
Savoie, named after the historic province, was ordered on 16 November 1860 from the Arsenal de Toulon, laid down in March 1861 and launched on 29 September 1864. The ship was commissioned (armement définitif) on 25 March 1865. She was assigned to the Ironclad Division (division cuirassée) of the Northern Squadron, based in Cherbourg and became the flagship of Rear Admiral (contre-amiral) Charles de Dompierre d'Hornoy on 22 July 1867. He was relieved by Rear Admiral Alexandre Dieudonné on 16 September 1869 and Savoie was later reduced to reserve.

When the Franco-Prussian War began on 19 July 1870, Savoie was still in reserve and she became the flagship of Rear Admiral Jérôme-Hyacinthe Penhoat. The ship was assigned to Vice Admiral Léon Martin Fourichon's squadron that was tasked to blockade German ports in the Heligoland Bight. It departed Brest on 8 August and arrived off the British-owned island of Heligoland three days later. The neutral British denied the French permission to re-coal there and the ships were forced to perform it at sea under dangerous conditions. Bad weather and a series of storms beginning in late August prevented the squadron from coaling and the ships were forced to return to France in early September. By then the Prussians were besieging Paris and many of the trained gunners aboard the squadron's ships were transferred to defend the city. The squadron resumed the blockade with reduced crews until December when smaller ships took it over.

Savoie was paid off in 1871 at Toulon, but she was recommissioned on 1 January 1872 as the flagship of Rear Admiral de Chaillé. He was relieved by Rear Admiral Charles Jules de Surville on 5 October. The ship was reduced to reserve at Toulon in 1874–1876. She was reactivated on 15 April 1876 and was commanded by Captain (Capitaine de Vaisseau) Théophile Aube, the future French Minister of Marine, in 1878. Savoie returned to reserve the following year, initially at Brest and then at Lorient. In 1883 she was assigned to the Experimental Division (division d'essais) at Cherbourg. The ship was stricken from the navy list on 19 November 1888 and was broken up the following year.

== Bibliography ==
- de Balincourt, Captain & Vincent-Bréchignac, Captain (1975). "The French Navy of Yesterday: Ironclad Frigates: Second Group – Provence Type". F.P.D.S. Newsletter. III (2): 9–13. OCLC 41554533.
- Campbell, N. J. M. (1979). "France". In Chesneau, Roger & Kolesnik, Eugene M. (eds.). Conway's All the World's Fighting Ships 1860–1905. Greenwich, UK: Conway Maritime Press. pp. 282–333. ISBN 0-8317-0302-4.
- Gille, Eric (1999). Cent ans de cuirassés français [A Century of French Battleships] (in French). Nantes: Marines. ISBN 2-909-675-50-5.
- Roberts, Stephen S. (2021). French Warships in the Age of Steam 1859–1914: Design, Construction, Careers and Fates. Barnsley, UK: Seaforth Publishing. ISBN 978-1-5267-4533-0.
- Roche, Jean-Michel (2005). Dictionnaire des bâtiments de la flotte de guerre française de Colbert à nos jours [Dictionary of French Warships from Colbert to Today] (in French). Vol. Tome I: 1671–1870. Toulon: Group Retozel-Maury Millau. ISBN 978-2-9525917-0-6. OCLC 165892922.
- Silverstone, Paul H. (1984). Directory of the World's Capital Ships. New York: Hippocrene Books. ISBN 0-88254-979-0.
- Wilson, H. W. (1896). Ironclads in Action: A Sketch of Naval Warfare From 1855 to 1895, with Some Account of the Development of the Battleship in England. Vol. 1. Boston: Little, Brown. OCLC 902936108.
- Winfield, Rif & Roberts, Stephen S. (2015). French Warships in the Age of Sail, 1786–1861. Barnsley, UK: Seaforth Publishing. ISBN 978-1-84832-204-2.
