= USS Trefoil (1865) =

Gunboat of the United States Navy

History

United States
- Launched: 1864
- Acquired: 4 February 1865
- Commissioned: 1 March 1865
- Decommissioned: 30 August 1865
- Fate: Sold, 28 May 1867

General characteristics
- Displacement: 370 tons
- Length: 145 ft 7 in (44.37 m)
- Beam: 23 ft 9 in (7.24 m)
- Draft: 11 ft 2 in (3.40 m)
- Propulsion: steam engine; screw-propelled
- Complement: 44
- Armament: one 12-pounder howitzer; one 30-pounder Parrott rifle

USS Trefoil was a 370-ton steamer purchased by the Union Navy at the last year of the American Civil War.

Trefoil, with a crew of 44 and a powerful Parrott rifle, was a respectable gunboat; but, the American Civil War was coming to a close, and she was relegated to the role of dispatch boat.

== Service history ==
Trefoil—a wooden-hulled screw steamer built in 1864 by clipper ship designer Donald McKay—was purchased by the Union Navy on 4 February 1865 and commissioned at the Boston Navy Yard, Boston, Massachusetts, on 1 March 1865, Acting Master Charles C. Wells in command. Trefoil proceeded south to the Gulf of Mexico and arrived at Mobile Bay on 24 March. She served in the West Gulf Blockading Squadron under Rear Admiral Henry Knox Thatcher through the end of the Civil War, operating mainly as a dispatch boat between Pensacola, Florida, and Mobile, Alabama. In July 1865, she returned north to the Boston Navy Yard where she was decommissioned on 30 August 1865. Placed in ordinary in 1866, the steamer was sold at auction on 28 May 1867 to a Mr. L. Litchfield.
