= CSS Colonel Lamb =

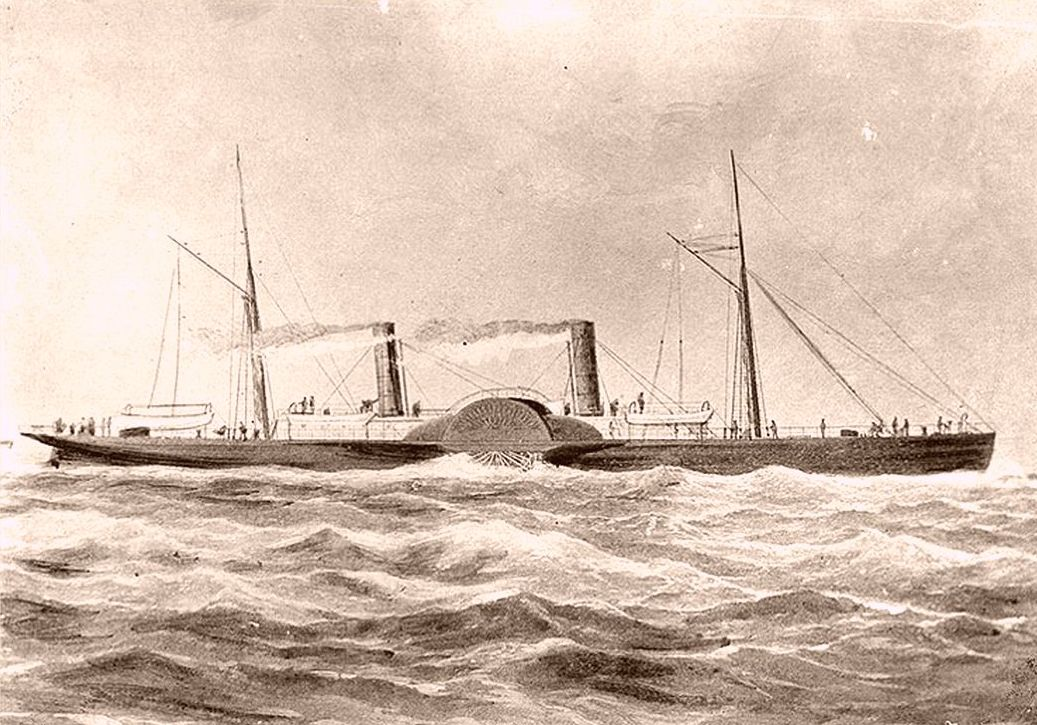
Blockade runner Colonel Lamb.

The CSS Colonel Lamb was a twin Confederate blockade runner of the CSS Hope who participated in the American Civil War.

== History ==
The CSS Colonel Lamb had a length of 281, a beam of 36, and a draft of 10, and was one of the most famous and successful blockade runners in the Confederate States Navy. She was built in 1864 by Jones, Quiggin & Company, a sister ship to the CSS Hope (which preceded it that year) but with a much longer house and without the usual turtle foredeck that the Hope had. She is identified with the handsome Captain Tom Lockwood and was christened by his wife. Shipbuilder Wiliiam Quiggin registered CSS Colonel Lamb in her name and then quietly transferred her to Confederate agent J. B. Lafitte, CSN in Nassau, where she was outfitted. She survived the war intact and was sold through Fraser, Trenholm & Co. to the Brazilian government; After loading a shipment of explosives for Brazil into Liverpool, she exploded at anchor in the river Mersey the night before setting sail.
