= USS General Thomas =

Gunboat of the United States Navy

History

United States
- Laid down: date unknown
- Launched: 1864
- Commissioned: 8 August 1864
- Out of service: 3 June 1865
- Stricken: 1865 (est.)
- Fate: Returned to the War Department; 3 June 1865

General characteristics
- Displacement: 184 tons
- Length: 165 ft (50 m)
- Beam: 26 ft (7.9 m)
- Draught: depth of hold 4 ft 6 in (1.37 m)
- Propulsion: steam engine; side wheel-propelled
- Speed: not known
- Complement: not known
- Armament: two 20-pounder Parrott rifles; four 24-pounder howitzers

USS General Thomas was a Steamship chartered from the U.S. War Department by the Union Navy during the American Civil War. Named after Maj. Gen. George Henry Thomas, she was used by the Navy as a gunboat in waterways of the Confederate South.

== Constructed in Chattanooga, Tennessee in 1864 ==
General Thomas was one of four light wooden gunboats built at Chattanooga, Tennessee, for the War Department in 1864. After cruising on the Ohio River without being formally commissioned in June and July 1864, she commissioned 8 August 1864 at Bridgeport, Alabama, Acting Master Gilbert Morton in command.

== Patrolling the Tennessee River ==
Assigned to the 11th district of the Mississippi Squadron, commanded by Lt. Mordeau Forrest, General Thomas served as a patrol vessel on the Tennessee River, above Muscle Shoals, Alabama.

During this period Confederate General John Bell Hood was mounting his campaign into Tennessee to divert General William Tecumseh Sherman's march on Atlanta, Georgia, and General Thomas patrolled the river unceasingly to prevent the Southern troops from crossing.

=== Engaged against the forces of Confederate General Hood ===
At Decatur, Alabama, 28 October 1864, the gunboat engaged strong batteries from General John Bell Hood's army. After passing the batteries downstream and sustaining several hits, General Thomas rounded to and, with Union Army gunboat Stone River, poured such a withering crossfire into the emplacements that the Confederates were forced to withdraw.

After Hood's repulse at Nashville, Tennessee in December, General Thomas was used on the upper Tennessee River to block his escape route. She aided General James B. Steedman in his successful attack on Decatur 27 December by giving his army concentrated gunfire support, and attempted to pass over Elk River Shoals to prevent a Southern crossing of the river. The Tennessee River was too low, however, and Forrest and his gunboats could not cross.

General Thomas returned to Bridgeport 30 December 1864, but was soon active again. On 26 February 1865 she joined the other gunboats of the 11th district and, taking advantage of unusually high water, crossed Elk River Shoals. The ships destroyed the camp of Southern General Philip D. Roddey, captured a quantity of supplies and destroyed communications at Lamb's Ferry before returning to Bridgeport 4 March.

== Post-war return to the War Department ==
General Thomas continued to patrol between Bridgeport and Decatur, Alabama, until she was turned over to the War Department at Bridgeport 3 June 1865.
