= USS Catalpa (1864) =

Tugboat of the United States Navy

History

United States
- Ordered: as Conqueror
- Laid down: date unknown
- Launched: 1864
- Acquired: 29 June 1864
- Commissioned: 12 July 1864
- Decommissioned: 1 September 1865
- Stricken: 1894 (est.)
- Fate: Sold, 23 July 1894

General characteristics
- Displacement: 191 tons
- Length: 105 ft 3 in (32.08 m)
- Beam: 22 ft 2 in (6.76 m)
- Draught: 9 ft (2.7 m)
- Propulsion: steam engine; screw-propelled
- Speed: not known
- Complement: 37
- Armament: two 24-pounder smoothbores; one 12-pounder smoothbore gun

USS Catalpa was a steamer acquired by the Union Navy during the American Civil War. She was used by the Navy for various purposes, but especially to patrol navigable waterways of the Confederacy to prevent the South from trading with other countries.

Catalpa, a screw tugboat, was built in Brooklyn, New York, in 1864 as Conqueror; purchased by the Navy 29 June 1864; commissioned 12 July 1864 and reported to the South Atlantic Blockading Squadron.

== Assigned to the South Atlantic Blockade ==
Throughout the remainder of the war, Catalpa operated with her Squadron along the South Carolina coast, performing the varied services with which she rendered valuable support to the successful blockade of the Confederacy.

She carried passengers and light cargo in addition to performing the usual tug services, and skillfully removed torpedoes (mines) and obstructions. She contributed her officers and men to operations in Broad River and Bull's Bay in which a naval brigade cooperated closely with Union Army forces in preparing for William Tecumseh Sherman's march to the sea, and in February 1865, stood up the Pedee River to Georgetown, South Carolina, where her landing party routed a band of Confederate horsemen, and raised the flag over the town.

== Decommissioning and continued Navy service ==
Catalpa was decommissioned 1 September 1865, and was used as a yard tug at New York City until 23 July 1894 when she was sold.
