= John T. Rennie =

Nineteenth-century Scottish ship-owner

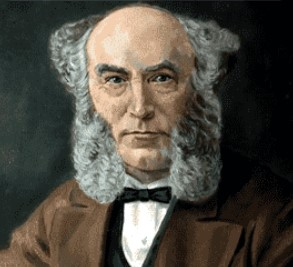
John T. Rennie

John Thomson Rennie (1824-1878) was a Scottish ship-owner who played an important role in the South African shipping business from the mid-nineteenth century, carrying mail, cattle, and passengers. Two of his steamers were sunk in accidents not long after he received them but he continued in business with other ships.

== Early life and family ==
John Rennie was born in Aberdeen in 1824, the son of George Rennie (d.1860) who owned a shipping business.

He married Isabella Abernethy (1827-1905) and they had nine children, seven of whom survived into adulthood.

== Career ==
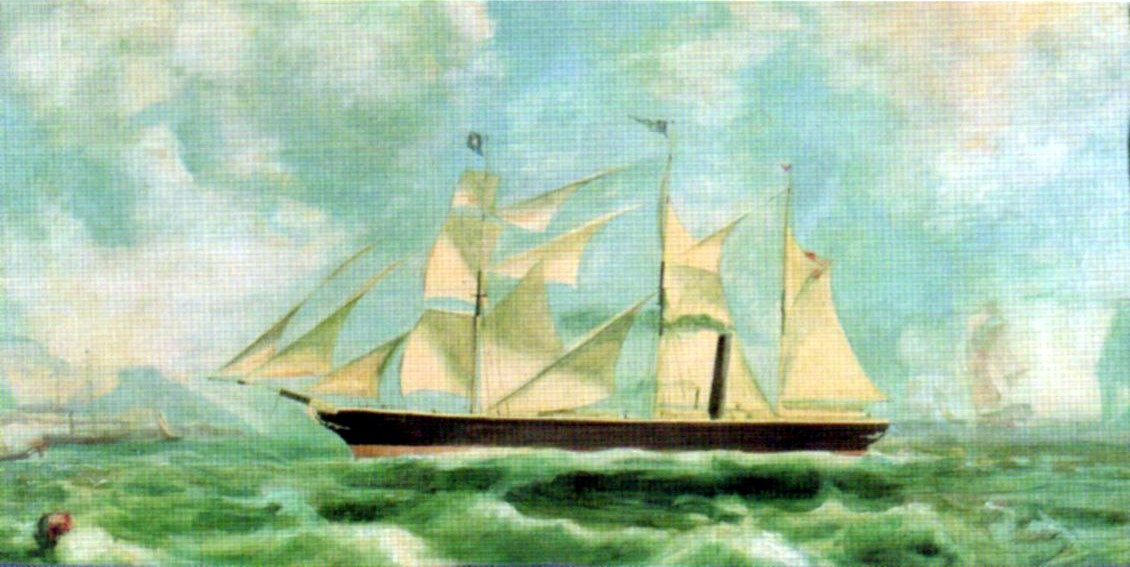
Madagascar, launched 1855.

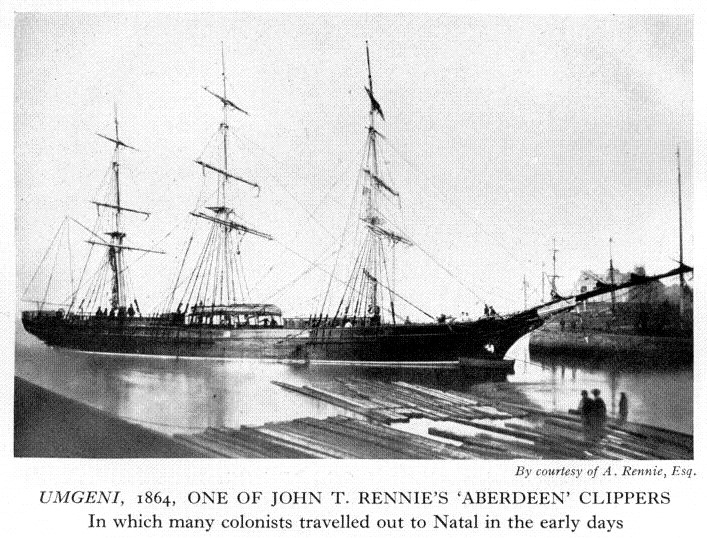
Umgeni, 1864.

Rennie was destined for a maritime career from an early age, becoming joint owner with his father of the sailing vessel Sampson which was registered in his sole name when he was 21.

He established his own business of John T. Rennie in Aberdeen in 1849 but subsequently moved it first to London and then to South Africa. There he transported cattle and had a contract from the Natal government to carry mail. He recognised the advantages of steam power and that coal from Natal's coal fields was cheaper than British coal. He had two steamers built by Scott & Company on the Clyde, the Madagascar, and the Waldensian.

In 1858 the steamer Madagascar was lost after hitting a reef near East London.

In 1862, the Waldensian was lost after it ran aground on rocks at Struis Point near Cape Agulhas en route from Durban to Cape Town. There was no loss of life.

In 1874, the Transvaal was lost on her maiden trip from London causing 12 deaths.

Rennie eventually lost the contract to transport mails but continued in business in other shipping activities. His name survives in Rennies Ships Agency in South Africa.

== Death ==
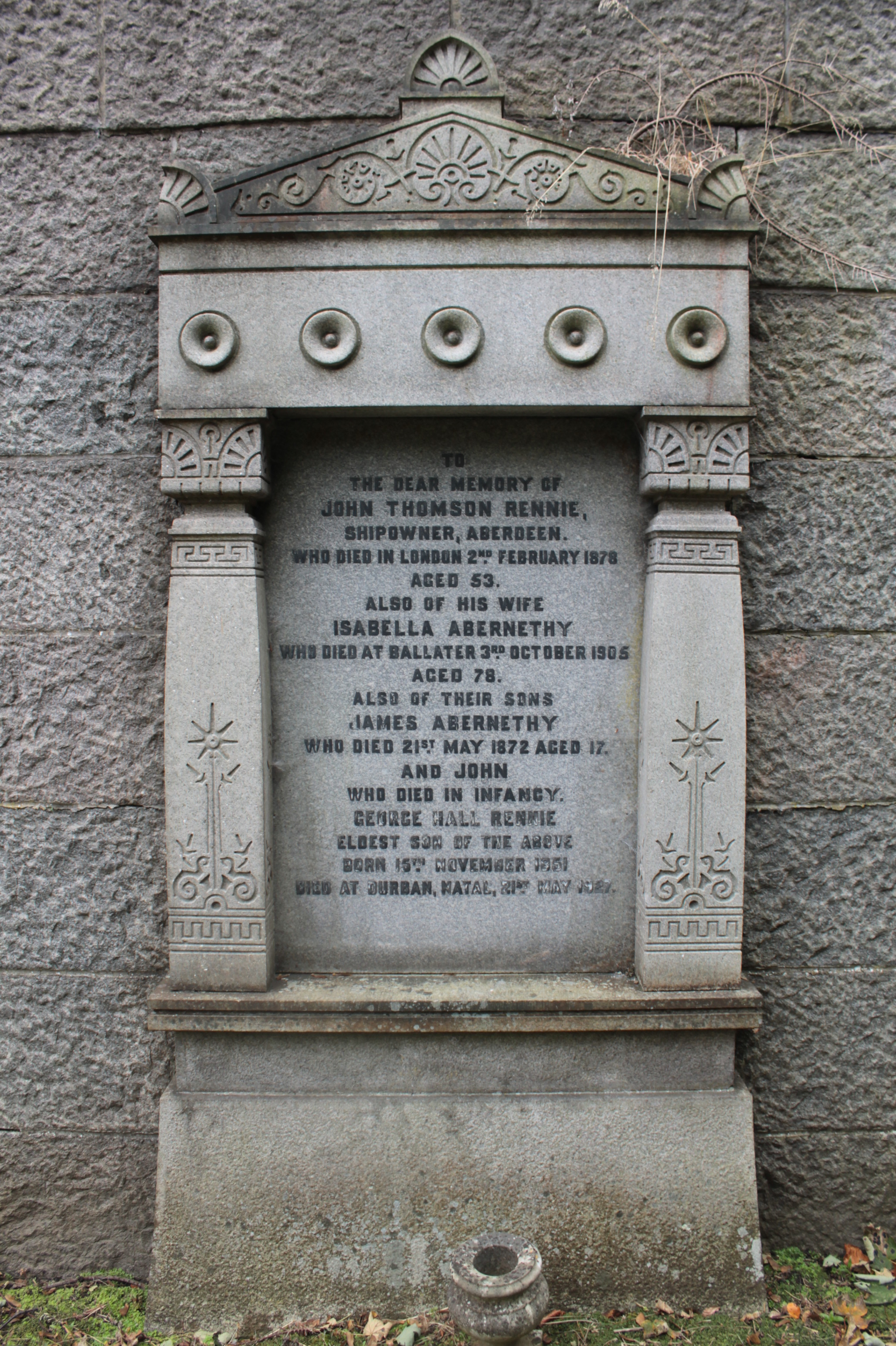
The grave of John Thomson Rennie, Nellfield Cemetery

He lived his final years at "Dee Mount" in Aberdeen.

Rennie died on 2 February 1878 and was buried in Nellfield Cemetery in Aberdeen, alongside his father.
