= Umgeni (1864 ship) =

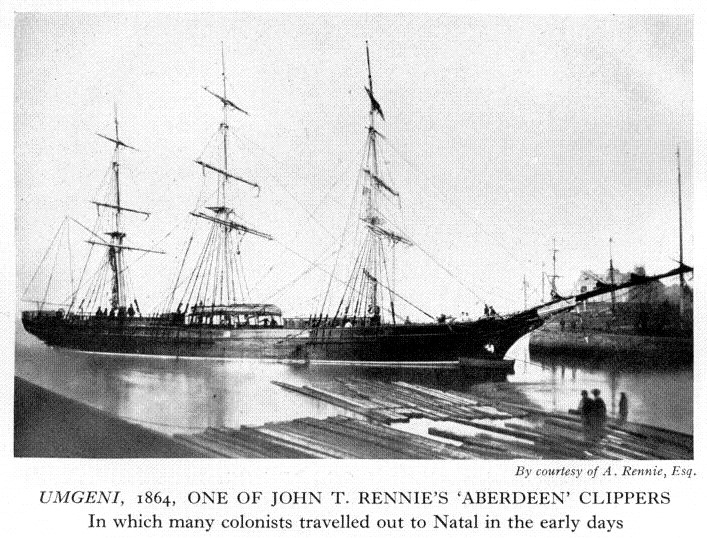
Umgeni, 1864.

The Umgeni was a sailing ship of the Rennie line. She was launched in 1864 and served as a passenger ship transporting colonists to Natal before being converted to a coal carrier. In 1876 she ran aground near Glenelg in South Australia but was re-floated.

== See also ==
- Umgeni River, Natal
