= Talisman (1864) =

The Talisman was an American merchant ship and blockade runner during the American Civil War. It sank in 1864; one of its crew was Clifford Lanier, brother of the poet Sidney Lanier, who was on the Lucy. The Talisman was part of a flotilla of blockade runners gathered in November 1864 near Cape Fear, but on December 19 ran onto the wreck of the CSS Raleigh, and had to return to Wilmington for repairs. It left Wilmington on December 26, and broke up during heavy seas on December 29 (David Jones says the ship left Wilmington on December 24). The crew, including Lanier, were saved by a Federal schooner.

According to data compiled by Civil War scholar Stephen R. Wise, the Talisman was a sidewheel steamer with an iron hull built by John Scott and Sons, in Greenock, Scotland, and owned/operated by William Boyle, of the Albion Trading Company. It measured 201.3 by 21.15 by 9.5, with 266 gt, 173 rt, 359 bt. It is reported as arriving in North Carolina ports on Oct. 1, Nov. 6, Dec. 8, 1864 (in all cases from Bermuda). It is reported as having left North Carolina ports on Oct. 19 and Nov. 19 1864, for Bermuda; it left on Dec. 18 and returned, and then on Dec. 26 and foundered. Operating in the Atlantic, it made a total of six attempts to break the blockade, succeeding five times.
