= USS Hibiscus =

Gunboat of the United States Navy

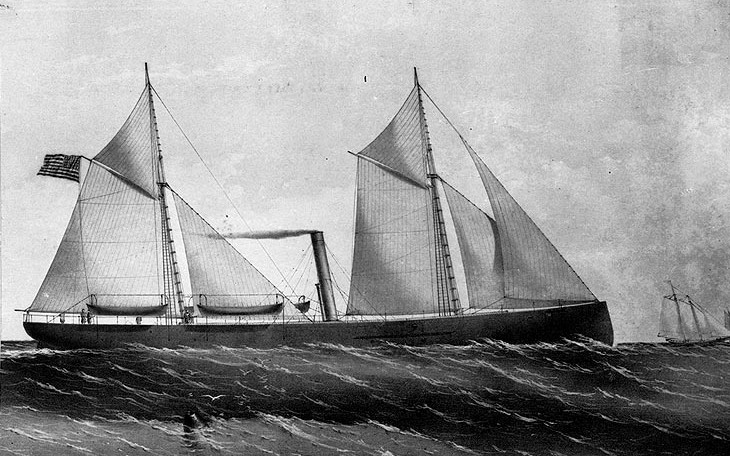
- Civil War era lithograph of USS Hibiscus (1864-1866).

History

United States
- Name: USS Hibiscus
- Namesake: Any of the herbs, shrubs, or trees of genus Hibiscus; many of which have large showy flowers.
- Owner: S. M. Pook
- Launched: 1864
- Acquired: 16 November 1864
- Commissioned: 29 December 1864
- Decommissioned: 19 August 1865
- Fate: Sold, 5 October 1866; Lost at sea on 1 May 1873

General characteristics
- Type: screw steamer
- Displacement: 490 tons
- Tons burthen: 406 tons
- Propulsion: steam engine; screw-propelled
- Speed: 9 knots (17 km/h; 10 mph)
- Armament: two 30-pounder guns; four 24-pounder guns

USS Hibiscus was a steamer acquired by the Union Navy towards the end of the American Civil War. She was used by the Navy to patrol navigable waterways of the Confederacy to prevent the South from trading with other countries.

== Service history ==
Hibiscus was purchased at New York City from S. M. Pook on 16 November 1864; and commissioned there on 29 December 1864, Lt. William L. Martine in command. The ship and her sister USS Spirea are described during trials in November 1864: "The new twin-screw steamer Hybiscus [sic] made her official trial trip in New York harbor on the 3d. This vessel and a sister ship were constructed for the purpose of demonstrating the plans of a light draught gunboat which should be able to carry a heavy battery, and at the same time to place the machinery so far below the water line as to preclude injury to it by the enemy’s shot. These vessels were planned and constructed by Mr. Samuel H. Pook, of Fair Haven, Conn. The engines selected for these vessels are known as Wright’s segmental engine. The Hybiscus, with about 25 pounds pressure of steam, made eleven knots, the engines working finely. The vessel was turned around in a very small space, and in four minutes and eighteen seconds of time. Her mean draught of water is 6 feet 7 inches, she drawing 6 feet 10 inches aft and 4 feet 4 inches forward, and this with her bunkers stowed full of coal."

She sailed from New York on 29 January 1865 and reached Tampa, Florida, via Port Royal, South Carolina, and Key West, Florida, on 17 February. Hibiscus patrolled out of Tampa until the end of July, putting in at Cedar Keys and St. Andrews Bay as well as Key West during this period. On 11 April 1865 off Crystal River, Sea Bird, which served as tender to Hibiscus, captured small Confederate sloops Florida and Annie with cargos of loose and baled cotton. With the end of the war, Hibiscus sailed north and on 11 August stood into New York. She decommissioned there 19 August 1865 and was sold 5 October 1866. Hibiscus sank off New Jersey 30 April 1873 (See New York Times, 2 May 1873, page 8). The shipwreck, known to local divers as the Emerald Wreck, has been tentatively identified as Hibiscus.

== See also ==
- Confederate States Navy
