= USS Colossus (1864) =

Gunboat of the United States Navy

History

United States
- Laid down: date unknown
- Launched: 1864
- Acquired: 6 December 1864
- Commissioned: 24 February 1865
- Decommissioned: 3 July 1865
- Stricken: 1865 (est.)
- Fate: Sold, 17 August 1865

General characteristics
- Displacement: 183 tons
- Length: 155 ft 2 in (47.29 m)
- Beam: 31 ft 9 in (9.68 m)
- Draft: 4 ft (1.2 m)
- Propulsion: steam engine; stern-wheel propelled
- Speed: 5 knots
- Complement: not known
- Armament: two 30-pounder guns; one 12-pounder smoothbore; four 24-pounder howitzers

USS Colossus was a steamer acquired by the Union Navy towards the end of the American Civil War. She was used to patrol navigable waterways of the Confederacy to prevent the South from trading with other countries.

Colossus, a stern wheel steamer, was built in 1864 at Freedom, Pennsylvania; purchased 6 December 1864 at Cincinnati, Ohio, by the U.S. Navy; outfitted at Mound City, Illinois; and commissioned 24 February 1865, Acting Master F. G. Sampson in command.

== Assigned to serve in the Mississippi Squadron ==
Serving in the Mississippi Squadron, Colossus patrolled the waters between Vicksburg, Mississippi, and the Arkansas River until 15 June 1865 when she returned to Mound City.

Colossus was placed out of commission 3 July 1865 and sold 17 August 1865.
