= PS Vulture =

History
- Name: PS Vulture
- Operator: 1865: Samuel Otis Johnson, Nassau; 1868: Thomas Brown; 1870–1873: Ford and Jackson; 1873–1886: Great Western Railway
- Port of registry: (United Kingdom)
- Builder: Aitken and Mansel Whiteinch
- Yard number: 6
- Launched: 18 August 1864
- Out of service: 1905
- Fate: Scrapped 1886

General characteristics
- Tonnage: 800 gross register tons (GRT)
- Length: 242 feet (74 m)
- Beam: 25.7 feet (7.8 m)
- Draught: 10.6 feet (3.2 m)
- Installed power: 200 hp

PS Vulture was a passenger vessel built in 1864. She served briefly as a blockade runner during the American Civil War. She then traded in British coastal waters until she was broken up in 1886.

== History ==
Aitken and Mansel Whiteinch built Vulture and launched her on 18 August 1864.

She departed Glasgow for Bermuda in October 1864. and served as a blockage runner in the American Civil War.

In 1865 she was advertised for sale. and by 1868 was operated by Thomas Brown between Glasgow and London. In 1870 Ford and Jackson acquired her and then employed her on services between Milford Haven and Waterford. In 1873 the Great Western Railway took over the route.

Vulture was broken up in 1886.
