= French ironclad Normandie =

French Gloire-class ironclad

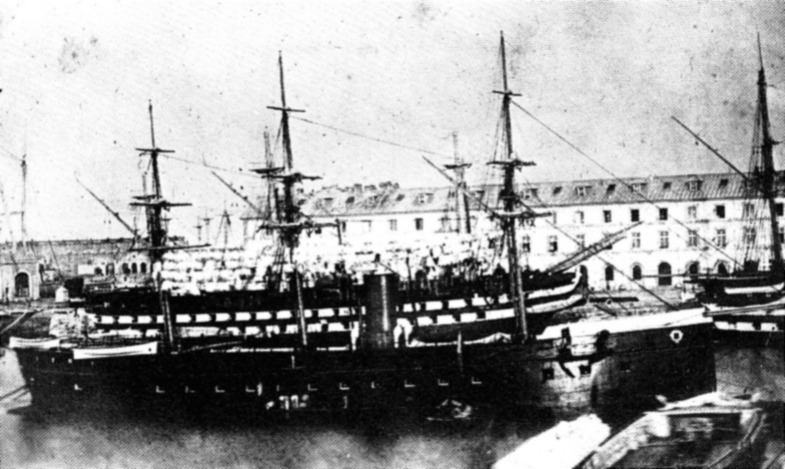
- Normandie in the foreground

History

France
- Name: Normandie
- Namesake: Normandy
- Ordered: About September 1858
- Builder: Arsenal de Cherbourg
- Laid down: 14 September 1858
- Launched: 10 March 1860
- Commissioned: 13 May 1862
- Decommissioned: 17 June 1871
- Stricken: 1 August 1871

General characteristics
- Class & type: Gloire-class ironclad
- Displacement: 5,650 t (5,560 long tons)
- Length: 77.25 m (253 ft 5 in)
- Beam: 17 m (55 ft 9 in)
- Draught: 8.48 m (27 ft 10 in)
- Depth of hold: 10.67 m (35 ft 0 in)
- Installed power: 2,500 ihp (1,900 kW); 8 oval boilers
- Propulsion: 1 × Shaft; 1 × HRCR-steam engine
- Sail plan: Barquentine rigged
- Speed: 13 knots (24 km/h; 15 mph)
- Range: 4,000 km (2,500 mi) at 8 knots (15 km/h; 9.2 mph)
- Complement: 570 officers and enlisted men
- Armament: As built: 36 × 164.7 mm (6.5 in) Mle 1858 rifled muzzle-loading guns; After 1868: 6 × Canon de 24 C modèle 1864 (9.4 in) Breech-loading guns; 2 × 194 mm (7.6 in) Mle 1864 breech-loading guns
- Armour: Hull: 120 mm (4.7 in); Conning tower: 100 mm (3.9 in); Deck: 10 mm (0.4 in)

The French ironclad Normandie was the third and last of the three wooden-hulled Gloire-class ironclads built for the French Navy in 1858–62. The ships of the Gloire class were classified as armoured frigates because they only had a single gun deck and their traditional disposition of guns arrayed along the length of the hull also meant that they were broadside ironclads. Normandie was the first ironclad to cross the Atlantic in support of the French intervention in Mexico in 1862. Although the ship was active during the Franco-Prussian War of 1870–71, she saw no action. The unseasoned timber of her hull rotted quickly; she was condemned in 1871 and subsequently scrapped.

== Design and description ==
Designed by the French naval architect Henri Dupuy de Lôme, the ships of the class were intended to fight in the line of battle, unlike the first British ironclads. The ship was 77.25 metres (253 ft 5 in) long, with a beam of 17 metres (55 ft 9 in). Normandie had a maximum draft of 8.48 metres (27 ft 10 in), a depth of hold of 10.67 metres (35 ft 0 in) and displaced 5,650 tonnes (5,560 long tons). The ships of the class had a high metacentric height of 2.1 metres (7 ft) and consequently rolled badly. With their gun ports only 1.88 metres (6 ft 2 in) above the waterline, they proved to be very wet.

Normandie had a single horizontal return connecting-rod compound steam engine that drove one propeller. The engine was powered by eight Indret oval boilers and was designed for a capacity of 2,500 indicated horsepower (1,900 kW). She carried a maximum of 675 tonnes (664 long tons) of coal which allowed her to steam for 4,000 kilometres (2,500 mi) at a speed of 8 knots (15 km/h; 9.2 mph). The Gloire-class ships were initially fitted with a light barquentine rig with three masts that had a sail area around 1,100 square metres (11,800 sq ft). This was later changed to a full ship rig of 2,500 square metres (27,000 sq ft), but later had to be reduced because of excessive rolling.

The Gloire-class ships were armed with 36 Modèle 1858 164.7-millimetre (6.5 in) broadside. The remaining two guns were placed on the upper deck as chase guns. They fired a 44.9-kilogram (99.0 lb) shell at a muzzle velocity of only 322 metres per second (1,060 ft/s) and proved to be ineffective against armour. They were replaced by rifled breech-loading Modèle 1864 guns in 1868. Six 240-millimetre (9.4 in) guns were mounted in the centre of the gun deck and a pair of 194-millimetre (7.6 in) guns replaced the original chase guns.

Normandie's wooden hull was completely armoured with wrought iron plates 120 millimetres (4.7 in) thick. Backed by the 760-millimetre (30 in) sides of the hull, the armour extended 5.4 metres (17 ft 9 in) above the waterline and 2.0 metres (6 ft 7 in) below. The Gloire-class ships had an open-topped conning tower with armour 100 millimetres (3.9 in) thick and 10 millimetres (0.4 in) of armour underneath the wooden upper deck.

== Construction and service ==
Named after the province of Normandy, Normandie was ordered around September 1858, six months after her sisters. The ship was laid down at the Arsenal de Cherbourg on 14 September 1858, launched on 10 March 1860 and completed on 13 May 1862. In July 1862, Normandie became the first ironclad to cross the Atlantic, as the flagship of Vice Admiral Edmond Jurien de La Gravière, on her way to support the French intervention in Mexico. She was forced to return in April 1863 due to an outbreak of yellow fever that killed her captain, among others. While assigned to the Mediterranean Fleet, the ship made a port visit in August 1865 to Brest where the fleet hosted the British Channel Fleet. A few days later the French fleet made a reciprocal visit to Portsmouth where it was hosted by the Channel Fleet. From 1865 to 1868, Normandie was assigned to the Evolutionary Squadron where she was commanded by Bernard Jauréguiberry, among others. The ship was assigned to the ironclad squadron commanded by Rear Admiral Didelot during the Franco-Prussian War, but saw no action. Built of unseasoned timber, Normandie was in poor shape after the war and was decommissioned on 17 June 1871. Condemned on 1 August, the ship was subsequently broken up and her engine was installed in the breastwork monitor Tonnerre.
