= French ironclad Solférino =

Warship

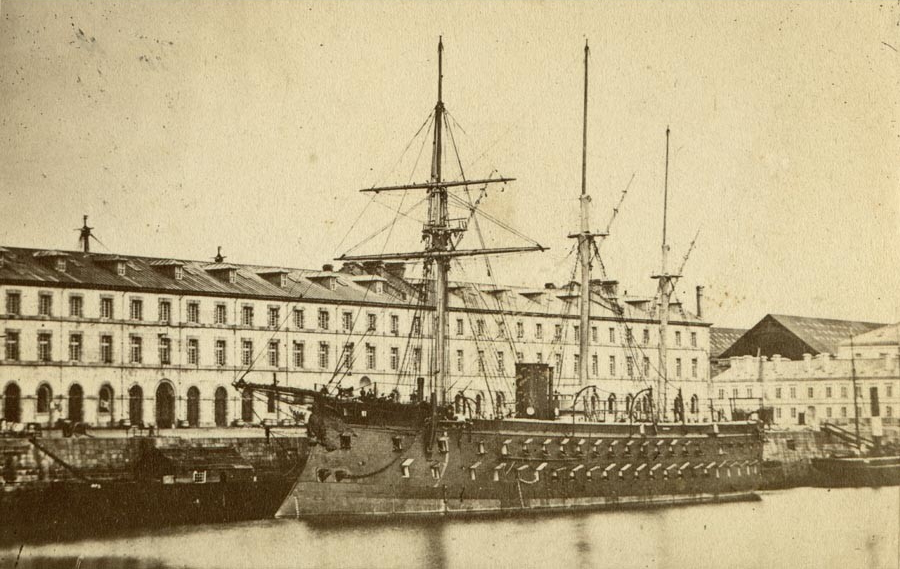
- Solférino in Cherbourg, c. 1863–1864

History

France
- Name: Solférino
- Namesake: Battle of Solferino
- Builder: Arsenal de Lorient
- Laid down: 24 June 1859
- Launched: 24 June 1861
- Commissioned: 25 August 1862
- Decommissioned: August 1878
- Fate: Condemned, 21 July 1882

General characteristics (as built)
- Class & type: Magenta-class ironclad
- Displacement: 6,796 t (6,689 long tons)
- Length: 85.51 m (280 ft 7 in)
- Beam: 17.34 m (56 ft 11 in)
- Draft: 8.44 m (27 ft 8 in)
- Installed power: 8 boilers; 4,019 PS (2,956 kW) (trials)
- Propulsion: 1 shaft, 1 horizontal-return connecting rod-steam engine
- Sail plan: Barquentine-rig
- Speed: 12.88 knots (23.85 km/h; 14.82 mph) (trials)
- Range: 1,840 nautical miles (3,410 km; 2,120 mi) at 10 knots (19 km/h; 12 mph)
- Complement: 674
- Armament: 16 × single 194 mm (7.6 in) smoothbore muzzle-loading guns; 34 × single 164.7 mm (6.5 in) rifled muzzle-loading (RML) guns; 2 × 225 mm (8.9 in) RML howitzers
- Armor: Belt: 120 mm (4.7 in); Battery: 109–120 mm (4.3–4.7 in)

Solférino was the second and last ship of the Magenta class of broadside ironclads built for the French Navy (Marine nationale) in the early 1860s.

These two ironclads were the only two-decked broadside ironclad battleships ever built. They were also the first ships in the world to be equipped with a spur ram.

== Design and description ==
The Magenta class were two-decked ironclad ships of the line, much as the preceding Gloire-class ironclad were armored versions of traditional frigates. Solférino was 85.51 m (280 ft 7 in) long, had a beam of 17.34 meters (56 ft 11 in), and a draft of 8.44 meters (27 ft 8 in). The ship displaced 6,796 t (6,689 long tons). The Magentas were equipped with a metal-reinforced, spur-shaped ram, the first ironclads to be fitted with a ram, and they had a crew of 674 officers and enlisted men.

The Magenta-class ships had a single two-cylinder horizontal-return connecting-rod compound steam engine that drove the propeller shaft, using steam provided by eight boilers. The engine was rated at 1,000 nominal horsepower or 3,450 metric horsepower (2,540 kW) and was intended to give the ships a speed in excess of 13 knots (24 km/h; 15 mph). During their sea trials, Solférino achieved a speed of 12.88 knots (23.85 km/h; 14.82 mph) from 4,012 metric horsepower (2,951 kW). The Magenta class carried enough coal to allow them to steam for 1,840 nautical miles (3,410 km; 2,120 mi) at a speed of 10 knots (19 km/h; 12 mph). They were originally fitted with a three-masted barquentine rig that had a sail area of 1,711 square meters (18,420 sq ft), but they were re-rigged as barques with 1,960 m^{2} (21,100 sq ft) in 1864–1865.

=== Armament ===
The design of the Magenta class was rather unique, because they were ironclads with two covered gun decks. Its lower gun deck was 1.96 m high. This was much higher than the gun decks of Couronne (1.79 m) and Gloire (1.81 m) which were found to be low. As designed, Solférino would get 48 canons de 16 cm modèle 1858-60. This armament was changed on multiple occasions.

On 4 January 1864 the armament was determined as:

- Upper deck: 2 * 22 cm rifled shell guns (muzzle-loading) on pivot mounts as chase guns fore and aft
- Upper gun deck: 24 * 16 cm rifled muzzle-loading (RML) Modèle 1858–60 guns
- Lower gun deck: 16 * 194-millimeter (7.6 in) (50-pdr) smoothbore muzzle-loading guns and 10 * 16 cm Modèle 1858–60 RML

On 20 October 1866, the lower battery was disarmed and a new configuration was determined:

- Upper deck: 4 * Canon de 24 C modèle 1864 (9.4 in)
- Upper gun deck: 6 * Canon de 24 C modèle 1864 (9.4 in) and 12 * Canon de 19 C modèle 1864 (7.6 in)
- Lower gun deck: empty

In February 1868, this was changed again to:

- Upper deck: 4 * Canon de 24 C modèle 1864 (9.4 in)
- Upper gun deck: 6 * Canon de 24 C modèle 1864 (9.4 in)
- Lower gun deck: empty

In December 1868, this was changed to:

- Upper deck: 4 * Canon de 19 C modèle 1864 (7.6 in)
- Upper gun deck: 10 * Canon de 24 C modèle 1864 (9.4 in)
- Lower gun deck: empty

=== Protection ===
The Magentas had a full-length waterline belt that consisted of wrought-iron plates 120 mm (4.7 in) thick. Above the belt both gun decks were protected with 109 mm (4.3 in) of armor, but the ends of the ships were unprotected.

== Construction and service ==
Solférino, named after the French victory in the Battle of Solferino, was laid down on 24 June 1859 by the Arsenal de Lorient, launched on 24 June 1861 and commissioned on 25 August 1862.

== Bibliography ==
- Ministère de la Marine et des Colonies (1873). Aide-Mémoire d'artillerie Navale Chapter 4-6. Georges Chamerot, Paris.
- de Balincourt, Captain & Vincent-Bréchignac, Captain (1974). "The French Navy of Yesterday: Ironclad Frigates, Part I". F.P.D.S. Newsletter. II (2): 18. OCLC 41554533.
- de Balincourt, Captain & Vincent-Bréchignac, Captain (1974). "The French Navy of Yesterday: Ironclad Frigates, Pt. II". F.P.D.S. Newsletter. II (3): 23–25. OCLC 41554533.
- Campbell, N. J. M. (1979). "France". In Chesneau, Roger & Kolesnik, Eugene M. (eds.). Conway's All the World's Fighting Ships 1860–1905. Greenwich, UK: Conway Maritime Press. pp. 282–333. ISBN 0-8317-0302-4.
- Gille, Eric (1999). Cent ans de cuirassés français [A Century of French Battleships] (in French). Nantes: Marines. ISBN 2-909-675-50-5.
- Jones, Colin (1996). "Entente Cordiale, 1865". In McLean, David & Preston, Antony (eds.). Warship 1996. London: Conway Maritime Press. ISBN 0-85177-685-X.
- Konstam, Angus (2019). European Ironclads 1860–75: The Gloire Sparks the Great Ironclad Arms Race. Oxford, UK: Osprey Publishing. ISBN 978-1-47282-676-3.
- Roberts, Stephen S. (2021). French Warships in the Age of Steam 1859–1914: Design, Construction, Careers and Fates. Barnsley, UK: Seaforth Publishing. ISBN 978-1-5267-4533-0.
- Roche, Jean-Michel (2005). Dictionnaire des bâtiments de la flotte de guerre française de Colbert à nos jours, 1671 – 1870. Group Retozel-Maury Millau. ISBN 978-2-9525917-0-6. OCLC 165892922.
- Silverstone, Paul H. (1984). Directory of the World's Capital Ships. New York: Hippocrene Books. ISBN 0-88254-979-0.
- Wilson, H. W. (1896). Ironclads in Action: A Sketch of Naval Warfare From 1855 to 1895. Vol. 1 and 2. Boston: Little, Brown.
- Winfield, Rif & Roberts, Stephen S. (2015). French Warships in the Age of Sail, 1786–1861. Barnsley, UK: Seaforth Publishing. ISBN 978-1-84832-204-2.
