= French ironclad Gloire =

Gloire-class ironclad

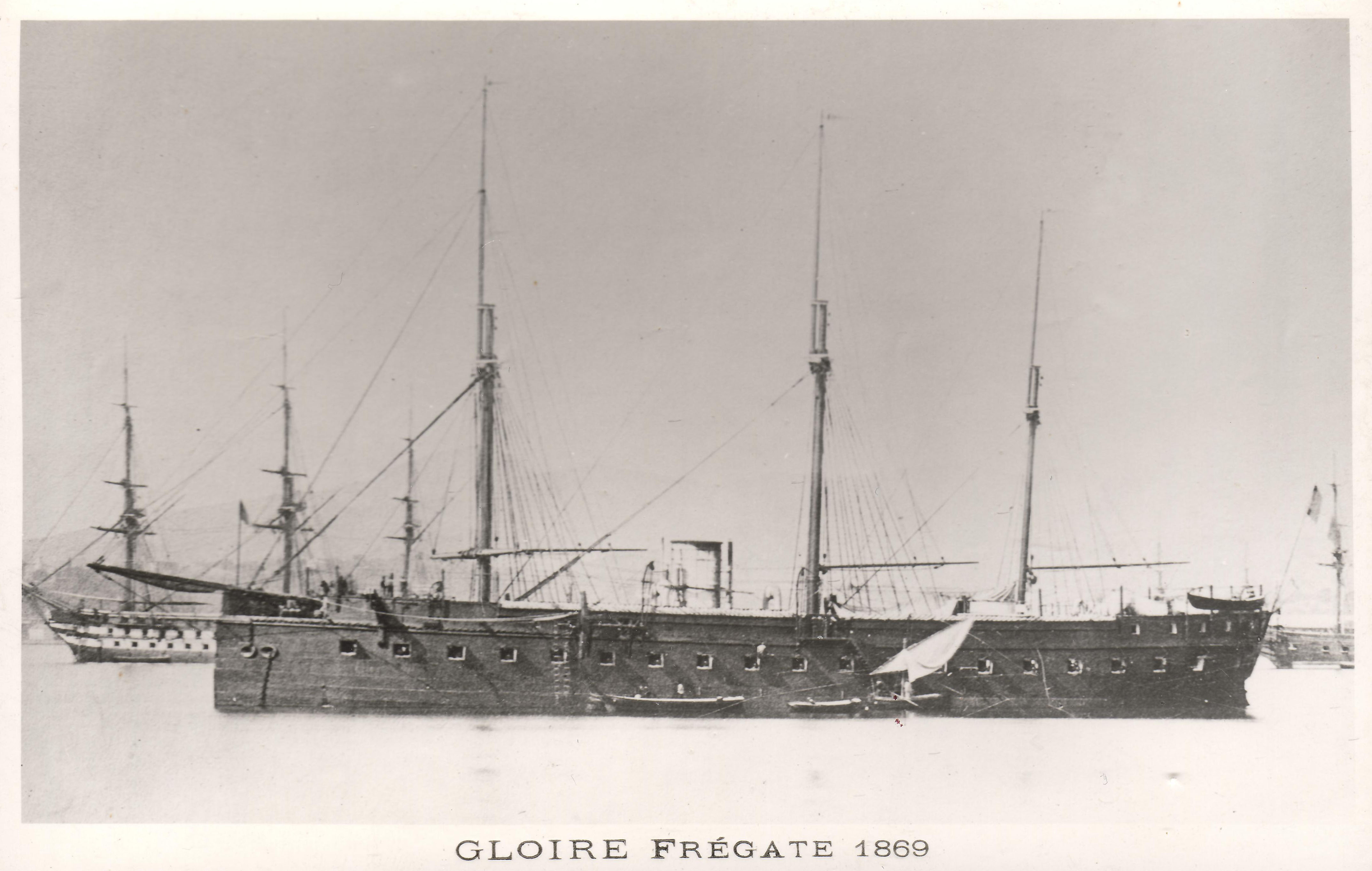
- Gloire anchored, 1869

History

France
- Name: Gloire
- Namesake: Glory
- Laid down: 4 March 1858
- Launched: 24 November 1859
- Completed: August 1860
- Stricken: 1879
- Fate: Scrapped, 1883

General characteristics
- Class & type: Gloire-class ironclad
- Displacement: 5,618 t (5,529 long tons)
- Length: 78.22 m (256 ft 8 in)
- Beam: 17 m (55 ft 9 in)
- Draught: 8.48 m (27 ft 10 in)
- Depth of hold: 10.67 m (35 ft 0 in)
- Installed power: 2,500 ihp (1,900 kW); 8 oval boilers
- Propulsion: 1 × Shaft; 1 × HRCR-steam engine
- Sail plan: Barquentine rigged
- Speed: 13 knots (24 km/h; 15 mph)
- Range: 4,000 km (2,500 mi) at 8 knots (15 km/h; 9.2 mph)
- Complement: 570 officers and enlisted men
- Armament: As built: 36 × 164 mm (6.5 in) Mle 1858 rifled muzzle-loading guns; After 1868: 6 × Canon de 24 C modèle 1864 (9.4 in) Breech-loading guns; 2 × Canon de 19 C modèle 1864 (7.6 in) Mle 1866 Breech-loading guns
- Armour: Hull: 120 mm (4.7 in); Conning tower: 100 mm (3.9 in)

The French ironclad Gloire (French pronunciation: [ɡlwaʁ], "Glory") was the first ocean-going ironclad, launched in 1859. It was developed after the Crimean War, in response to new developments of naval gun technology, especially the Paixhans guns and rifled guns, which used explosive shells with increased destructive power against wooden ships. Its design was also influenced by the Anglo-French development of ironclad floating batteries to bombard Russian forts during the same war.

== Design and construction ==
Gloire was designed by the French naval architect Henri Dupuy de Lôme as a 5,630-ton broadside ironclad with a wooden hull. He had intended for its class, the Gloire-class ironclads, to be fully iron hulled, and with this in mind Dupuy had cancelled all French Navy wooden hulled construction projects. Issues with obtaining enough iron meant that Dupuy compromised; Gloire and its first two sisters were built with wooden hulls lined with wrought iron plates. Gloire was ordered on 4 March 1858 and laid down in the same month. Its 12 cm-thick (4.7 in) armour plates, backed with 43 cm (17 in) of timber, resisted hits by the experimental shooting of the strongest guns of the time (the French 50-pounder and the British 68-pounder) at full charge, at a distance of 20 metres (65 ft).

Gloire's maximum speed was 13.1 knots but other reports suggested no more than 11.75 knots had been attained and that 11 knots was the practical maximum. French planning envisaged its being able to chase the British Channel Fleet out of the English Channel with its speed. As was common for the era, Gloire was constructed with sails as well as a steam-powered screw. The original rigging was a light barquentine rig providing 1,096 sq. m (11,800 sq. ft) of surface area. This was later increased to a full rig providing 2,508 sq. m (27,000 sq. ft) of surface.

Reports regarding the construction of Gloire reached France's British rivals in May 1858. A public outcry fomented by the newspapers led the Surveyor of the Navy to announce a need to match the new French design; "France has now commenced to build frigates of great speed with their sides protected by thick metal plates, and this renders it imperative for this country to do the same without a moment's delay". This led to the construction of the armoured frigate HMS Warrior.

Gloire was launched on 24 November 1859 and completed for service in August 1860.

== Service ==
Gloire was launched at the arsenal of Mourillon, Toulon, on 24 November 1859; and entered service in August 1860. It was struck off the French naval register in 1879, and scrapped in 1883.

The ship underwent preliminary trials in June 1860 with official trials on 20-21 of August, where it achieved 13.5 knots. In September of that year, it escorted the imperial yacht Aigle carrying Emperor Napoleon III to Algiers. During a storm on the return voyage, the Gloire was the sole escort able to remain with the Aigle. On 12 November, Gloire began comparative trials with the Algésiras, culminating in a trial report on 30 March 1861.

== Importance in naval history ==
As the first ocean-going ironclad, Gloire rendered obsolete traditional unarmoured wooden ships-of-the-line, and all major navies soon began to build ironclads of their own.

== Gallery ==
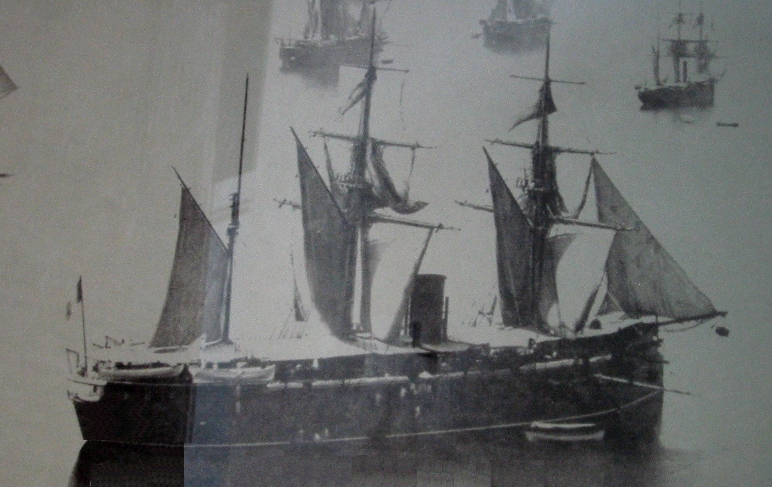
Photograph of Gloire, circa 1860, at the Musée de la Marine, Paris.

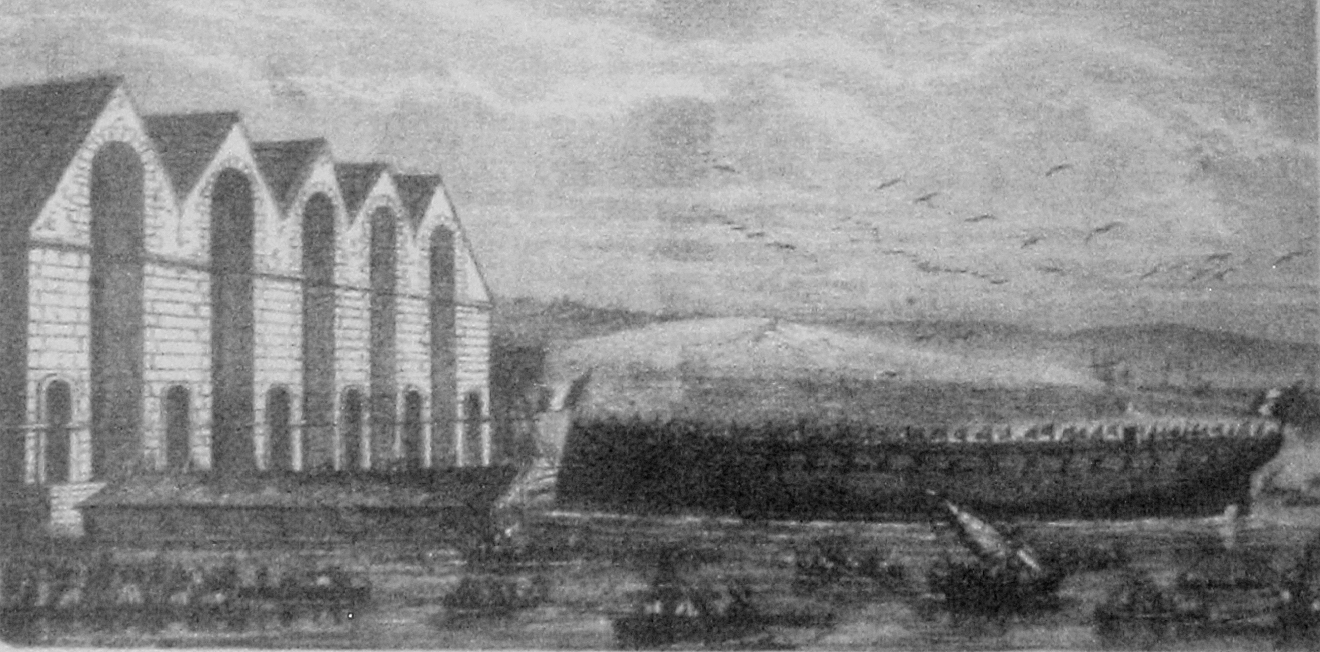
The launch of Gloire.

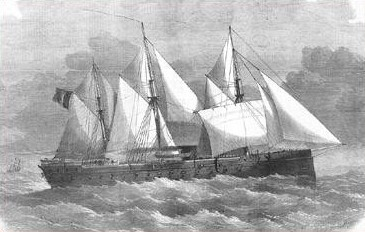
Gloire sailing, 19th century print.

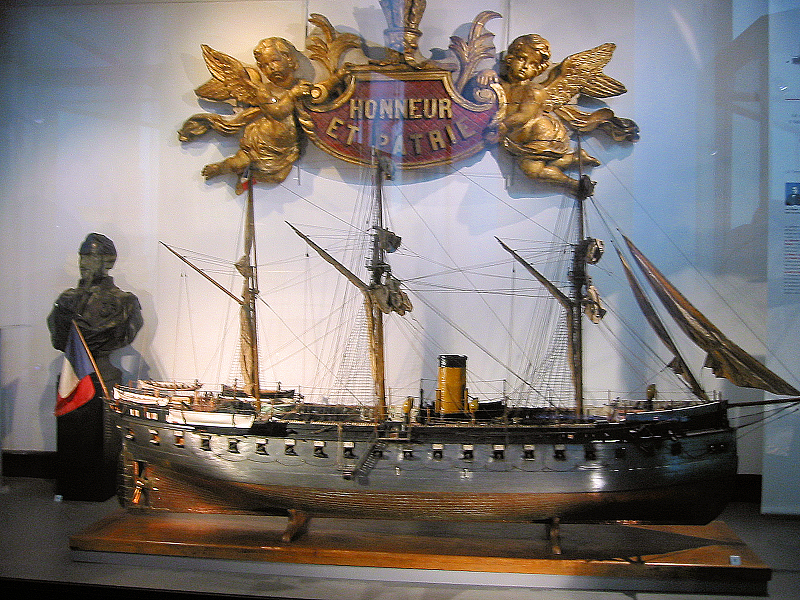
Scale model of Gloire at the Musée de la Marine.

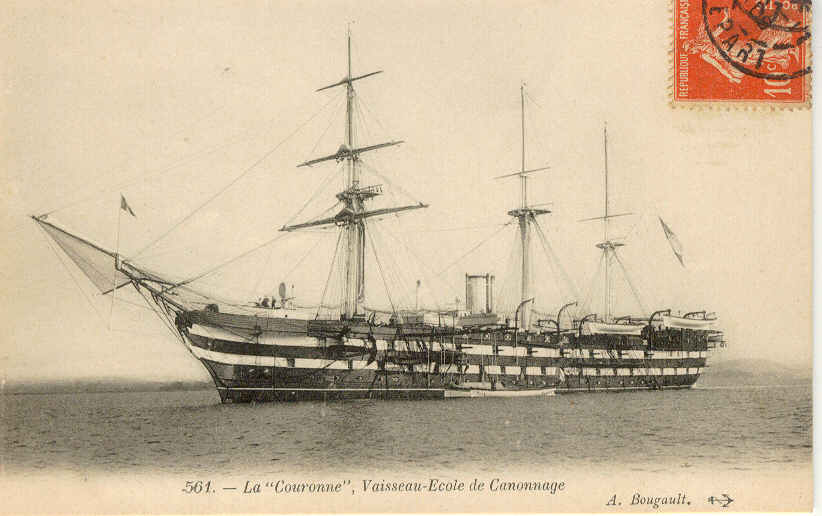
Couronne, near sister-ship of Gloire after it was rebuilt.

== Bibliography ==
- de Balincourt, Captain & Vincent-Bréchignac, Captain (1974). "The French Navy of Yesterday: Ironclad Frigates, Part I". F.P.D.S. Newsletter. II (2): 12–15, 18. OCLC 41554533.
- Campbell, N. J. M. (1979). "France". In Chesneau, Roger & Kolesnik, Eugene M. (eds.). Conway's All the World's Fighting Ships 1860–1905. Greenwich: Conway Maritime Press. pp. 283–333. ISBN 0-8317-0302-4.
- Brownlee, Walter (1987). Warrior: The First Modern Battleship. Cambridge: Cambridge University Press. ISBN 0-521-27579-2.
- Gardiner, Robert, ed. (1992). Steam, Steel and Shellfire: The Steam Warship 1815–1905. Conway's History of the Ship. London: Conway Maritime Press. ISBN 1-55750-774-0.
- Gille, Eric (1999). Cent ans de cuirassés français [A Century of French Battleships] (in French). Nantes: Marines. ISBN 2-909-675-50-5.
- Jones, Colin (1996). "Entente Cordiale, 1865". In McLean, David & Preston, Antony (eds.). Warship 1996. London: Conway Maritime Press. ISBN 0-85177-685-X.
- Roberts, Stephen S. (2021). French Warships in the Age of Steam 1859–1914: Design, Construction, Careers and Fates. Barnsley, UK: Seaforth Publishing. ISBN 978-1-5267-4533-0.
- Roche, Jean-Michel (2005). Dictionnaire des bâtiments de la flotte de guerre française de Colbert à nos jours [A Dictionary of French Warships from Colbert to Today] (in French). Vol. I: 1671 – 1870. Group Retozel-Maury Millau. ISBN 978-2-9525917-0-6. OCLC 165892922.
- Silverstone, Paul H. (1984). Directory of the World's Capital Ships. New York: Hippocrene Books. ISBN 0-88254-979-0.
