= French ironclad Invincible =

French Gloire-class ironclad

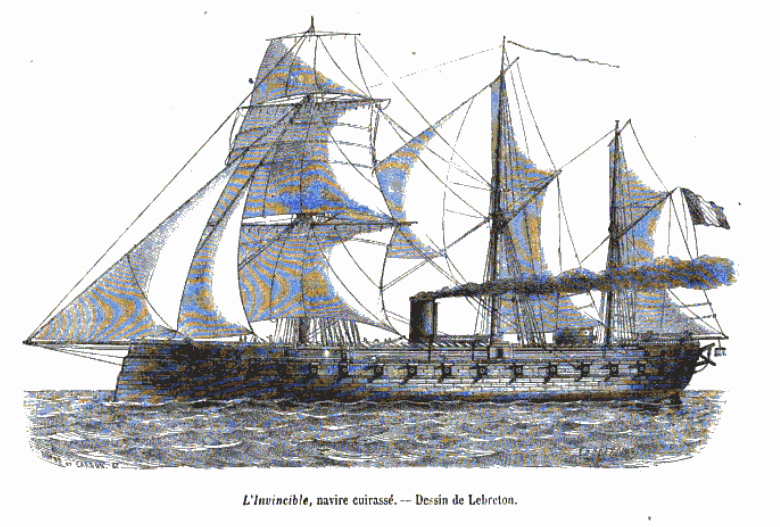
- Portrait of Invincible by Louis Lebreton

History

France
- Name: Invincible
- Ordered: 4 March 1858
- Builder: Arsenal de Toulon
- Laid down: 1 May 1858
- Launched: 4 April 1861
- Completed: March 1862
- Stricken: 12 August 1872
- Fate: Scrapped, 1876

General characteristics
- Class & type: Gloire-class ironclad
- Displacement: 5,650 t (5,560 long tons)
- Length: 77.25 m (253 ft 5 in)
- Beam: 17 m (55 ft 9 in)
- Draught: 8.48 m (27 ft 10 in)
- Depth of hold: 10.67 m (35 ft 0 in)
- Installed power: 2,500 ihp (1,900 kW); 8 oval boilers
- Propulsion: 1 × Shaft; 1 × Horizontal return connecting rod-steam engine
- Sail plan: Barquentine rigged
- Speed: 13 knots (24 km/h; 15 mph)
- Range: 4,000 km (2,500 mi) at 8 knots (15 km/h; 9.2 mph)
- Complement: 570 officers and enlisted men
- Armament: As built: 36 × 164.7 mm (6.5 in) Mle 1858 rifled muzzle-loading guns; After 1868: 6 × Canon de 24 C modèle 1864 (9.4 in) Breech-loading guns breech-loading guns; 2 × 194 mm (7.6 in) Mle 1864 breech-loading guns
- Armour: Hull: 120 mm (4.7 in); Conning tower: 100 mm (3.9 in); Deck: 10 mm (0.4 in)

The French ironclad Invincible was the second of the three wooden-hulled Gloire-class ironclads built for the French Navy in 1858–1862. The ships of the Gloire class were classified as armoured frigates because they only had a single gun deck and their traditional disposition of guns arrayed along the length of the hull also meant that they were broadside ironclads. Invincible had an uneventful career and was deployed in North American waters during the Franco-Prussian War of 1870–71. The unseasoned timber of her hull rotted quickly and she was condemned in 1872 and scrapped in 1876.

== Design and description ==
Designed by the French naval architect Henri Dupuy de Lôme, the ships of the class were intended to fight in the line of battle, unlike the first British ironclads. The ship was 77.25 metres (253 ft 5 in) long, with a beam of 17 metres (55 ft 9 in). Invincible had a maximum draft of 8.48 metres (27 ft 10 in), a depth of hold of 10.67 metres (35 ft 0 in) and displaced 5,650 tonnes (5,560 long tons). The ships of the class had a high metacentric height of 2.1 metres (7 ft) and consequently rolled badly. With their gun ports only 1.88 metres (6 ft 2 in) above the waterline, they proved to be very wet. She had a crew of 570 officers and enlisted men.

Invincible had a single horizontal return connecting-rod compound steam engine that drove one propeller. The engine was powered by eight Indret oval boilers and was designed for a capacity of 2,500 indicated horsepower (1,900 kW). On sea trials, Invincible reached 13.2 knots (24.4 km/h; 15.2 mph). She carried a maximum of 675 tonnes (664 long tons) of coal which allowed her to steam for 4,000 kilometres (2,500 mi) at a speed of 8 knots (15 km/h; 9.2 mph). The Gloire-class ships were initially fitted with a light barquentine rig with three masts that had a sail area around 1,100 square metres (11,800 sq ft). This was later changed to a full ship rig of 2,500 square metres (27,000 sq ft), but later had to be reduced because of excessive rolling.

The Gloire-class ships were armed with 36 Modèle 1858 164.7-millimetre (6.5 in) rifled muzzle-loading guns, 34 of which were positioned on the single gun deck in the broadside. The remaining two guns were placed on the upper deck as chase guns. They fired a 44.9-kilogram (99.0 lb) shell at a muzzle velocity of only 322 metres per second (1,060 ft/s) and proved to be ineffective against armour. They were replaced by rifled breech-loading Modèle 1864 guns in 1868. Six 240-millimetre (9.4 in) guns were mounted in the centre of the gun deck and a pair of 194-millimetre (7.6 in) guns replaced the original chase guns.

Invincible's wooden hull was completely armoured with wrought iron plates 120 millimetres (4.7 in) thick. Backed by the 760-millimetre (30 in) sides of the hull, the armour extended 5.4 metres (17 ft 9 in) above the waterline and 2.0 metres (6 ft 7 in) below. The Gloire-class ships had an open-topped conning tower with armour 100 millimetres (3.9 in) thick and 10 millimetres (0.4 in) of armour underneath the wooden upper deck.

== Construction and service ==
Ordered on 4 March 1858, Invincible was laid down at the Arsenal de Toulon on 1 May 1858, launched on 4 April 1861 and completed in March 1862. In September–October 1863, she conducted tactical trials with other ironclads. While assigned to the Mediterranean Fleet, the ship made a port visit in August 1865 to Brest where the fleet hosted the British Channel Fleet. As part of the festivities, Invincible put on a banquet for the midshipmen of both fleets that was reportedly the noisiest and most enjoyable of the visit. A few days later the French fleet made a reciprocal visit to Portsmouth where it was hosted by the Channel Fleet. During the Franco-Prussian War of 1870–71, the ship was sent to defend the islands of Saint Pierre and Miquelon from Prussian commerce raiders. (Note: Sources are contradictory about the ship's activities during the Franco-Prussian War. Wilson claims that she was assigned to Vice Admiral Léon Martin Fourichon's squadron that blockaded German ports in the Heligoland Bight during the war, but Gille and de Balincourt and Vincent-Bréchignac maintain that she was sent to North America.) Built of unseasoned timber, Invincible was in poor shape upon her return and was decommissioned. Removed from the naval register on 12 August 1872, the ship was scrapped in 1876 at Cherbourg.
