= Canon de 19 C modèle 1864 =

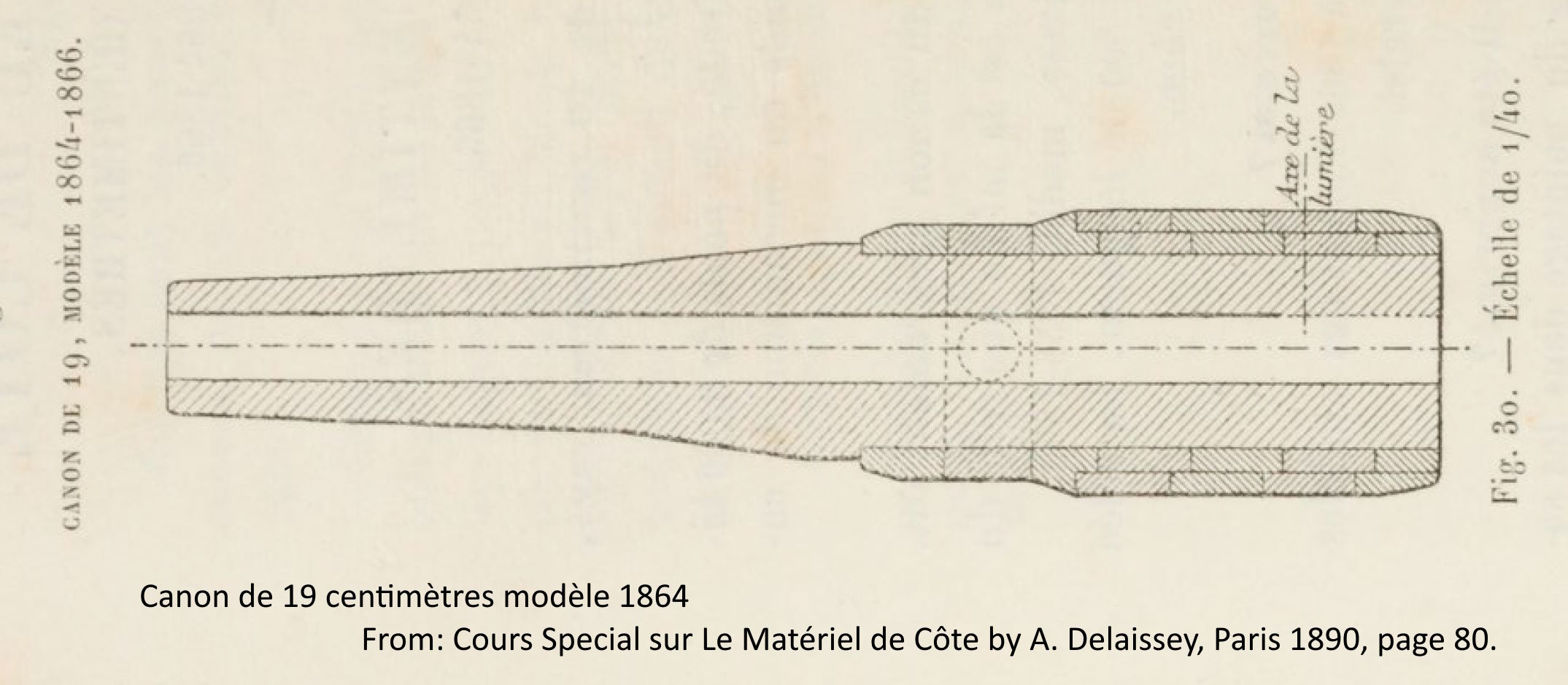
- Drawing of the gun published in 1890
- Type: Naval artillery
- Place of origin: France

Service history
- In service: 1866
- Used by: France
- Wars: Franco-Prussian War

Production history
- Designed: 1864
- Manufacturer: Ruelle Foundry
- Produced: 1865

Specifications
- Mass: 8,000 kg
- Length: 3.8 m (12 ft) L/19.6
- Barrel length: 3.506 m (11.50 ft) L/18 (bore)
- Shell: Separate-loading, bagged charge and projectiles
- Caliber: 194 mm (7.6 in)
- Breech: screw
- Elevation: c. 20° upper deck carriage; c. 11° gun deck carriage; c. coastal carriage
- Muzzle velocity: 356 m/s (1,170 ft/s) regular; 344 m/s (1,130 ft/s) armor-piercing
- Effective firing range: 800 m (0.50 mi) A-P at 1.47° 7,000 m (4.3 mi) Grenade at 35°

The Canon de 19 C modèle 1864 was a 194 mm cast iron rifled breech loader built-up gun used by the French Navy, as coastal artillery, and also in land warfare.

== Context ==
The first series of rifled guns made for the French Navy was known as 'Modèle 1858-60'. It came shortly after the 1855 Battle of Kinburn and consisted of seven hooped / ringed guns in the calibers 14, 16, and 22 cm. All but one of these were rifled muzzle loaders. The 14 cm pieces were basically changed 18-pounders. The 16 cm guns were transformed 30-pounders, except for the breech-loading one. The 22 cm gun was a transformed shell gun.

The relation between the old smoothbore cannon, designated by the weight of their solid shot in pounds, and the new rifled guns designated by their caliber in centimeters, was straightforward: 14 cm guns had a caliber of 138.7 mm and were made by changing 18-pounders; 16 cm guns had a caliber of 164.7 mm and came about by changing 30-pounders. The 22 cm shell gun weighed only about the same as the heavy 36-pounder (174.8 mm) guns. It therefore did not show the same relation between smoothbore and rifled calibers.

A new series of rifled guns called 'modèle 1864', later 'modèle 1864-1866' was designed after the 1862 Battle of Hampton Roads. This battle made it clear that the existing 14 and 16 cm guns were not strong enough to effectively penetrate armored ships. Compared to the previous series, the modèle 1864 system raised the weight of the projectiles from about twice to about thrice the weight of the solid round bullet. The charge was increased to about one-sixth of the weight of the projectile. The modèle 1864 system also introduced three new calibers: our 'Canon de 19 C modèle 1864', the Canon de 24 C modèle 1864 and the Canon de 27 C modèle 1864.

The caliber of 194 mm for our 19 cm gun seems strange. However, in 1849 a smoothbore 50-pounder muzzleloading gun had been introduced in the French Navy. This 50-pounder gun had a caliber of 194 mm, but with a length of bore of 3,094 mm and a weight of 4,710 kg, it was much smaller. The 50-pounder gun might explain the 194 mm caliber of the Canon de 19 C modèle 1864. When the model 1864 guns were introduced, the 19 cm gun was said to also be able to fire a round bullet of 25 kg. This would be practical if it was the same bullet that the 50-pounder fired.

== Development ==
The first designs of the Canon de 19 C modèle 1864 date from October and December 1864. The designs changed many times. There were e.g. guns with a single and (multiple arrangements of) double layers of rings. Other changes were internal, e.g. to the breech, the obturator(s) and the grooving.

== The Canon de 19 C modèle 1864 T 1870 ==
The Canon de 19 C modèle 1864 T 1870 was a 19 cm model 1864 gun changed to be like the Canon de 19 C modèle 1870. The primary reason for this change was the invention of slower burning gunpowders. These made it possible to use a higher charge without increasing the peak pressure, but while still yielding a useful high pressure over a longer period of time. The changes consisted of inserting a steel inner tube into the gun and increasing the size of the powder chamber. The new inner tube got the same rifling as the model 1870 gun.

== Characteristics ==
=== Barrel ===
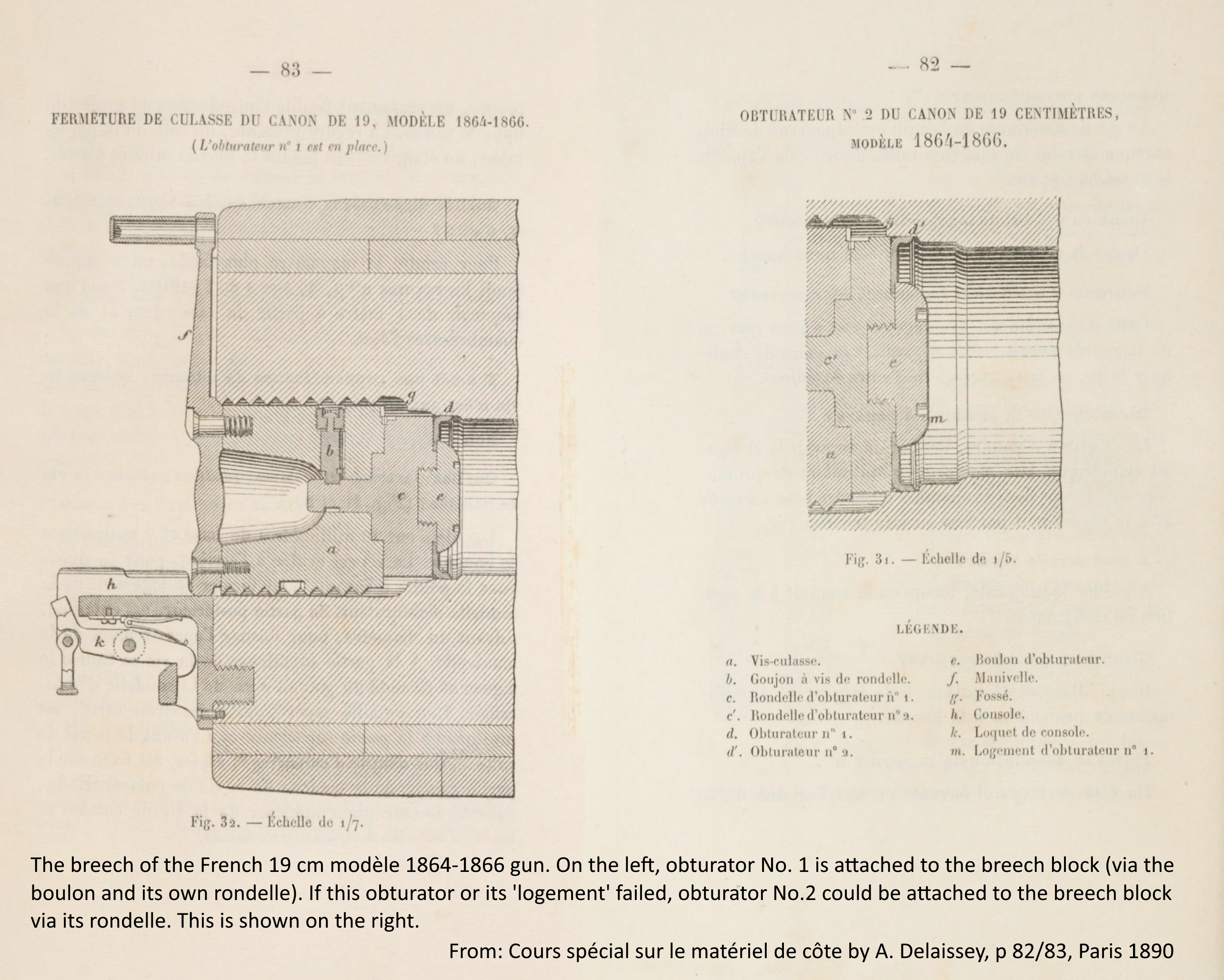
Breech section with the two obturators

The total length of the barrel was 3,800 mm or L/19.6. Its weight was 8,000 kg. The core of the cast iron barrel was reinforced by shrinking on hoops or rings, which pressed the cast iron closer together, making it more resistant to shock. Multiple systems of ringing the gun were tried out. The first system consisted of a single layer of rings. Later on three different systems with a double layer of rings were introduced and put into service. The final model had seven rings in the first layer and four in the second layer.

The length of bore of the barrel was 3,506 mm. The main part of the barrel was 2,980 mm long and had a diameter of 194 mm. Behind the main barrel, there was a transitional cone that led to the powder chamber. The powder chamber had a diameter of 205 mm. According to its final design, it was 506.5 mm long.

The obturator came right behind the powder chamber. It served to prevent the escape of gasses to the rear. It was a ring placed in a tronconic area that ranged from 214 to 216 mm diameter. Later on a second area was made that could be used in case the first became unserviceable. This second area had a diameter ranging from 225 to 228 mm.

The breech was a screw breech. It was inserted into an area that was 219.5 mm long and had a diameter of 252 mm.

The rifling consisted of five grooves. At the muzzle these were 41.5 mm wide and had a maximum depth of 4 mm. Groove number 1 differed from the others, because it also served to guide the projectile to its proper position, the studs being in the grooves before firing the gun. For this purpose it was connected to a channel (rigole) that started outside the chamber.

=== Projectiles ===
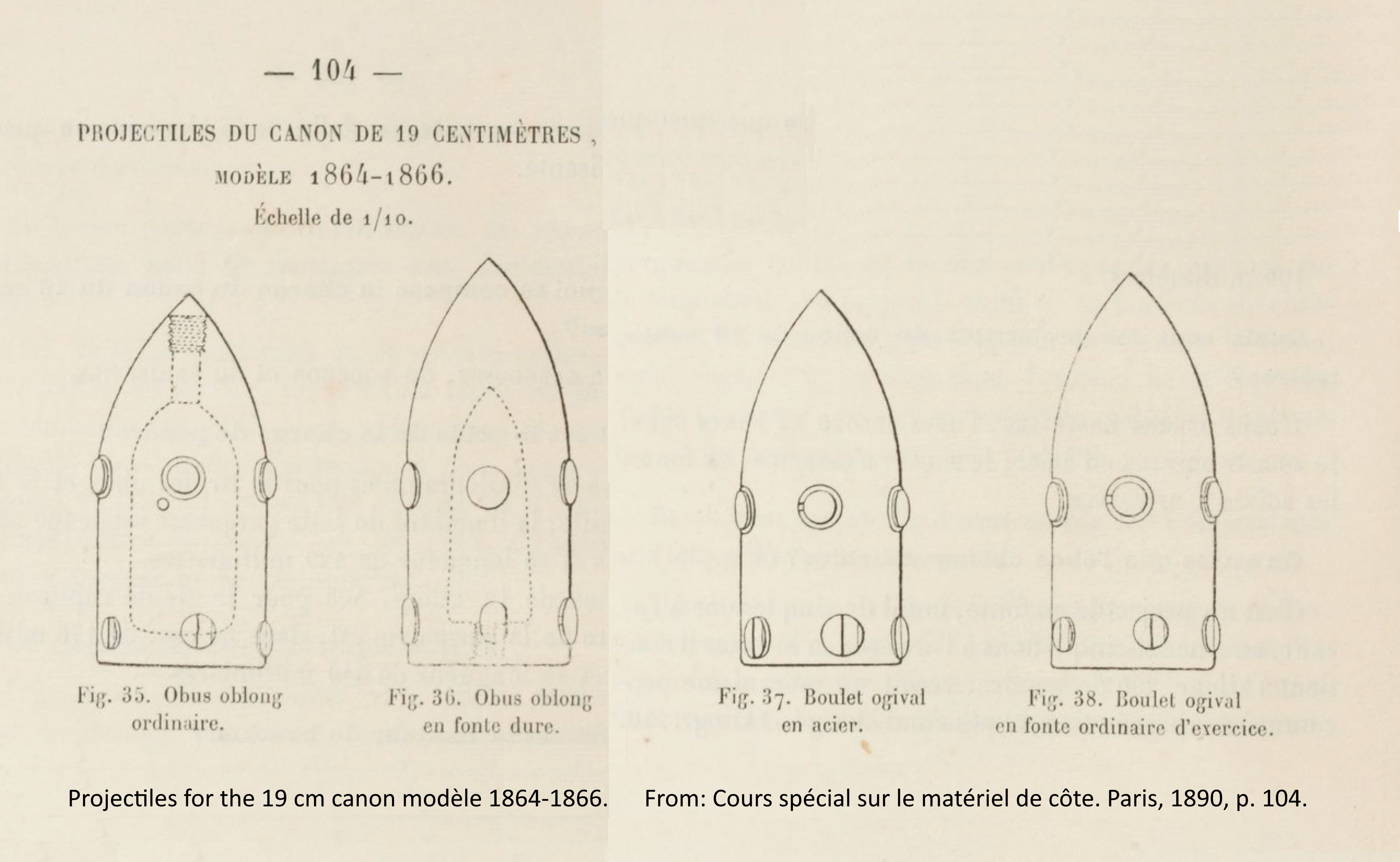
Projectiles for the 19 cm model 1864-1866 gun

The regular grenade of the 19 cm gun was an ogive cast iron grenade called obus oblong. At its head, a percussion fuze was mounted before firing. The front studs (these went into the grooves) were made from zinc. The studs at the rear were made of monetary bronze. This projectile weighed 52.25 kg and held 2.2 kg of explosives. The obus oblong of chilled cast iron was also a grenade. It weighed 75 kg and had an internal explosive charge of 1 kg. It did not have a fuze, but relied on the heat of the impact to ignite the charge. See the image to the right, showing the internal lines of these grenades.

The first steel shot was called 'Boulet ogival de 19 cent. en acier'. It was a good option for penetrating armor and weighed 75 kg. The 'Boulet ogival de 19 c/m en fonte dure' was the chilled cast iron equivalent of the same weight. It was slightly longer than the steel shot to get to the same weight. The 'Boulet ogival de 19 c/m en fonte ordinaire' was a cast iron shot for exercises. It was like the steel and chilled cast iron shot, but still longer, to get the same weight. All these shot did not have an internal charge.

For use on the shortest distances, there was less pointy cylindrical shot. There was a steel cylindrical projectiles for the most dire circumstances. To exercise with them, there was a cast iron cylindrical shot of the same weight, but again a bit longer to compensate for the density of iron instead of steel.

The set of projectiles was completed by three different kinds of canister shot. The longest projectiles were 380 mm long. This was almost L/2.

The Canon de 19 C modèle 1864 T 1870 used the same projectiles as the model 1870 gun.

=== Performance ===
With a charge of 8 kg, the regular grenade of 52.5 kg attained a velocity of 356 m/s. As the regular grenade relied on its explosion to cause damage, its range and accuracy were most important. On e.g. the battery carriage M 1867, it could be elevated to 12° and attain a range of about 3,900 m. Mounted on an upper deck carriage, it could attain a range of 7,000 m if it could be elevated to 35°.

With a charge of 12.5 kg, the ogive massive armor-piercing shot of 75 kg attained a velocity of 344 m/s. The ballistic table for this projectile went up to 800 m, which can be taken as the maximum effective range of the A-P shot.

The Canon de 19 C modèle 1864 T 1870 used the model 1870 projectiles and higher charges. For the regular grenade, this was 20 kg, for the ogive A-P projectile it was 21 kg, and for the exercise grenade it was 12 kg.

=== On board carriages ===
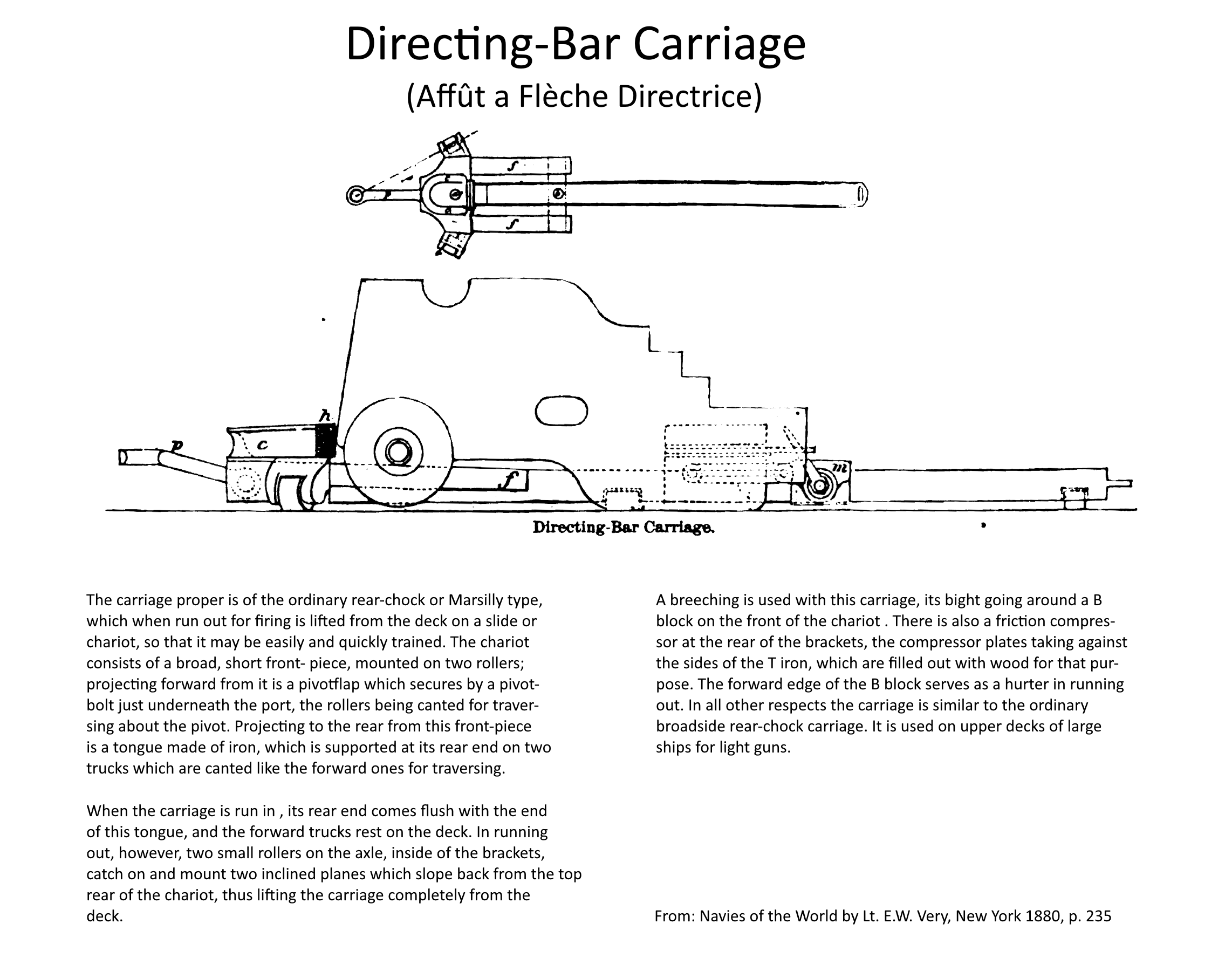
Directing-Bar carriage

For use on the upper deck, there were three models of a directing bar carriage (affût à flèche directrice). These were named for a bar (flèche) that traversed on a pivot near the hull in front of the gun. In firing position, this lifted the upper carriage off the deck, making it easier to aim the gun horizontally. The first carriage was made of wood, later ones of iron. However, this type of carriage soon proved inconvenient for guns that were as heavy as the 19 cm M 1864 and 1870, and so these carriages were abandoned. The last model of these carriages could elevate the gun to 20°, decline it to 5° and weighed 2,835 kg.

The second type of carriage were the affûts de batterie à châssis. As the name implies, these were meant to be used on the covered gun deck of ironclads. These carriages consisted of an upper carriage (very much like a traditional naval carriage) that recoiled back over a frame called slide. Carriage and slide were built to create a lot of friction. A compressor brake connected to both would catch the rest of the movement.

The battery carriage M 1864 had a wooden upper carriage and a wooden slide. It weighed 3,170 kg. All M1864s were later changed to an use an iron slide, together with other modifications for using the carriages on floating batteries. Some of the M 1864s escaped these changes and were instead changed to be used on a turntable for small vessels.

The battery carriage M 1866 carriage had a cast iron slide from the start, but retained the wooden upper carriage. In 1868 all of these, like the M 1864 carriages would be changed to be used on floating batteries. After these changes, it could elevate the gun to 19° (16° for the M 1864).

The battery carriage M 1867 was the third model for use on the battery deck. It could elevate the gun to 12° and incline it to 9.3° and weighed 3,760 kg. A fifth carriage was named 'système Dard' and was especially built for floating batteries.

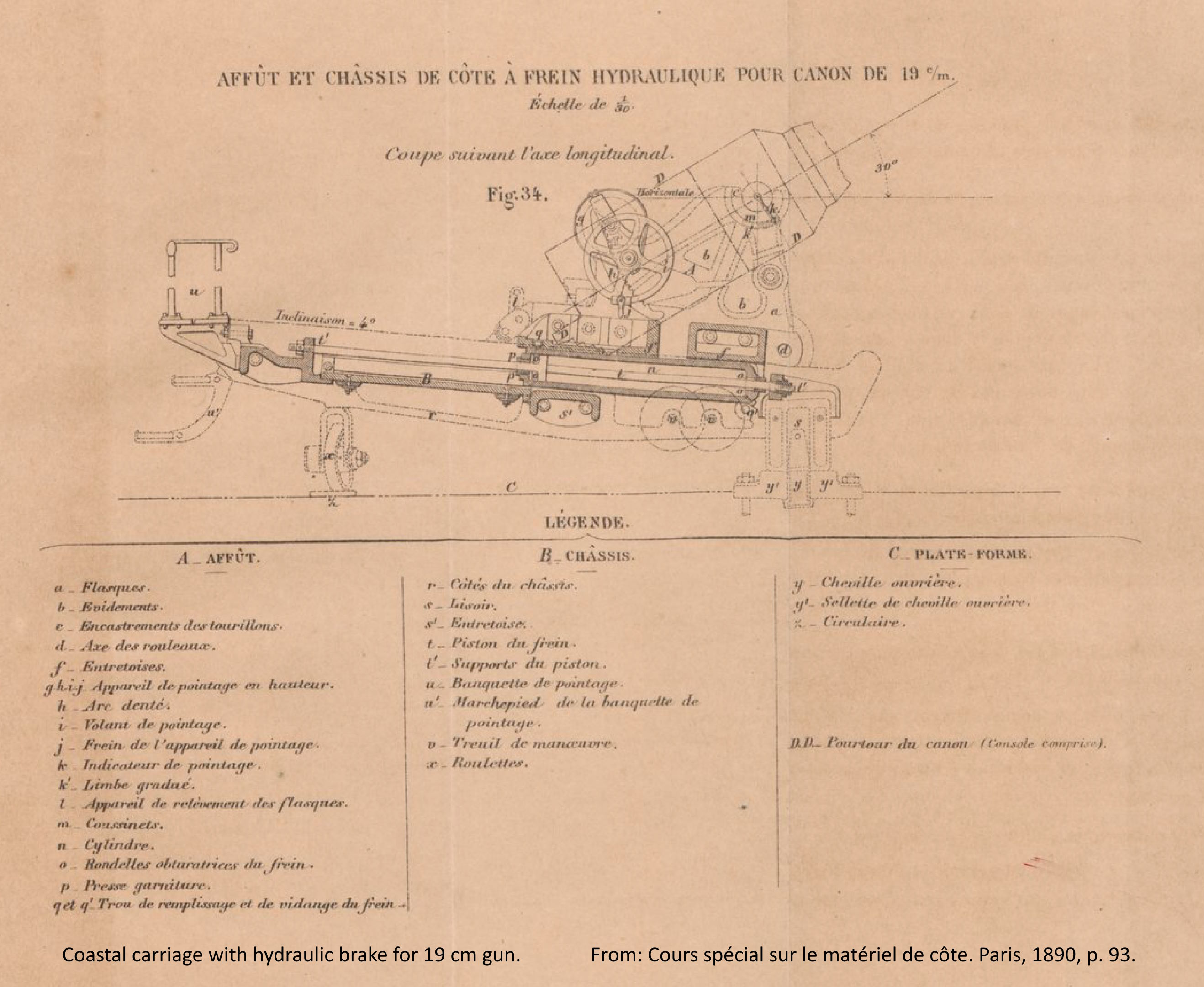
Coastal carriage with hydraulic brake for 19 cm gun

The central pivot carriages (affût à châssis tournant) were meant for fast corvettes which were armed with three 19 cm M 1864 or M 1870 guns or for avisos, in which case the carriage was also called as such. Some of these carriages were changed for use on the Crocodile gunboats. The carriages weighed about 7,358 kg including the rails. They could elevate the gun from -6° to +25°.

The turntable carriages (affûts à plate-forme tournante) were designed for the Alma-class armored corvettes. They had a sheet iron platform that turned on 12 rollers. Upon this platform the slide of the gun was fixed. This carriage weighed 13,623 kg including the platform and the rails. It could elevate the gun from -6° to +30°.

=== Coastal carriages ===
A coastal carriage that turned on a front pivot was the affût de côte à pivot à l'avant pour canons rayés de 19 centimètres. Like the on board carriages, this had an upper carriage, a slide, a pivot, and an inverted semi-circular rails on the ground into which the rollers fit. Below the gun, there was generally a concrete slab of about 50 cm thickness. There were several models. The M 1869 used a compressor brake, while models M 1880, and M 1869M and M 1880M had a hydraulic brake.

There was also a carriage on a central pivot, the M 1878. Opting for a front or a central pivot generally depended on whether the arc of fire required of the gun justified the costlier central pivot carriage.

== Use ==
=== On land ===
The Canon de 19 C modèle 1864 was used extensively in coastal batteries.

The gun was also used during the Siege of Paris (1870–1871). Two pieces were in battery at the fortress of Fort Mont-Valérien. Another piece was the gun called 'La Joséphine', but this was not used during the siege. It was used during the fighting of the Paris Commune. A handful of other pieces was used during the siege.

=== At sea ===
In 1869 the French ironclad Gloire got two Canon de 19 C modèle 1864 as chase guns on the upper deck. In 1876 Couronne got four 19 cm M 1864 guns on affûts à châssis on the upper deck. In 1866 Solférino (and probably Magenta) got 12 19 C modèle 1864 guns on its higher gun deck. These were later removed, but by December 1868 she was to get four 19 C modèle 1864 guns on the upper deck. The Provence-class ironclads would also get four 19 C modèle 1864 guns on the upper deck after re-armament.

The smaller Belliqueuse initially had four 19 C modèle 1864 on affûts de batterie à châssis, but these were later replaced by M 1870 guns. The floating battery Opiniâtre had four 19 C modèle 1864 guns on carriages with wooden frames. The floating battery Implacable initially had the same armament and retained two 19 C modèle 1864 guns when she became a schooling vessel. The floating batteries Embuscade, Protectrice, Refuge, and Imprenable also got four 19 C modèle 1864 guns.
