= Magenta-class ironclad =

French Navy ship class (1862–1882)

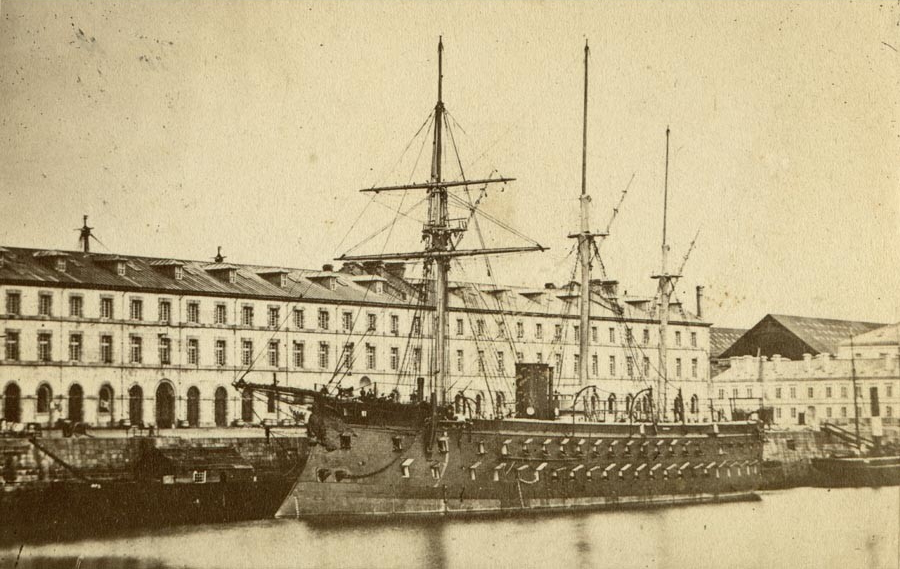
- Solférino in Cherbourg, France, c. 1863–1864

Class overview
- Name: Magenta class
- Builders: Arsenal de Brest; Arsenal de Lorient
- Operators: French Navy
- Preceded by: Couronne
- Succeeded by: Provence class
- Built: 1859–1863
- In commission: 1862–1882
- Completed: 2
- Lost: 1
- Scrapped: 1

General characteristics (as completed)
- Type: Broadside ironclad
- Displacement: 6,796 or 6,965 t (6,689 or 6,855 long tons)
- Length: 85.51 or 88.6 m (280 ft 7 in or 290 ft 8 in)
- Beam: 17.34 m (56 ft 11 in)
- Draft: 8.44 m (27 ft 8 in)
- Installed power: 8 boilers; 4,019 PS (2,956 kW) (trials)
- Propulsion: 1 shaft, 1 horizontal-return connecting rod-steam engine
- Sail plan: Barquentine-rig
- Speed: 12.88 knots (23.85 km/h; 14.82 mph) (trials)
- Range: 1,840 nautical miles (3,410 km; 2,120 mi) at 10 knots (19 km/h; 12 mph)
- Complement: 674
- Armament: 16 × single 194 mm (7.6 in) smoothbore muzzle-loading guns; 34 × single 164.7 mm (6.5 in) rifled muzzle-loading (RML) guns; 2 × 225 mm (8.9 in) RML howitzers
- Armor: Belt: 120 mm (4.7 in); Battery: 109–120 mm (4.3–4.7 in)

The Magenta class consisted of two broadside ironclads built for the French Navy (Marine nationale) in the early 1860s. They were the only ironclad two-deckers ever built, and the first ironclads to feature a naval ram.

== Design and description ==
The Magenta class was designed by naval architect Henri Dupuy de Lôme as a reply to the low height of the Gloire-class ironclad's gun ports which impaired their ability to work their guns in heavy seas. He gave the Magentas an upper spar deck which would allow them to work those guns in all weathers and caused them to be rated as ironclad ships of the line by the French Navy. They were considered to be good seaboats, although they were not very maneuverable.

Magenta was 88.6 meters (290 ft 8 in) long, but her sister ship Solférino was 85.51 m (280 ft 7 in) long. They had a beam of 17.34 meters (56 ft 11 in) and a draft of 8.44 meters (27 ft 8 in). Magenta displaced 6,965 metric tons (6,855 long tons) while Solférino displaced 6,796 t (6,689 long tons). They were equipped with a metal-reinforced, spur-shaped ram. The ironclads had a crew of 674 officers and enlisted men.

The Magenta-class ships had a single two-cylinder horizontal-return connecting-rod compound steam engine that drove the propeller shaft, using steam provided by eight boilers (Note: Sources differ on the number of boilers. Gille and Silverstone state that they had eight, but Campbell says nine.). The engine was rated at 1,000 nominal horsepower or 3,450 metric horsepower (2,540 kW) and was intended to give the ships a speed in excess of 13 knots (24 km/h; 15 mph). During their sea trials, Solférino achieved a speed of 12.88 knots (23.85 km/h; 14.82 mph) from 4,012 metric horsepower (2,951 kW). The Magenta class carried enough coal to allow them to steam for 1,840 nautical miles (3,410 km; 2,120 mi) at a speed of 10 knots (19 km/h; 12 mph). They were originally fitted with a three-masted barquentine rig that had a sail area of 1,711 square meters (18,420 sq ft), but they were re-rigged as barques with 1,960 m^{2} (21,100 sq ft) in 1864–1865.

=== Armament and protection ===
The main battery of the Magenta class consisted of sixteen 194-millimeter (7.6 in) Modèle 1858–60 smoothbore muzzle-loading guns, thirty-four 164.7-millimeter (6.5 in) Modèle 1858–60 rifled muzzle-loading (RML) guns and a pair of 225-millimeter (8.9 in) RML howitzers on two gun decks. All of the 194 mm guns and ten of the 164.7 mm guns were mounted on the lower gun deck on the broadside. The remaining 164.7 mm guns and the 225 mm howitzers were positioned on the upper gun deck; the former on the broadside, but the latter were placed on pivot mounts as chase guns fore and aft. In the late 1860s all of the guns on the lower gun deck were removed and their armament was changed to four 240-millimeter (9.4 in) RMLs and eight 194 mm smoothbores, two each of the latter fore and aft as chase guns on the upper gun deck. Their final armament consisted of ten 240 mm Modèle 1864–66 guns and four 194 mm guns as chase guns fore and aft.

The Magentas had a full-length waterline belt that consisted of wrought-iron plates 120 mm (4.7 in) thick. Above the belt both gun decks were protected with 109 mm (4.3 in) of armor, but the ends of the ships were unprotected.

== Ships ==
Ship	Builder	Laid down	Launched	Commissioned	Fate
Magenta	Arsenal de Brest	22 June 1859	22 June 1861	2 January 1863	Exploded, 31 October 1875
Solférino	Arsenal de Lorient	24 June 1859	24 June 1861	25 August 1862	Condemned, 21 July 1882

== Bibliography ==
- de Balincourt, Captain & Vincent-Bréchignac, Captain (1974). "The French Navy of Yesterday: Ironclad Frigates, Pt. II". F.P.D.S. Newsletter. II (3): 23–25. OCLC 41554533.
- Campbell, N. J. M. (1979). "France". In Chesneau, Roger & Kolesnik, Eugene M. (eds.). Conway's All the World's Fighting Ships 1860–1905. Greenwich, UK: Conway Maritime Press. pp. 282–333. ISBN 0-8317-0302-4.
- Gille, Eric (1999). Cent ans de cuirassés français [A Century of French Battleships] (in French). Nantes: Marines. ISBN 2-909-675-50-5.
- Jones, Colin (1996). "Entente Cordiale, 1865". In McLean, David & Preston, Antony (eds.). Warship 1996. London: Conway Maritime Press. ISBN 0-85177-685-X.
- Konstam, Angus (2019). European Ironclads 1860–75: The Gloire Sparks the Great Ironclad Arms Race. Oxford, UK: Osprey Publishing. ISBN 978-1-47282-676-3.
- Roberts, Stephen S. (2021). French Warships in the Age of Steam 1859–1914: Design, Construction, Careers and Fates. Barnsley, UK: Seaforth Publishing. ISBN 978-1-5267-4533-0.
- Silverstone, Paul H. (1984). Directory of the World's Capital Ships. New York: Hippocrene Books. ISBN 0-88254-979-0.
- Wilson, H. W. (1896). Ironclads in Action: A Sketch of Naval Warfare From 1855 to 1895, with Some Account of the Development of the Battleship in England. Vol. 1. Boston: Little, Brown. OCLC 902936108.
- Winfield, Rif & Roberts, Stephen S. (2015). French Warships in the Age of Sail, 1786–1861. Barnsley, UK: Seaforth Publishing. ISBN 978-1-84832-204-2.
