= French ironclad Couronne =

French Navy's armoured frigate

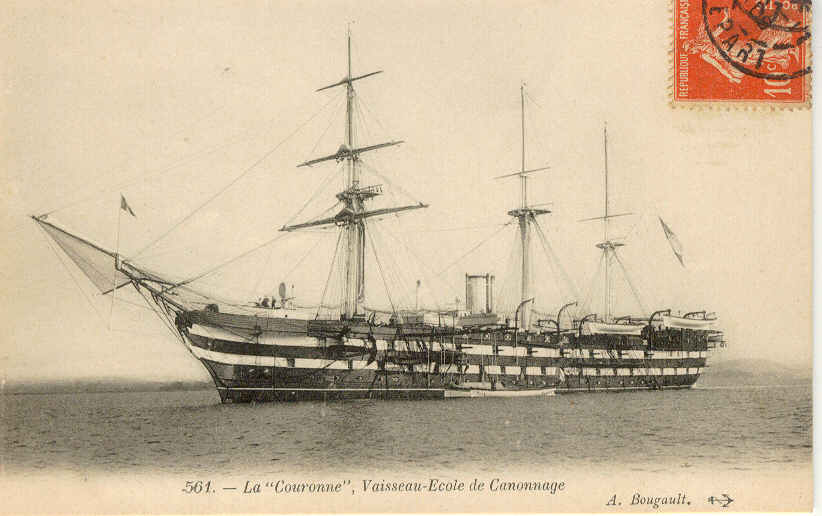
- Postcard of Couronne at anchor

Class overview
- Operators: French Navy
- Preceded by: Gloire class
- Succeeded by: Magenta class
- Built: 1859–1862
- In service: 1862–1931
- In commission: 1862–1908
- Completed: 1
- Scrapped: 1

History
- Name: Couronne
- Namesake: Crown of Napoleon III
- Ordered: 4 March 1858
- Builder: Arsenal de Lorient
- Cost: 6,018,885 francs
- Laid down: 14 February 1859
- Launched: 28 March 1861
- Commissioned: 2 February 1862
- Out of service: Hulked, 1 September 1909
- Reclassified: As gunnery training ship, 1885
- Fate: Scrapped, 1934

General characteristics (as completed)
- Type: Armoured frigate
- Displacement: 6,428 t (6,326 long tons)
- Length: 80.85 m (265 ft 3 in)
- Beam: 16.7 m (54 ft 9 in)
- Draught: 7.8 m (25 ft 7 in)
- Depth of hold: 9.7 m (31 ft 10 in)
- Installed power: 8 oval boilers; 2,597 PS (1,910 kW)
- Propulsion: 1 × shaft; 1 × HRCR-steam engine
- Sail plan: Barquentine rigged
- Speed: 12.5 knots (23.2 km/h; 14.4 mph)
- Range: 2,410 nautical miles (4,460 km; 2,770 mi) at 10 knots (19 km/h; 12 mph)
- Complement: 570
- Armament: 30 × 164.7 mm (6.5 in) rifled breech-loading guns
- Armour: Hull: 120 mm (4.7 in); Conning tower: 100 mm (3.9 in); Deck: 12.7 mm (0.5 in)

The French ironclad Couronne ("Crown") was the first iron-hulled ironclad warship built for the French Navy in 1859–1862. She was the first such ship to be laid down, although the British armoured frigate HMS Warrior was completed first. The ship participated in the Franco-Prussian War of 1870–1871, but saw no combat. She was served as a gunnery training ship from 1885 to 1908 before she was hulked the following year and became a barracks ship in Toulon. Couronne was scrapped in 1934, over 70 years after she was completed.

== Design and description ==
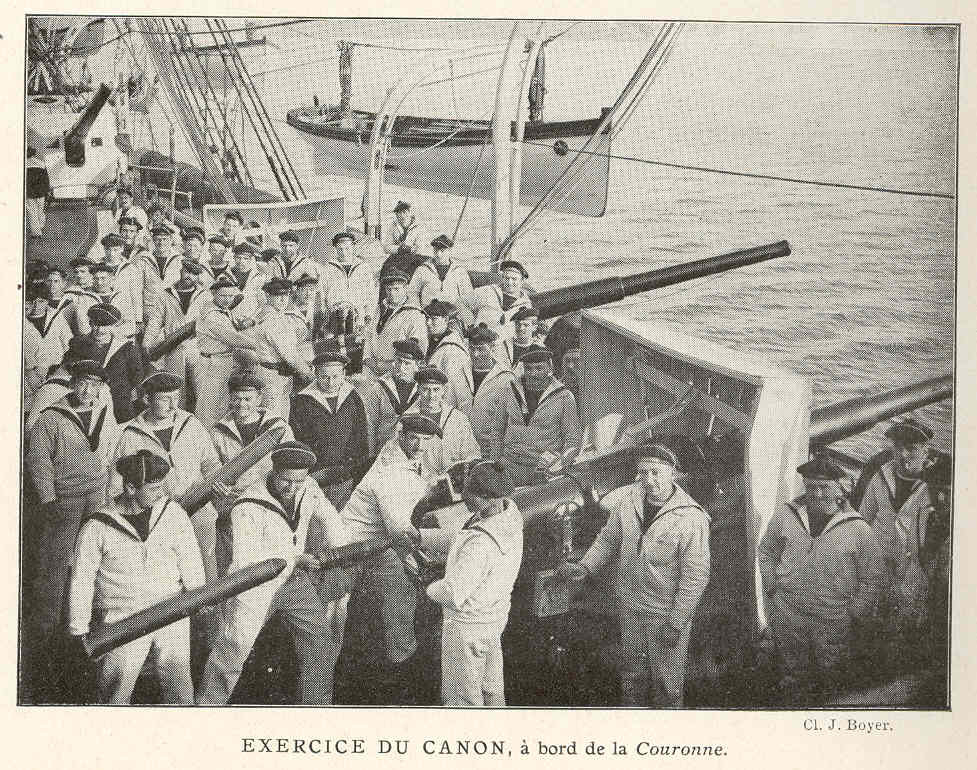
Gunnery practice on Couronne

Designed by the French naval architect Camille Audenet as an iron-hulled armoured frigate of similar type to the Gloire-class ironclads, although strictly not a sister ship but a unique vessel, Couronne was also intended to fight in the line of battle, unlike the first British ironclads. The ship was classified as an armoured frigate because she only had a single gun deck and her traditional disposition of guns arrayed along the length of the hull also meant that she was a broadside ironclad. The ship was 80.85 metres (265 ft 3 in) long, with a beam of 17 metres (55 ft 9 in). She had a maximum draft of 7.8 metres (25 ft 7 in), a depth of hold of 9.7 metres (31 ft 10 in) and displaced 6,428 tonnes (6,326 long tons). The ship's metacentric height of 1.8 metres (6 ft) meant that she rolled less and was a better sea boat than the Gloires. Her gun ports were slightly higher above the waterline than those of her predecessors, 2 metres (6 ft 7 in), and Couronne took aboard less water as well. She had a crew of 570 officers and enlisted men.

The ship had a single horizontal return connecting-rod compound steam engine that drove a six-bladed, 5.8-meter (19 ft 0 in) propeller using steam provided by eight Indret oval boilers for a designed speed of 12.5 knots (23.2 km/h; 14.4 mph). Figures for the engine's designed power vary wildly, from 2,000 to 3,200 indicated horsepower (1,500 to 2,400 kW), but Couronne reached 13 knots (24 km/h; 15 mph) from 2,597 metric horsepower (1,910 kW) during her sea trials. She carried a maximum of 675 tonnes (664 long tons) of coal which allowed her to steam for 2,410 nautical miles (4,460 km; 2,770 mi) at a speed of 10 knots (19 km/h; 12 mph). The details of Couronne's sailing rig are not precisely known, although a photograph of her in her original single-decker ironclad guise quite clearly shows her with full ship rig (square rig on three masts), but presumably she was fitted with a light barquentine rig with three masts like that of the Gloire-class ships. It is also unknown if she had the same multiple changes of rigging as those ships.

Couronne was armed with 36 Modèle 1860 164.7-millimetre (6.5 in) rifled breech-loading guns, 30 of which were positioned on the single gun deck in the broadside. The remaining 4 guns were placed on the upper deck as chase guns. They fired a 44.9-kilogram (99.0 lb) shell at a muzzle velocity of only 322 metres per second (1,060 ft/s) and proved to be ineffective against armour. The ship was rearmed multiple times during her career, the first of which was the replacement of the chase guns by four 220-millimetre (8.7 in) howitzers in 1864 and the replacement of the rest of the guns by improved Modèle 1864 guns. The ship was subsequently rearmed with 16 Canon de 19 C modèle 1864 (with a caliber of 194-millimetre (7.6 in)) on her main deck and six 164.7-millimetre guns on the upper deck as chase guns. Her final armament configuration before she became a gunnery training ship in 1881 was eight Canon de 24 C modèle 1870 (9.4 in) guns and four 194-millimetre Modèle 1870 guns on the main deck. A pair of 120-millimetre (4.7 in) guns and a dozen 37-millimetre (1.5 in) 5-barrelled Hotchkiss revolving cannon were mounted on the upper deck.

Couronne's wrought iron hull was completely protected by armour plates 120 millimetres thick. The armour backing consisted of two layers of teak, totaling 380 millimetres (15 in) in thickness, an iron lattice work 33 millimetres (1.3 in) thick, and the 20-millimetre (0.79 in) side of the hull. The ship had a conning tower with armour 100 millimetres (3.9 in) thick and 12.7 millimetres (0.5 in) of armour underneath the wooden upper deck.

== Construction and service ==
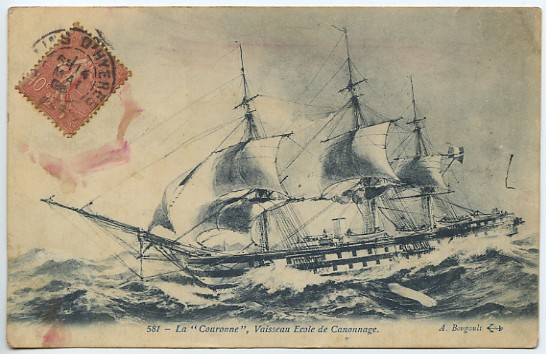
A lithograph postcard of Couronne sailing in heavy seas

Ordered on 4 March 1858, Couronne was laid down at the Arsenal de Lorient on 14 February 1859, launched on 28 March 1861 and commissioned on 2 February 1862 at a cost of 6,018,885 francs. On 19 June 1864, Couronne played an incidental role in the Battle of Cherbourg as she escorted the Confederate commerce raider CSS Alabama out of French territorial waters to her fight with USS Kearsarge. While assigned to the Mediterranean Fleet, the ship made a port visit in August 1865 to Brest where the fleet hosted the British Channel Fleet. A few days later the French fleet made a reciprocal visit to Portsmouth where it was hosted by the Channel Fleet. On 1 March 1867, Couronne was driven ashore in the Îles d'Hyères, Var in a storm. Several people died.

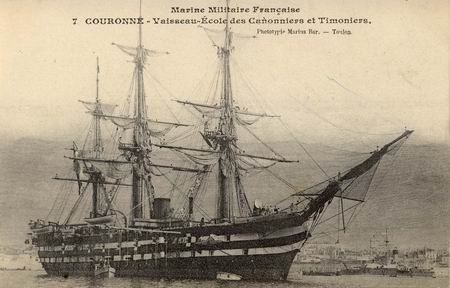
Portrait of Couronne as a gunnery training ship.

During the Franco-Prussian War the ship was assigned to Vice Admiral Léon Martin Fourichon's squadron that blockaded German ports in the Heligoland Bight in August and September 1870. The four German ironclads at Wilhelmshaven sortied in search of the French squadron in early August before the French arrived and in mid-September after the French were forced to abandon the blockade for lack of coal.

Couronne returned to Toulon on 10 December. In 1876, she was assigned to the Mediterranean Squadron. From 1881 to 1885, Couronne was reconstructed to serve as a gunnery training ship, replacing Souverain: her armour was replaced by wood of the same thickness, two boilers were removed and her propeller was replaced. Her rigging was replaced by a full ship rig and iron spar deck and poop decks were fitted which gave her the appearance of a steam ship of the line of the Napoléon type. The ship was rearmed with an assortment of guns of various calibres for training purposes, replacing Souverain in this role. Her crew and trainees numbered 1200 officers and enlisted men. Couronne was replaced as a gunnery training ship on 1 December 1908 and disarmed on 1 September 1909. She was subsequently converted to a floating barracks at Toulon until she was scrapped in 1934.

== Bibliography ==
- de Balincourt, Captain; Vincent-Bréchignac, Captain (1974). "The French Navy of Yesterday: Ironclad Frigates, Part I". F.P.D.S. Newsletter. II (2): 12–15, 18. OCLC 41554533.
- de Balincourt, Captain; Vincent-Bréchignac, Captain (1974). "The French Navy of Yesterday: Ironclad Frigates, Pt. II". II (3): 23–25. OCLC 41554533.
- Campbell, N. J. M. (1979). "France". In Chesneau, Roger & Kolesnik, Eugene M. (eds.). Conway's All the World's Fighting Ships 1860–1905. Greenwich: Conway Maritime Press. pp. 283–333. ISBN 0-8317-0302-4.
- Gardiner, Robert, ed. (1992). Steam, Steel and Shellfire: The Steam Warship 1815–1905. Conway's History of the Ship. London: Conway Maritime Press. ISBN 1-55750-774-0.
- Gille, Eric (1999). Cent ans de cuirassés français [A Century of French Battleships] (in French). Nantes: Marines. ISBN 2-909-675-50-5.
- Jones, Colin (1996). "Entente Cordiale, 1865". In McLean, David & Preston, Antony (eds.). Warship 1996. London: Conway Maritime Press. ISBN 0-85177-685-X.
- Luraghi, Raimondo (1996). A History of the Confederate Navy. Annapolis, Maryland: Naval Institute Press. ISBN 1-55750-527-6.
- Roberts, Stephen S. (2021). French Warships in the Age of Steam 1859–1914: Design, Construction, Careers and Fates. Barnsley, UK: Seaforth Publishing. ISBN 978-1-5267-4533-0.
- Silverstone, Paul H. (1984). Directory of the World's Capital Ships. New York: Hippocrene Books. ISBN 0-88254-979-0.
- Sondhaus, Lawrence (2001). Naval Warfare, 1815–1914. London: Routledge. ISBN 978-0-415-21478-0.
- Wilson, H. W. (1896). Ironclads in Action: A Sketch of Naval Warfare From 1855 to 1895. Vol. 1 and 2. Boston: Little, Brown.
