= Gloire-class ironclad =

Group of ships

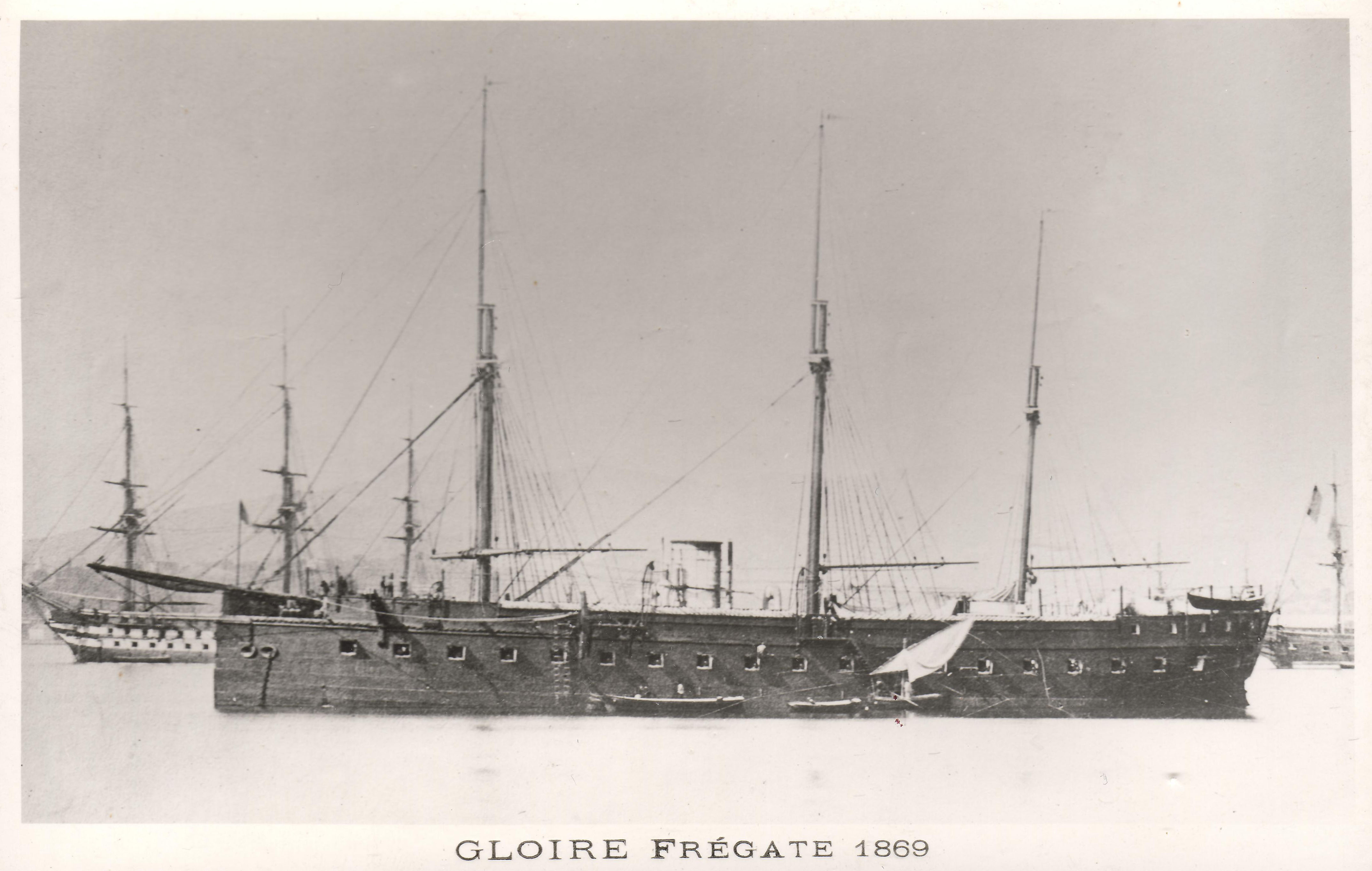
- Gloire at anchor, 1869

Class overview
- Name: Gloire class
- Builders: Arsenal de Toulon (2); Arsenal de Cherbourg (1)
- Operators: French Navy
- Preceded by: None
- Succeeded by: Couronne
- Built: 1858–1862
- In service: 1860–1879
- In commission: 1860–1879
- Completed: 3
- Scrapped: 3

General characteristics (as completed)
- Type: Armored frigate
- Displacement: 5,618–5,650 t (5,529–5,561 long tons)
- Length: 77.25–78.22 m (253 ft 5 in – 256 ft 8 in)
- Beam: 17 m (55 ft 9 in)
- Draft: 8.48 m (27 ft 10 in)
- Depth of hold: 10.67 m (35 ft 0 in)
- Installed power: 2,500 ihp (1,900 kW); 8 oval boilers
- Propulsion: 1 shaft, 1 HRCR-steam engine
- Sail plan: Barquentine-rigged
- Speed: 13 knots (24 km/h; 15 mph)
- Range: 2,200 nautical miles (4,100 km; 2,500 mi) at 8 knots (15 km/h; 9.2 mph)
- Complement: 570
- Armament: 36 × single 164 mm (6.5 in) Mle 1858 muzzle-loading guns
- Armor: Belt: 120 mm (4.7 in); Battery: 120 mm (4.7 in); Conning tower: 100 mm (3.9 in)

The Gloire-class ironclads were a group of three wooden-hulled armored frigates built for the French Navy in the late 1850s and early 1860s. Gloire, the lead ship of the class, was the first ocean-going ironclad warship to be built by any country. The ships of the Gloire class were classified as armoured frigates because they only had a single gun deck and their traditional disposition of guns arrayed along the length of the hull also meant that they were broadside ironclads.

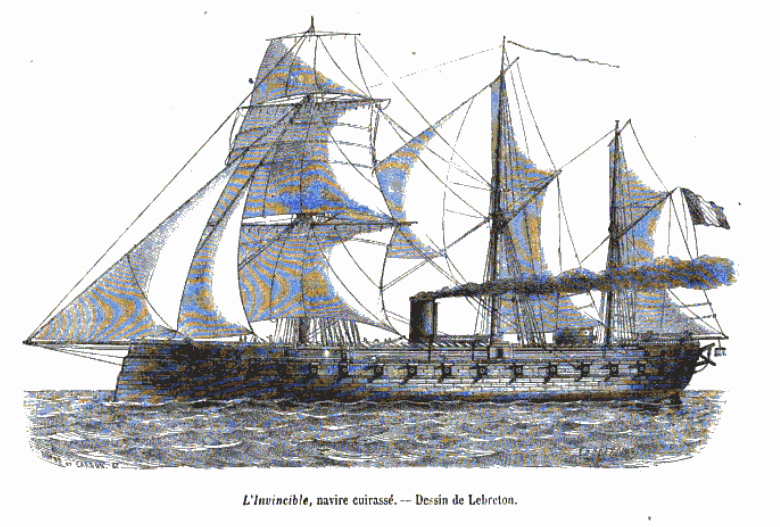
French ironclad Invincible

== Design and description ==
Designed by the French naval architect Henri Dupuy de Lôme, the ships of the class were intended to fight in the line of battle, unlike the first British ironclads. The ships were 77.25–78.22 meters (253 ft 5 in – 256 ft 8 in) long, with a beam of 17 meters (55 ft 9 in). They had a maximum draft of 8.48 meters (27 ft 10 in), a depth of hold of 10.67 meters (35 ft 0 in) and displaced 5,618–5,650 metric tons (5,529–5,561 long tons). The ships of the class had a high metacentric height of 2.1 meters (7 ft) and consequently rolled badly. With their gun ports only 1.88 meters (6 ft 2 in) above the waterline, they proved to be very wet. They had a crew of 570 officers and enlisted men.

The ships of the Gloire class had a single horizontal return connecting-rod compound steam engine that drove a six-bladed, 5.8-meter (19 ft 0 in) propeller. The engine was powered by eight Indret oval boilers and was designed for a capacity of 2,500 indicated horsepower (1,900 kW). On sea trials, the ships exceeded 13 knots (24 km/h; 15 mph). They carried a maximum of 675 metric tons (664 long tons) of coal which allowed them to steam for 4,000 kilometers (2,500 mi) at a speed of 8 knots (15 km/h; 9.2 mph). The Gloire-class ships were initially fitted with a light barquentine rig with three masts that had a sail area around 1,100 square metres (11,800 sq ft). This was later changed to a full ship rig of 2,500 square meters (27,000 sq ft), but later had to be reduced because of excessive rolling.

The ships were initially armed with 36 Modèle 1858 164.7-millimeter (6.5 in) rifled muzzle-loading guns, 34（14 each sides and 2 pivot mounts fore and 4 pivot mounts aft as chase guns）of which were positioned on the single gun deck in the broadside. The remaining two guns were placed on the upper deck as chase guns. They fired a 44.9-kilogram (99.0 lb) shell at a muzzle velocity of only 322 meters per second (1,060 ft/s) and proved to be ineffective against armour. They were replaced by rifled breech-loading Modèle 1864 guns in 1868. Six Canon de 24 C modèle 1864 guns were mounted in the middle of the gun deck and on the upper deck two 194-millimeter (7.6 in) guns replaced the original chase guns.

The wooden hull was completely armoured with wrought iron plates 120 millimeters (4.7 in) thick. Backed by the 760-millimeter (30 in) sides of the hull, the armour extended 5.4 meters (17 ft 9 in) above the waterline and 2.0 meters (6 ft 7 in) below. The Gloire-class ships had an open-topped conning tower with armour 100 millimeters (3.9 in) thick and 10 millimeters (0.4 in) of armour underneath the wooden upper deck.

== Ships ==
Ship	Builder	Laid down	Launched	Completed
Gloire	Arsenal de Toulon	4 March 1858	24 November 1859	August 1860
Invincible	Arsenal de Toulon	1 May 1858	4 April 1861	March 1862
Normandie	Arsenal de Cherbourg	14 September 1858	10 March 1860	13 May 1862

== Service ==
All three ships of the class had very uneventful careers, spending the bulk of their time with the Mediterranean Fleet aside from a few excursions to foreign waters. Normandie supported the French intervention in Mexico in 1862, the first ironclad to cross the Atlantic. They were active during the Franco-Prussian War, but saw no action. Gloire, the only ship built with seasoned timber lasted the longest, not being condemned and broken up until 1879. Her sister ships only lasted a decade in service before they were too rotten for any further use and were condemned in 1871–1872 and subsequently broken up.

== Bibliography ==
- de Balincourt, Captain & Vincent-Bréchignac, Captain (1974). "The French Navy of Yesterday: Ironclad Frigates, Part I". F.P.D.S. Newsletter. II (2): 12–15, 18. OCLC 41554533.
- de Balincourt, Captain & Vincent-Bréchignac, Captain (1974). "The French Navy of Yesterday: Ironclad Frigates, Pt. II". F.P.D.S. Newsletter. II (3): 23–25. OCLC 41554533.
- Campbell, N. J. M. (1979). "France". In Chesneau, Roger & Kolesnik, Eugene M. (eds.). Conway's All the World's Fighting Ships 1860–1905. Greenwich: Conway Maritime Press. pp. 283–333. ISBN 0-8317-0302-4.
- Gardiner, Robert, ed. (1992). Steam, Steel and Shellfire: The Steam Warship 1815–1905. Conway's History of the Ship. London: Conway Maritime Press. ISBN 1-55750-774-0.
- Gille, Eric (1999). Cent ans de cuirassés français [A Century of French Battleships] (in French). Nantes: Marines. ISBN 2-909-675-50-5.
- Jones, Colin (1996). "Entente Cordiale, 1865". In McLean, David; Preston, Antony (eds.). Warship 1996. London: Conway Maritime Press. ISBN 0-85177-685-X.
- Roberts, Stephen S. (2021). French Warships in the Age of Steam 1859–1914: Design, Construction, Careers and Fates. Barnsley, UK: Seaforth Publishing. ISBN 978-1-5267-4533-0.
- Silverstone, Paul H. (1984). Directory of the World's Capital Ships. New York: Hippocrene Books. ISBN 0-88254-979-0.
