= Canon de 24 C modèle 1864 =

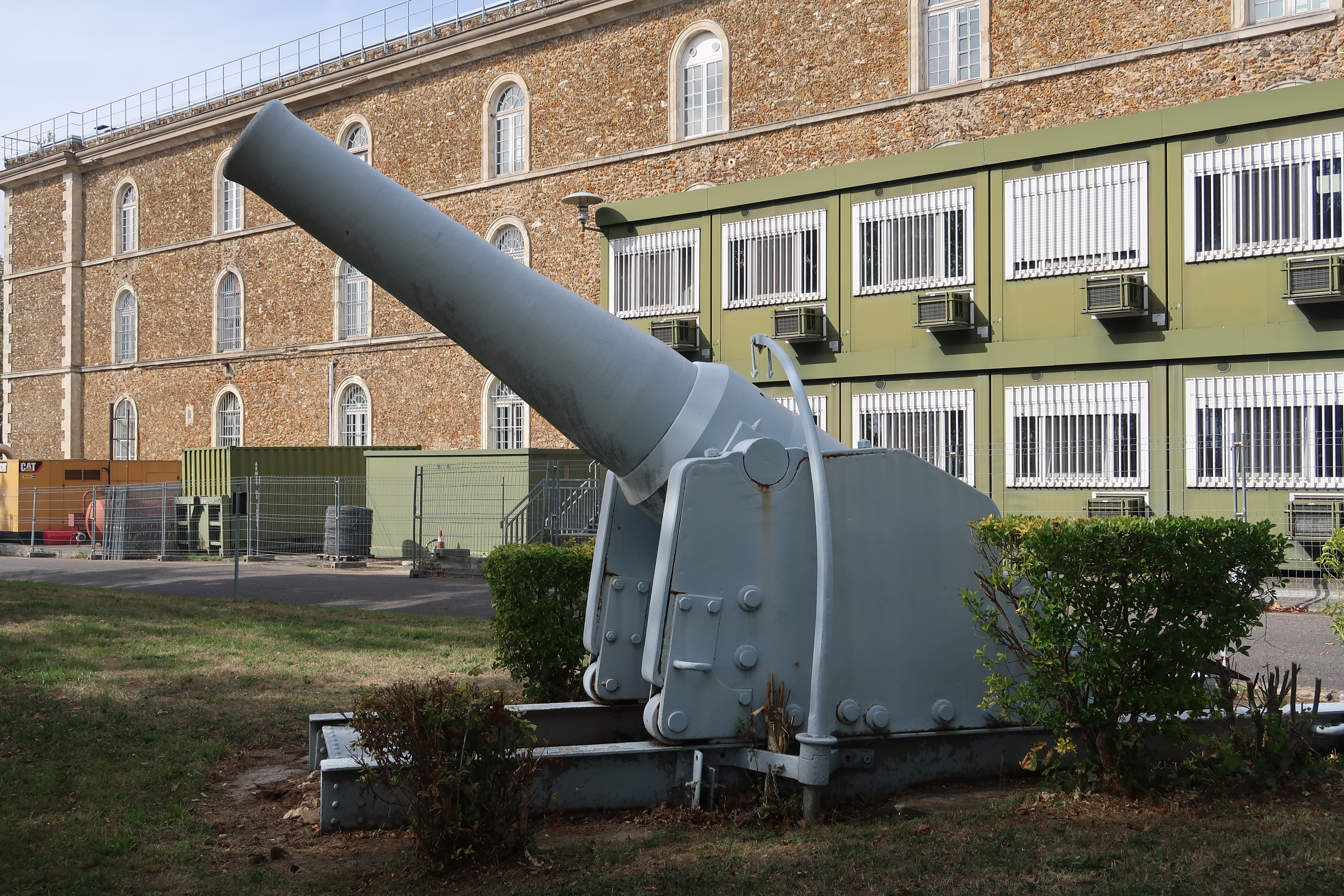
- The 'La Valérie canon' at Fort Mont-Valérien, in Suresnes (Hauts-de-Seine)
- Type: Naval artillery
- Place of origin: France

Service history
- In service: 1864-1940
- Used by: France
- Wars: Franco-Prussian War World War I

Production history
- Designed: 1864
- Manufacturer: Ruelle Foundry
- Produced: 1864

Specifications
- Mass: 14,500 kg
- Length: 4.560 m (14.96 ft) L/19
- Barrel length: 4.197 m (13.77 ft) L/17.5 (bore)
- Shell: Separate-loading, bagged charge and projectiles
- Caliber: 240 mm (9.4 in)
- Breech: screw
- Elevation: c. 11° gun deck carriage; c. 37.5° coastal carriage
- Muzzle velocity: 362 m/s (1,190 ft/s) regular; 480 m/s (1,600 ft/s) T70; 340 m/s (1,100 ft/s) armor-piercing; 480 m/s (1,600 ft/s) T70
- Effective firing range: 1,400 m (0.87 mi) A-P shot 8,000 m (5.0 mi) Grenade

The Canon de 24 C modèle 1864 was a cast iron rifled breech loader built-up gun used by the French Navy and as coastal artillery. The Dutch army used it for coastal defense as '24 cm ijzer'. At least four guns still exist.

== Development ==
The first rifled gun of the French navy was the Canon de 16 cm modèle 1855. It was followed by a series of 7 guns known as the modèle 1858–1860. These were 6 new or modified cannon ranging from 14 to 16 cm caliber and one modified 22 cm shell gun. They were hooped with steel bands and fired a cylindrical projectile of about twice the weight of the round bullet. One of these guns was a breechloader.

During the March 1862 Battle of Hampton Roads, both the Unionist smoothbore 280 mm Dahlgren guns and the Confederate 7 inch Brooke rifles proved unable to effectively deal with armored opponents. The first designs of almost all the French modèle 1864 guns date from October and December 1864.

The family of modèle 1864 guns consisted of guns of five calibers: 14, 16, 19, 24, and 27 cm. Obviously, the first measure to increase the punch, was to increase the caliber. However, the 1864 model also raised the average weight of the shot from two to three times the weight of the round shot. Finally, a third measure was to increase the charge. This way, the heavier shot still attained a higher velocity. As increasing the charge and increasing the weight of the projectile leads to higher peak pressures inside the gun, this can only be done by producing a more resilient barrel.

The first 24 cm modèle 1864 gun was designed in October 1864. However, changes to the design continued to be made right up to January 1868. This probably explains the designation 'modèle 1864-1866' for the family of guns designed in 1864.

=== Early models ===
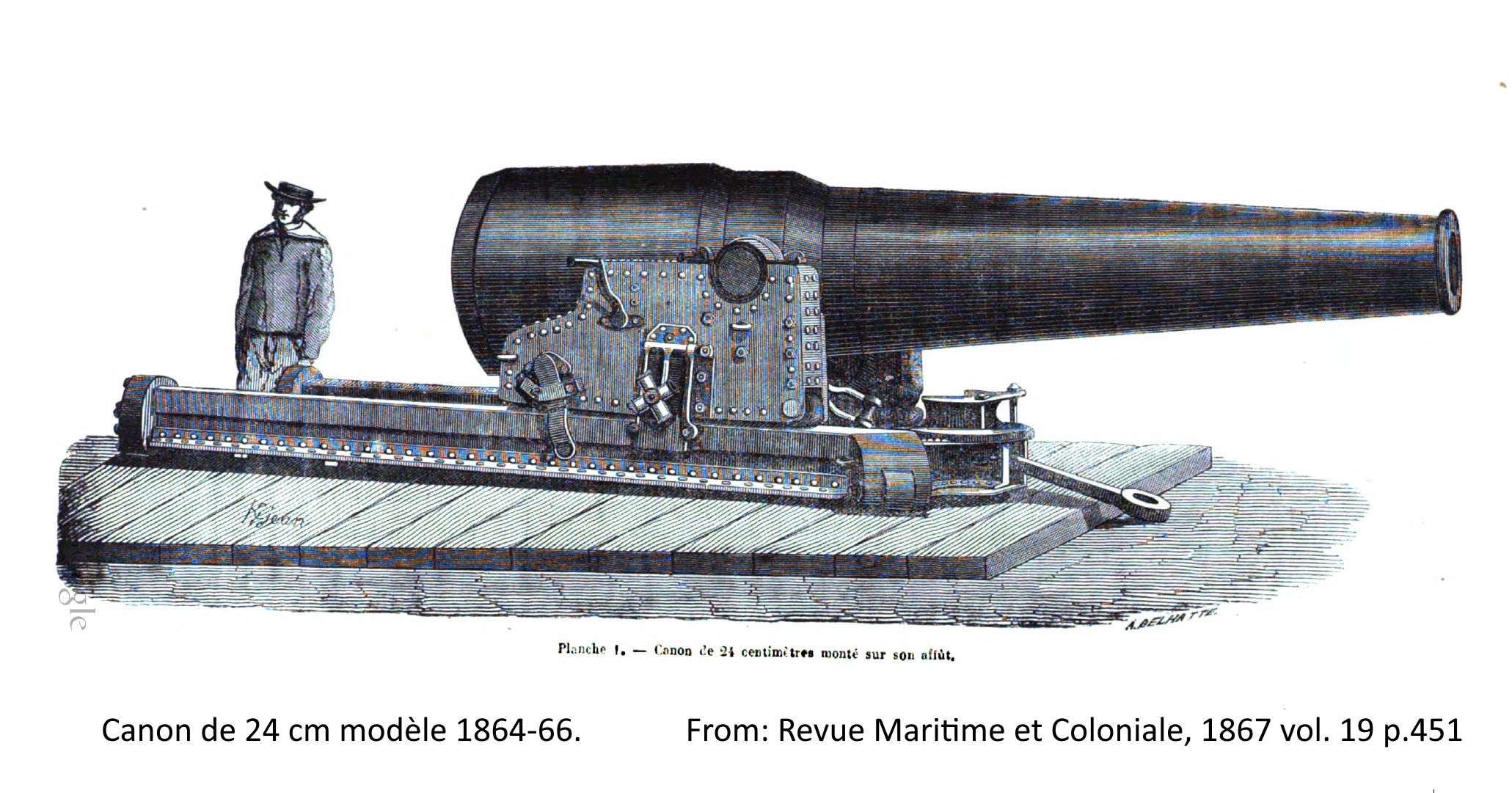
Early model on carriage for use on a gun deck

In a June 1866 session of the French Parliament, Henri Dupuy de Lôme gave some details about the rifled modèle 1864 guns that were being developed. He first stated the weight of the 16 and 19 cm guns and that of the projectiles they used. Dupuy de Lôme then said that the 24 cm gun was the heaviest piece intended for use on board, and that it weighed 14,000 kg. His statements about the projectiles that the 24 cm gun used were in the future tense. The gun would shoot a massive a massive steel oblong projectile of 144 kg as well as an oblong grenade of 100 kg and a round explosive bullet of 48 kg.

In a work printed in 1867, the 24 cm modèle 1864 gun was said to be 4.56 m long, to have a diameter of 0.98 m at the breech, and to weigh 14,000 kg. The weight of the gun was later said to be 14,500 kg instead of 14,000 kg.

The weight given in 1867 might seem to originate from a rounding decision. There is however a compelling reason to assume that the early model indeed weighed only 14,000 kg. The same publication that noted the weight as 14,000 kg also published an image of the gun. This image shows that for this early model, the part of the barrel behind the trunnions had a bigger diameter than that at the trunnions. Later drawings show the diameter to be the same at the trunnions and just behind the trunnions.

=== At the 1867 Paris Exposition ===
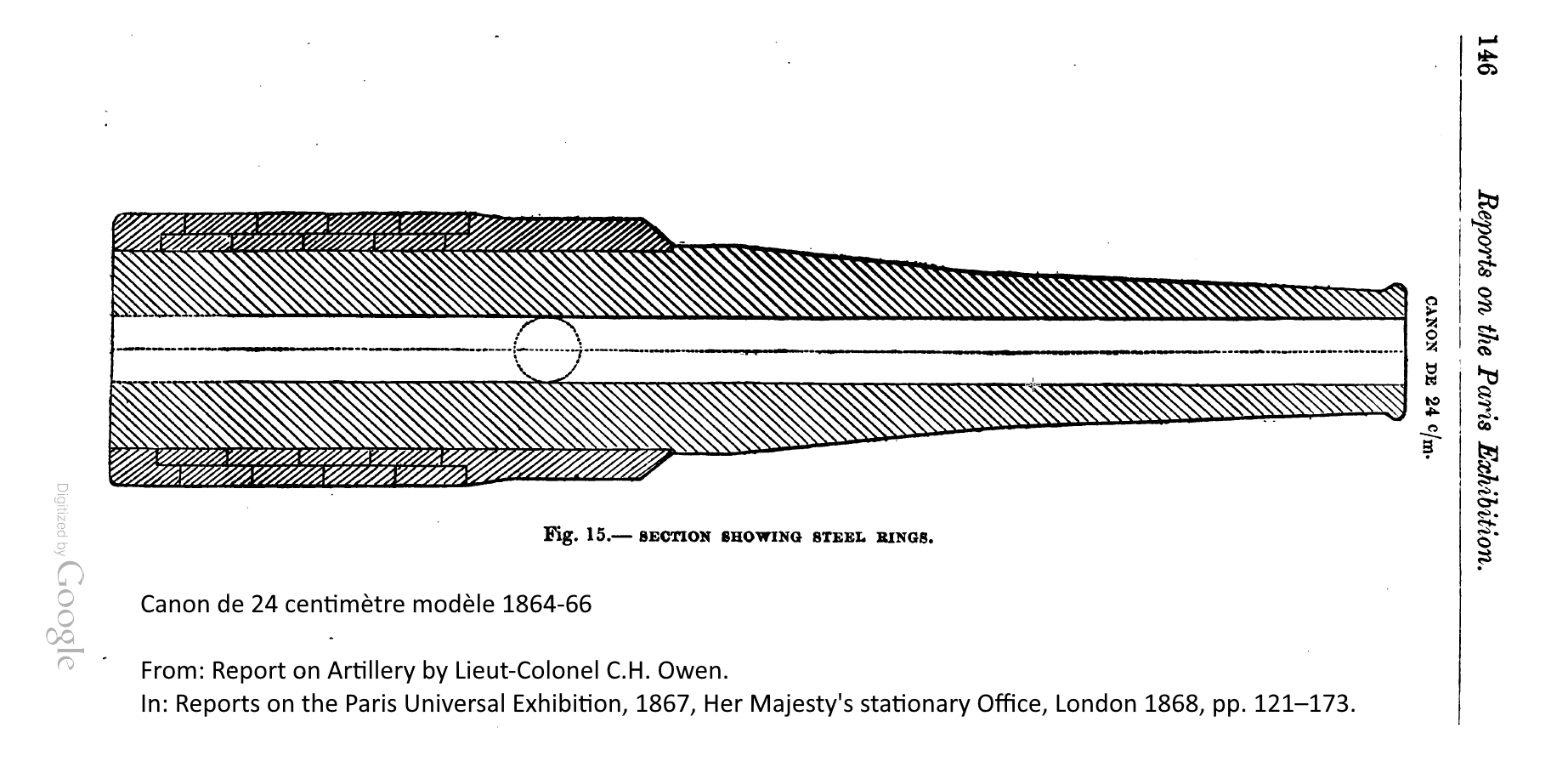
In a report about the 1867 Paris World Exhibition

At the Paris Exposition Universelle (1867), two of the modèle 1864 guns were shown. However, these arrived only in July. One of the drawings published on account of the exhibition shows an early model of the barrel of the 24 cm modèle 1864. Another exhibitor at the fair was the company Compagnie des Hauts-fourneaux, forges et aciéries de la Marine et des chemins de fer, commonly known as Petin and Gaudet. This made the steel rings for the M 1864 guns and had supplied such rings to: Italy, Spain, England, Denmark, Russia, Turkey, and Norway.

=== The Canon de 24 C modèle 1864 T 70 ===
The 'Canon de 24 C modèle 1864 Transformé au modèle 1870' was a Canon de 24 C modèle 1864 transformed to be like the Canon de 24 C modèle 1870. The primary change consisted of boring up the barrel and introducing a steel inner tube through the muzzle. This inner tube ran the entire length of bore of the barrel, instead of being shorter like that of the M 70. This operation could only be done after first heating up the barrel to remove the existing rings. This relieved the stress on the barrel, making it possible to insert the inner tube, which of course came under stress after the barrel cooled down. After the gun had been 'tubed', the rings could then be placed back, making it all quite costly.

The length of the powder chamber of the Canon de 24 C modèle 1864 T 70 was increased, meaning that the length of the barrel that could be used to accelerate the projectile decreased. The use of a higher charge of (slower burning) gunpowder nevertheless allowed the projectiles to attain higher velocities without leading to higher peak pressures.

The other changes were inside the inner tube, which got the same rifling as the M 1870. The obturation and ignition were also the same, which necessitated a change to the breech piece. All these changes allowed the 24 C modèle 1864 T 70 to use the same charges and projectiles as the M 70.

== Characteristics ==
=== Barrel and rifling ===
The barrel of the 24 cm modèle 1864 was 4,560 mm long. It was made of cast iron hooped with steel rings. Early designs were for a barrel with either a breech à coin or a screw (à vis) breech. In the end, the barrels with an à coin breech were not put into service and were modified.

The length of bore of the barrel was 4,197 mm. There were many changes to the dimensions of the rifled part, the transitional cone and the chamber. In the final June 1868 design, the length of the 'partie cylindrique' (rifled part?) of the barrel was 3,511.5 mm. The dimensions of the powder chamber were then set at 645 by 252.8 mm, but in the end it was 651 mm long. There was a 25 mm long transitional cone. The place for the obturator was 33 mm long. In the final design, the length of the place were the breech set was 277.5 mm long. Ignition of the charge took place via a traditional hold drilled towards the chamber at 500 mm before the breech.

There were five grooves, which were also changed on multiple occasions. At the muzzle they were 55 mm wide. Groove number 1 was a bit different from the other ones.

The inner configuration of the Canon de 24 C modèle 1864 T 70 was the same as that of the Canon de 24 C modèle 1870.

=== Hoops / rings ===
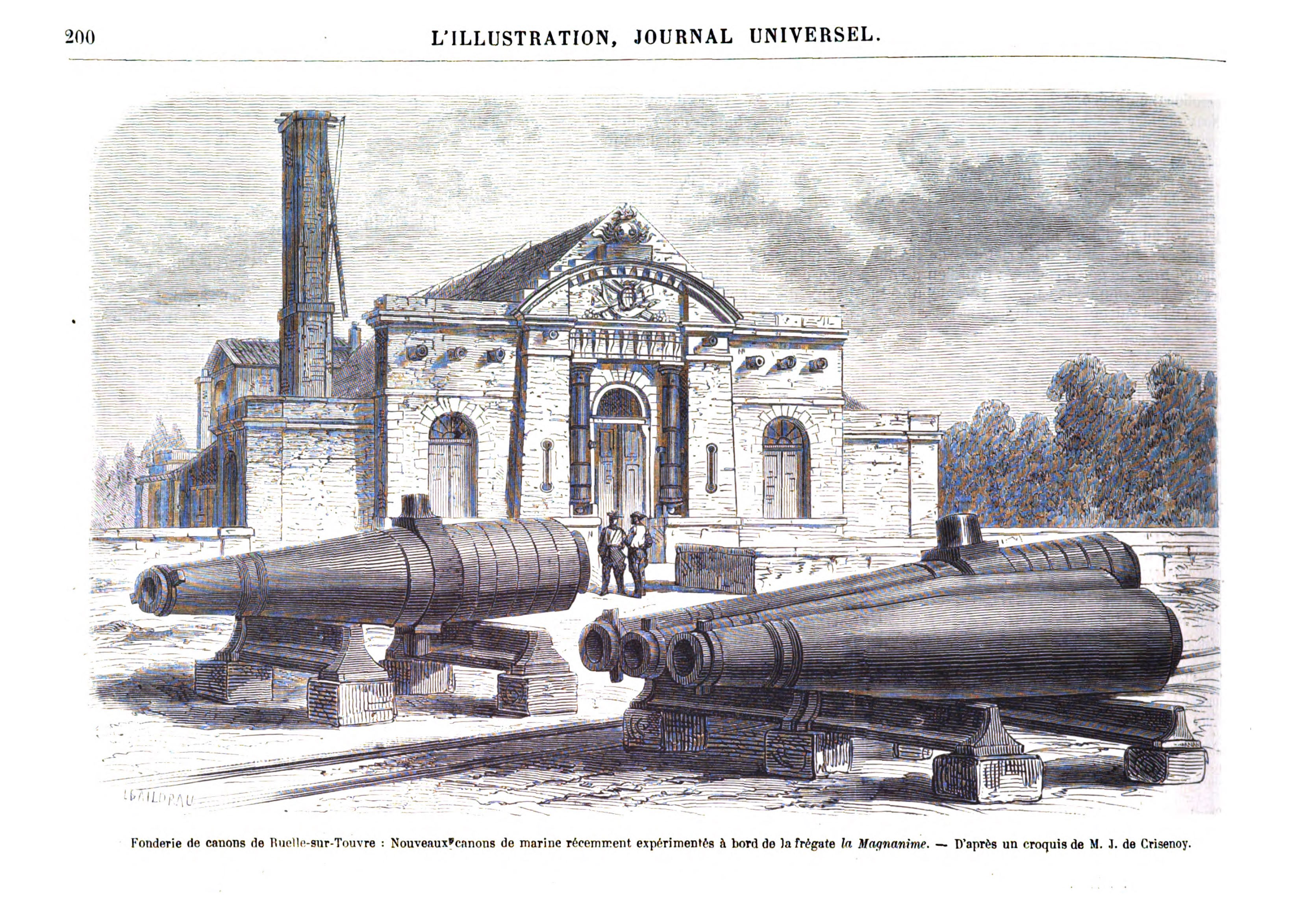
24 cm at Ruelle Foundry

The details of the system of ringing / hooping the gun are interesting in order to distinguish between early and late models of the gun. Early designs called for a single or a double layer of rings. Two systems of single layer hooping were applied. In September 1866, the double layer of rings became mandatory, but this also had variations. The December 1864 double layer system had 11 rings in the first layer and six in the second.

The September 1866 system of two layers of rings was widely applied. The part of the barrel where the rings were applied had a diameter of 720 mm. On the first layer, the September 1866 system had (from the breech side), a breech ring that was 125 mm thick and covered the next ring for a length of 100 mm. Next came four rings of 250 mm length and 60 mm thickness. These were followed by a ring that was tronconic in front and was cut in over a length of 100 mm to give support to the last ring of the second layer. The trunnion ring came next and was 300 mm long and 107 mm thick. In front of this came an unspecified ring that was before the trunnion ring. In January 1867, this design was changed by placing two rings below a thinner trunnion ring. The layers of rings of these designs were all 1.98 m long and 125 mm thick. The above engraving published about the gun as shown at the 1867 Paris World's Fair has very strong similarities to this description. It might also apply to the surviving La Valérie canon.

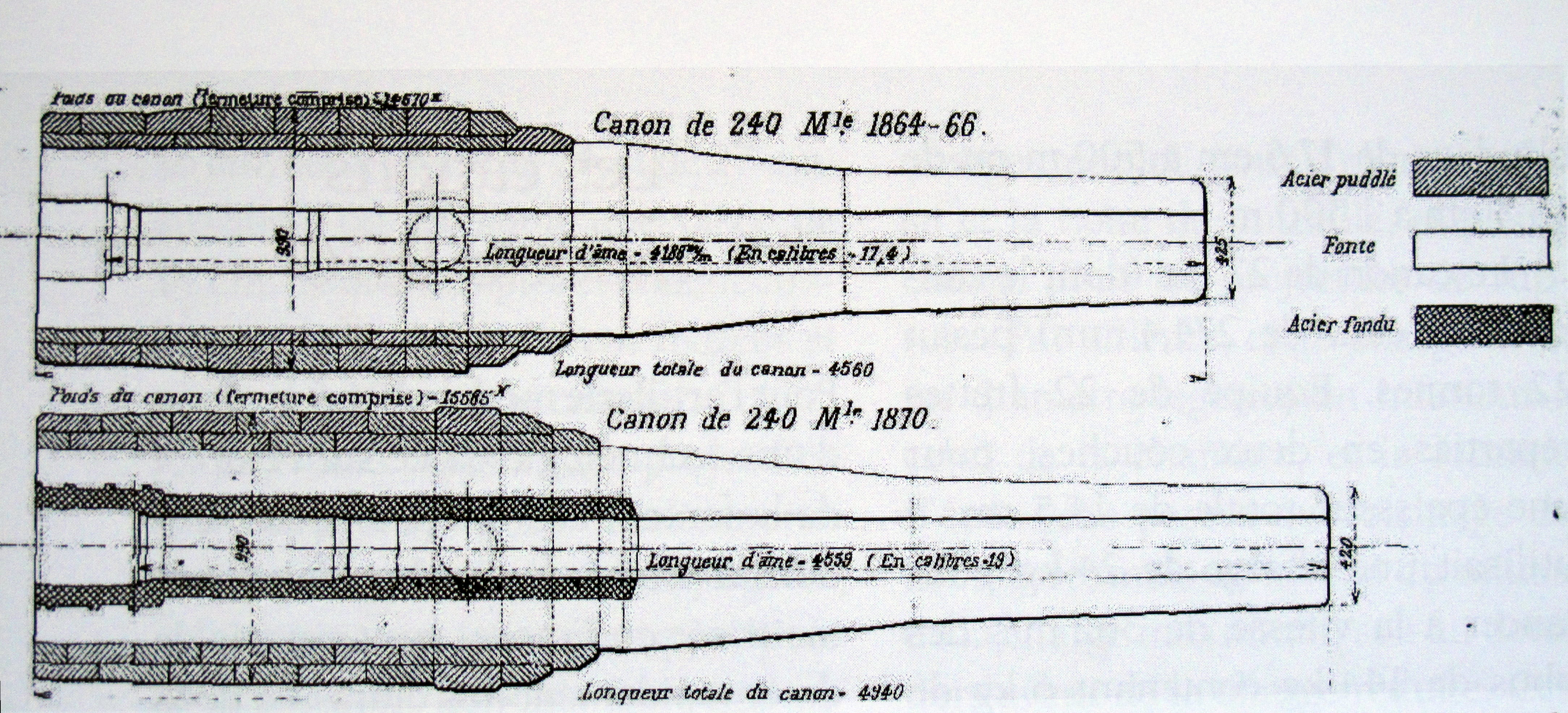
M 1864-66 and M 1870

The final configuration called for two layers of the rings and was determined in February 1867. This final system had 8 rings in both layers. The first layer was 2,000 mm long, the second was 1,817 mm long. The first layer had 8 rings of 250 mm length. The seven nearest the breech were 65 mm thick. The one near the muzzle had a tronconic side to make the transition to the barrel and had a shoulder for the first ring of the second layer. From the side of the muzzle, the second layer had: a tronconic ring before the trunnion ring to smoothen the transition to the increased diameter; four 250 mm long rings of 70 mm thickness of which the first held the trunnions; a ring that was tronconic at the back to transition to a decreased diameter; and finally two rings of 60 mm thickness nearest the breech. The total diameter of the barrel near the breech was therefore 720 + (2*(65 + 60)) = 970 mm. At its thickest, the diameter was 990 mm. This description matches the image 'M 1864-66 and M 1870'.

=== Projectiles ===
There were multiple kinds of projectiles for the 24 cm modèle 1864. There was a regular cast iron grenade; a chilled cast iron armor-piercing grenade; a steel armor-piercing grenade; cast iron exercise grenades and canister shot. These all had two rows of five studs that guided the projectile through the barrel to give it rotation.

In general, the weight of the projectiles was twice that of the solid round cast iron shot for the caliber. The weight of the charge was between 1/6 and 1/7th of the weight of the projectile.

The regular grenade of cast iron was called obus oblong en fonte literally meaning 'long grenade of cast iron'. It was about 2.25 times as long as its diameter, i.e. L/2.25. Of this, the ogive part was between 1 and 1.25 calibers long. This grenade weighed 100 kg, of which the explosive charge was 4.676 kg.

The chilled cast iron armor piercing grenade obus oblong en fonte dure was about L/2.5 long. This grenade weighed 144 kg, of which the explosive charge weighed 1.850 kg.

The boulet ogival en acier was a steel armor-piercing shot. The earliest steel shot were either ogive (called ogivo-cylindrique) or cylindrical. The cylindrical steel shot were intended for use on the shortest ranges, the ogive ones for somewhat longer ranges. After September 1868, the cylindrical projectiles were changed to become ogive. The steel AP projectile weighed 144 kg.

The ogival cast iron exercise shot was about L/2.5 long. It was modeled on the steel shot, but was longer to compensate for the lower density of cast iron.

The Canon de 24 C modèle 1864 T 70 used the projectiles of the Canon de 24 C modèle 1870.

=== Velocity ===
The velocity at which an armor-piercing projectile left the barrel of the gun was crucial for its ability to penetrate armor. In general, a higher (propellant) charge meant a higher velocity, but also a higher peak pressure. Changing the construction of the gun could make it more resilient to these pressures. In 1867, the charge used for the armor-piercing shot was given as 20 kg.

In the early 1880s, the charge for the armor piercing shot (projectile de rupture) was given as 24 kg. With this charge a velocity of 340 m/s was attained. For the Canon de 24 C modèle 1864 T. 70, the charge for the armor piercing grenade was given as 41.5 kg and velocity was 480 m/s.

The regular grenade was fired with lower charges. In 1867 and in the early 1880s, this was 16 kg. This did not mean that velocity was not important. At the maximum range of about 8 km, the flight of the projectile took about 45 seconds, during which the wind would blow it off course. However, while working with pressures closer to the maximum, the actual pressure in the gun was less predictable. When the gun was changed to become the 24 C modèle 1864 T. 70, it used a charge of 37 kg of slower burning gunpowder, which gave a 120 kg regular grenade the same velocity as the armor-piercing shot, i.e. 480 m/s.

=== Range ===
The ballistic tables of the 24 cm gun gave its ranges for the different projectiles, charges and elevations. With a charge of 24 kg, the armor-piercing massive ogive shot had an effective range of 1,400 m. With the 20 kg charge, this was only 1,000 m. The ogive exercise shot was fired with 16 kg, and therefore got no further than 600 m. For the armor-piercing cylindrical projectile the ranges with 24 kg and 20 kg were also 1,400 and 1,000 m.

The regular grenade did not have to pierce armor by its mechanical impact. It could therefore be fired at a higher elevation, relying on the explosive charge of the grenade to damage the target. With a charge of 16 kg and at an elevation of 37.5°, the grenade (obus oblong) could be used to hit targets at a distance of 8,000 m. However, the maximum elevation of the naval 'battery' carriages (below) was probably no more than 11 degrees. At that elevation, the maximum range was only 4,000 m.

=== Naval carriages ===
There were two kinds of gun deck or battery deck naval carriages: the modèle 1864 and the modèle 1867. With some changes (improved brakes), both could also be used for the Canon de 24 C modèle 1870. These carriages consisted of an upper carriage that recoiled backwards over a frame (châssis) called slide. During this movement a compressor brake caught the recoil. These carriages were meant to be used on the battery deck of a ship and therefore had only limited elevation.

=== Coastal carriages ===
The Canon de 24 C modèle 1864 is also well known as a coastal gun. For this role, multiple carriages were available. The affût de côte a pivot a l'avant pour canons de 24 cent. was a carriage that consisted of a wooden upper carriage and a cast iron slide. At its front, the slide was attached to a pivot, which kept the slide in place and allowed it to turn on semi-circular rails. The whole was placed on a platform of masonry placed behind an earthen breastwork.

The affût de côte a pivot central pour canons de 24 cent. was made for situations that required a large horizontal arc of fire. As its name implies, the carriage revolved around a central pivot and thus on circular rails.

The Canon de 24 C modèle 1864 T 70 used the same carriages as the Canon de 24 C modèle 1870.

== 24 cm ijzer ==
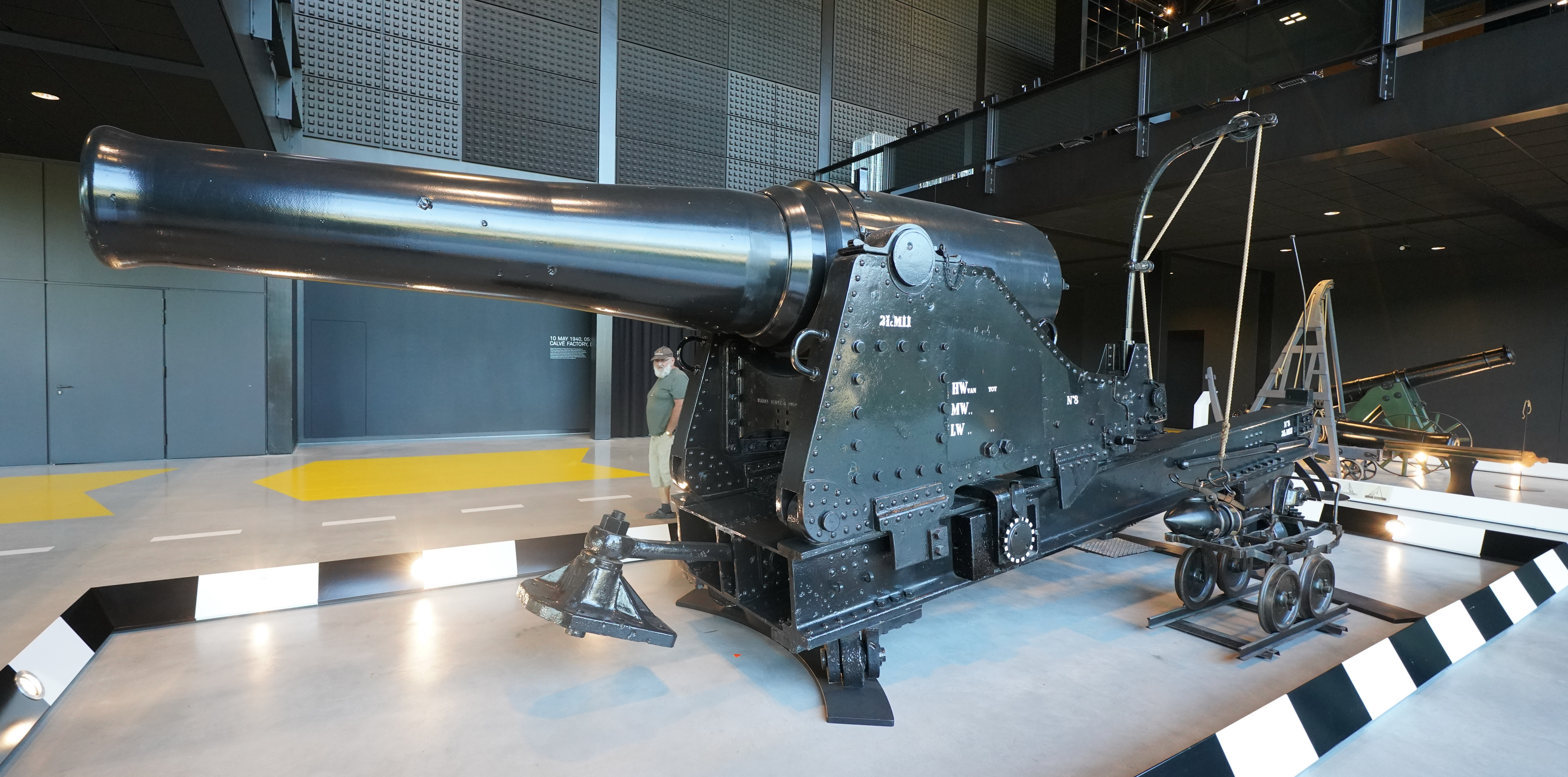
24 cm ijzer in the Nationaal Militair Museum in Soesterberg

In December 1867, the Dutch government appointed a commission to investigate the possibilities to quickly acquire heavy coastal guns. In March 1868, this commission advised to buy six Canon de 24 C modèle 1864. It advised to have the barrels cast by the Finspång Ironworks. The rings should be made by the Compagnie des Hauts-fourneaux, forges et aciéries de la Marine et des chemins de fer in Rive-de-Gier. The breech should be made by Varral, Elwell & Poulot in Paris, and the whole should be assembled in Sweden. This advice led to dozens of 24 C modèle 1864 getting made for the Dutch army.

In 1872, the Dutch government planned to have 89 guns of 24 cm caliber. Of these 52 would be used in the Fortifications of Den Helder to protect the naval base there. To protect the accesses to Rotterdam, 4 guns would be placed in Brielle; 13 in Hellevoetsluis; and 20 in Willemstad, North Brabant. In the end, not all of these guns would be 24 cm ijzer.

== Use ==
=== On French ships ===
The Gloire-class ironclads were initially armed with 36 16 cm modèle 1858-60 guns. In 1869, Gloire's 34 battery deck guns were replaced by six Canon de 24 C modèle 1864. There were three on each side, mounted on the carriage with iron frame model 1867.

The Magenta-class ironclads Magenta and Solférino were also initially armed with smoothbore guns. In 1866 Solférino got ten Canon de 24 C modèle 1864. When Magenta sank, she had ten 24 cm M 1864 guns on the battery deck.

The Provence-class ironclads were also planned to get smoothbore guns. However, by the time they were nearing completion, this changed. By then, Flandre was planned to get a mixed armament of twenty 50-pounder smoothbore guns and ten 16 cm rifled guns. Later, this became eight Canon de 24 C modèle 1864 on the battery deck and four 19 cm breechloaders higher up. The other nine ships of the class underwent the same changes to their armament as Flandre.

After France bought USS Dunderberg and renamed her to Rochambeau, she was rearmed. She got four Canon de 27 C modèle 1864 and ten Canon de 24 C modèle 1864. The United States monitor Onondaga was re-armed with four Canon de 24 C modèle 1864 after she was acquired by France in May 1867.

=== Other French usage ===
On land, the Canon de 24 C modèle 1864 was of course used to arm a number of coastal defense batteries. However, the gun was also used in land battles during the Franco-Prussian War.

== Surviving examples ==
=== French ===
The 'La Valérie canon' is an object classed as movable cultural heritage. It was used during the Siege of Paris (1870–1871), taken to Berlin as a trophy in 1871, brought to Paris after World War I, moved back to Berlin in 1940 and brought to the French Army Museum at Les Invalides in 1947. In 1989 it was re-installed at Fort Mont-Valérien.

In 2004 a Canon de 24 C modèle 1864 was found in Papeete, capital of French Polynesia. It has since been mounted on a concrete base. Some images can be found at: Des canons du XIXe siècle... à Tahiti

=== Dutch ===
The 24 cm ijzer in the Nationaal Militair Museum of the Netherlands was originally placed at Willemstad. It was damaged when the previous artillery museum at Doorwerth Castle came under fire during the 1944 Operation Market Garden.

In July 2007 one of the 24 ijzer guns of Hellevoetsluis was unearthed at the beach. It has since been mounted at the fortress on a reconstructed carriage.
