= Fort Clinch State Park =

State park in Florida, United States

- IUCN category IV (habitat/species management area)
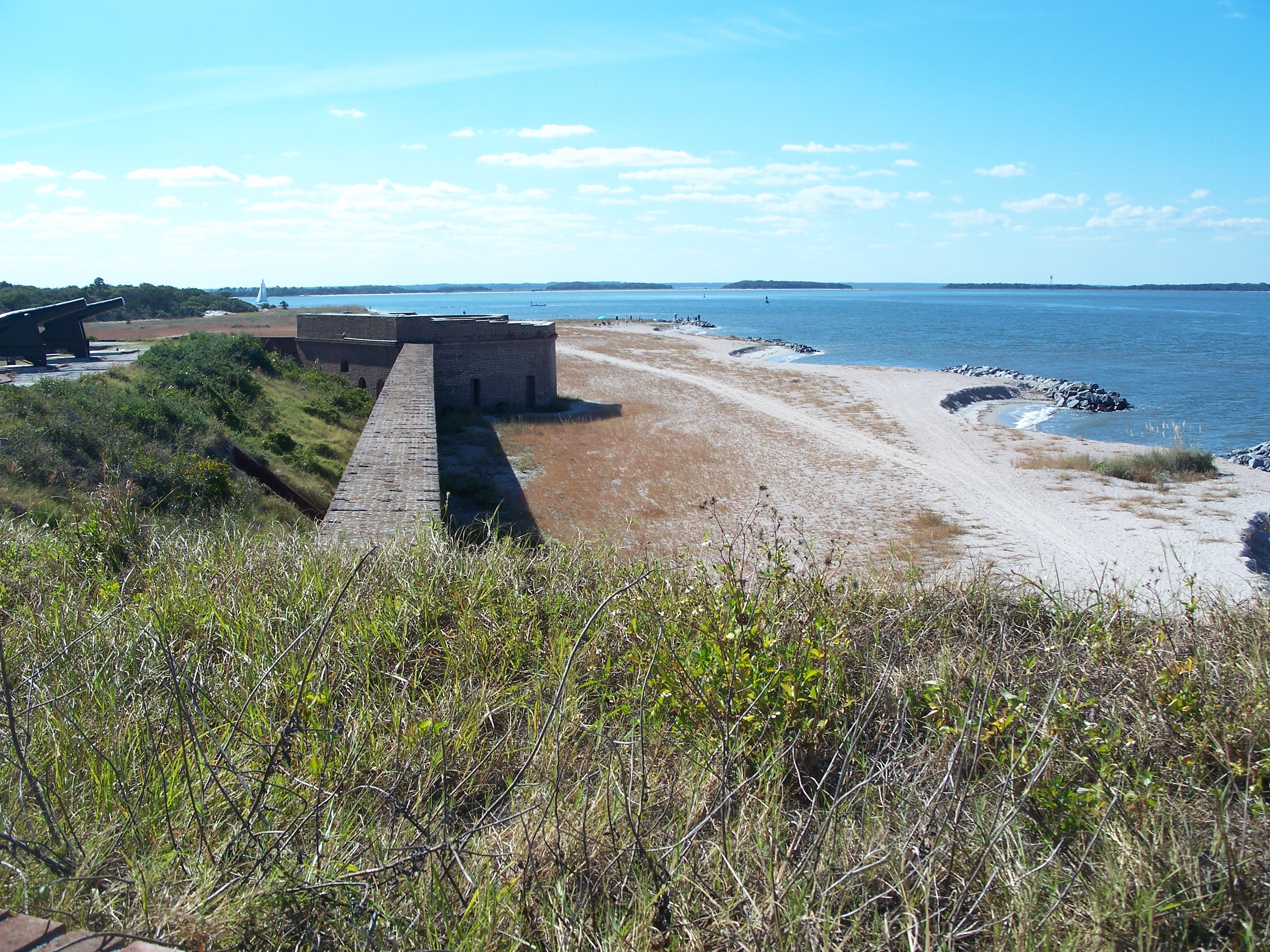
- View from the fort wall

- Location within Florida Location within the United States
- Interactive map of Fort Clinch State Park
- Location: Nassau County, Florida, United States
- Nearest city: Fernandina Beach, Florida
- Coordinates: 30°42′16.88″N 81°27′16.06″W
- Area: 1,100 acres (4 km^{2})
- Established: April 21, 1905
- Visitors: 167,000 (in an average year)
- Governing body: Florida Department of Environmental Protection

The Fort Clinch State Park is a Florida State Park, located on a peninsula near the northernmost point of Amelia Island, along the Amelia River. Its 1,100 acres (4 km^{2}) include the 19th-century Fort Clinch, sand dunes, plains, maritime hammock and estuarine tidal marsh. The park and fort lie to the northeast of Fernandina Beach at the entrance to the Cumberland Sound.

== Fort Clinch ==
Fort Clinch is a 19th-century brick fortress begun in 1847 after the end of the Second Seminole War. It was named in honor of General Duncan Lamont Clinch, important figure in the First and Second Seminole Wars. No battles were fought at Fort Clinch. Confederate troops occupied the incomplete fort in 1861 when Union forces were withdrawn from Florida. In 1862 Confederate forces were withdrawn from the fort because their manpower was needed elsewhere and Union forces regained control of the area without any shots being fired. Union forces restarted construction of the fort and continued through the end of the war. The fort would become a base of operations for Union forces in the area for the remainder of the Reconstruction Era.

In 1935, the State of Florida bought 256 acres (1.0 km^{2}) that included the then-abandoned fort and the surrounding area. Fort Clinch State Park including the fort, opened to the public in 1938.

== Recreational activities ==
In addition to exploring Fort Clinch, activities include pier fishing, sunbathing, hiking, surfcasting, camping, birding, and shelling. Visitors can also enjoy picnicking, swimming, bicycling, beachcombing, and wildlife viewing. Park personnel reenact military life at the fort. Among the wildlife of the park are the rare purple sandpiper, alligators, white-tailed deer, and other birds. Visitors can also see dolphins and manatees.

Amenities include a visitor information center, beach access boardwalks with cold showers as well as restroom/changing rooms, several miles of beach, 3.3 miles (5.3 km) of paved road, and a six-mile (10 km) hiking trail. The park has two campgrounds, one on the Amelia River, the other on the Atlantic Beach. The Amelia River campground has two hot-water restroom/shower facilities for 41 campsites in an oak hammock. The Atlantic Beach campground has one hot-water restroom/shower facility for 21 sites with a ramped boardwalk. The park also offers primitive camping and youth camping.

The park is a gateway site for the Great Florida Birding Trail.

== Military re-enactments ==
On the first weekend of each month, costumed interpreters perform living history re-enactments of a Civil War soldier's life in 1864 at Fort Clinch. Activities include military drills, and working in the fort's laundry, infirmary, kitchen, barracks, quartermaster, United States Sanitary Commission and carpenter shop.

The fort holds other encampments during the year.

== Hours ==
The park is open from 8:00 am until sundown year round.

== Gallery ==
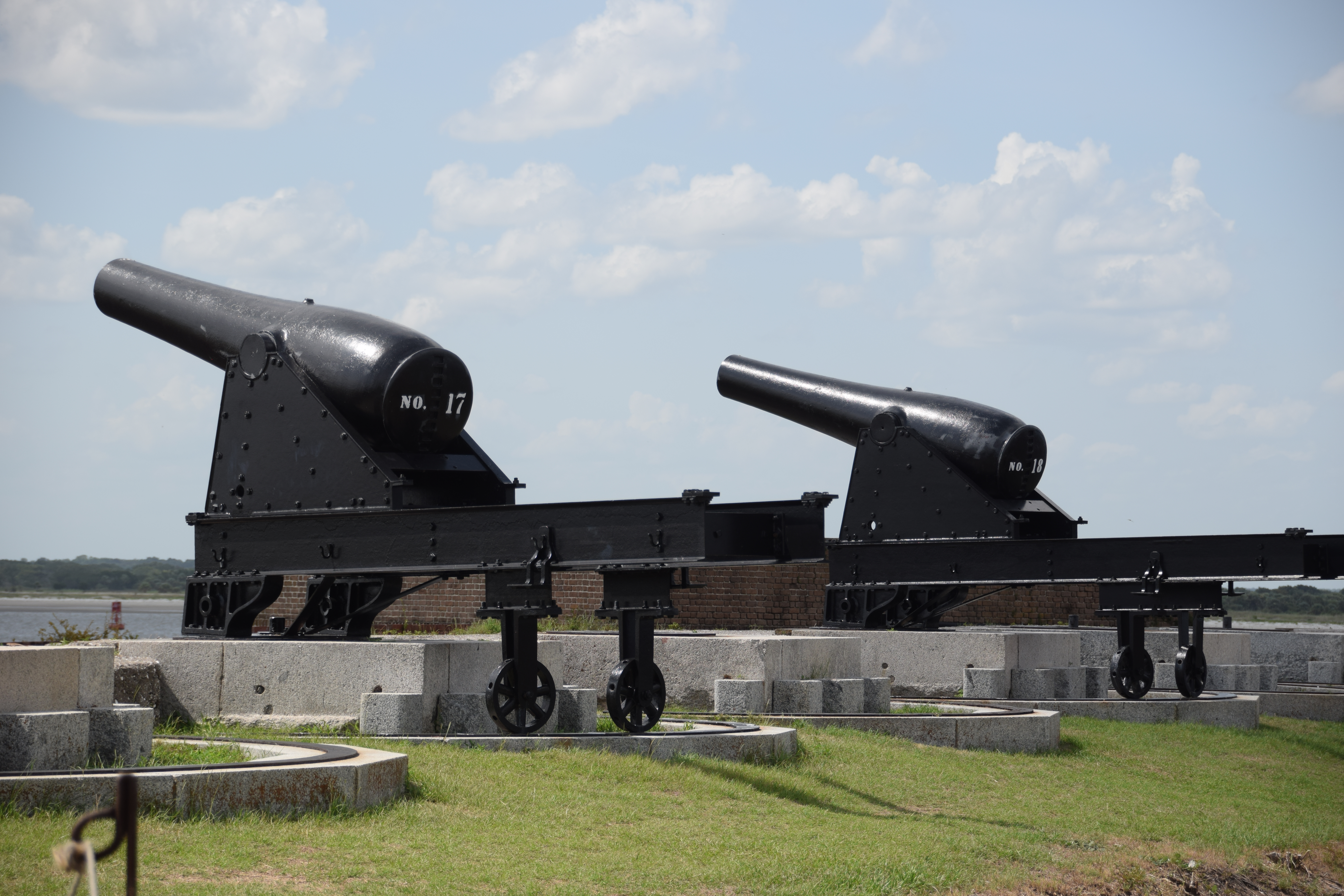
10-inch Rodman guns

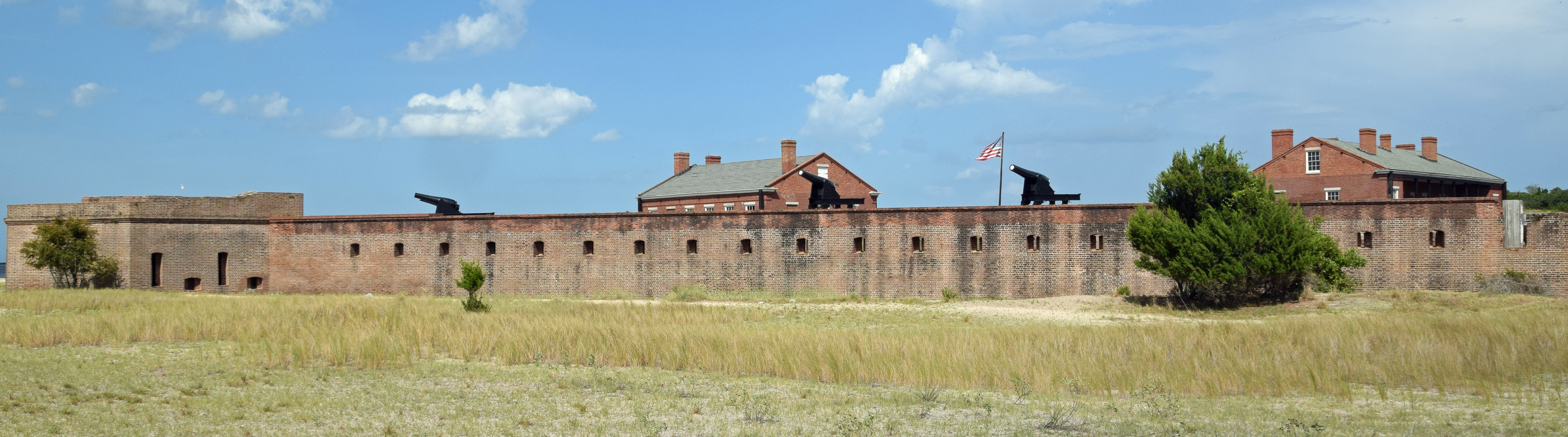
Wall facing the ocean
