= Battery Rodgers =

- Alexandria, Virginia
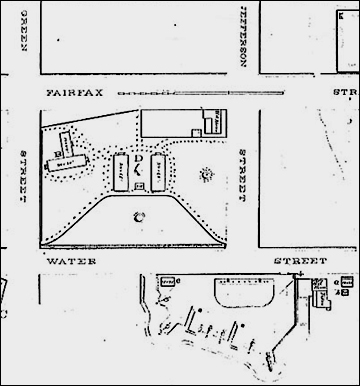
- The layout of Battery Rodgers as it existed during the Civil War. Gun emplacements can be seen at the center bottom of the picture, while the remainder of the battery complex is located in the center.

Site information
- Condition: demolished

Location
- Location within Alexandria, Virginia
- Coordinates: 38.795167°N 77.0433°W

Site history
- Built: 1863
- In use: 1863–1865
- Materials: earth

Battery Rodgers was a gun emplacement that composed a portion of the American Civil War defenses of the American capital city of Washington, D.C.

== Construction ==
Built in 1863, Battery Rodgers was constructed with the ability to interdict sea traffic sailing up the Potomac River to Washington, D.C.. From its position on a 28-foot (8.5 m) high cliff overlooking Battery Cove, it was positioned with a clear view of fire and was ably suited to guarding the southern Potomac River and Accotink Road (Fort Hunt Road) approaches to Washington. The battery was named for George W. Rodgers, a captain in the Union Navy who was killed during an attack on Fort Wagner.

It was 185 feet (56 m) long with sides of 60 and 80 feet (18 and 24 m). During the war, the battery mounted one 6.4-inch (160 mm) (100-pounder, 45 kg) Parrott rifle and one 15-inch (380 mm) Rodman gun, one of the largest guns in the world at that time. The guns were supplied by two adjacent powder magazines, and the battery complex included a hospital, barracks, mess hall, and prison. It was garrisoned by 6 commissioned officers, 1 ordnance sergeant, and 256 men. Following the conclusion of the war, the Battery was disbanded and its guns were removed to other locations in Washington. The land on which the battery rested was sold soon afterward, due in no small part to its location in the center of Alexandria, Virginia.

Today, no portion of the battery still stands, but it is memorialized by a small marker in Alexandria, at the intersection of South Lee Street and Green Street and the corner of Jones Point Park. The Rodman gun used at the battery was moved across the Potomac to Fort Foote, and can still be seen there today.

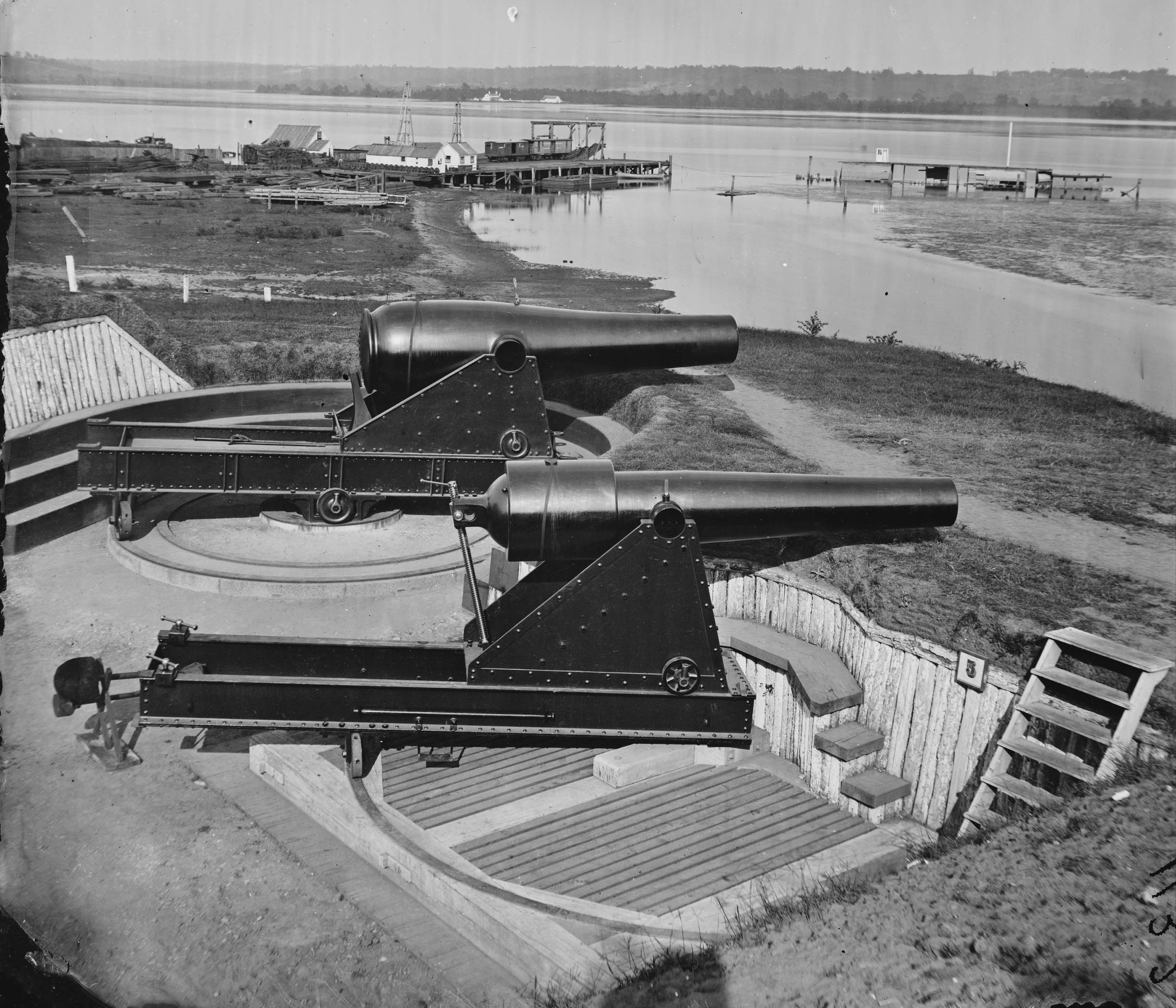
View of Battery Rodgers with 8-inch (200 pdr) Parrott rifle in front and 15-inch Rodman gun behind.

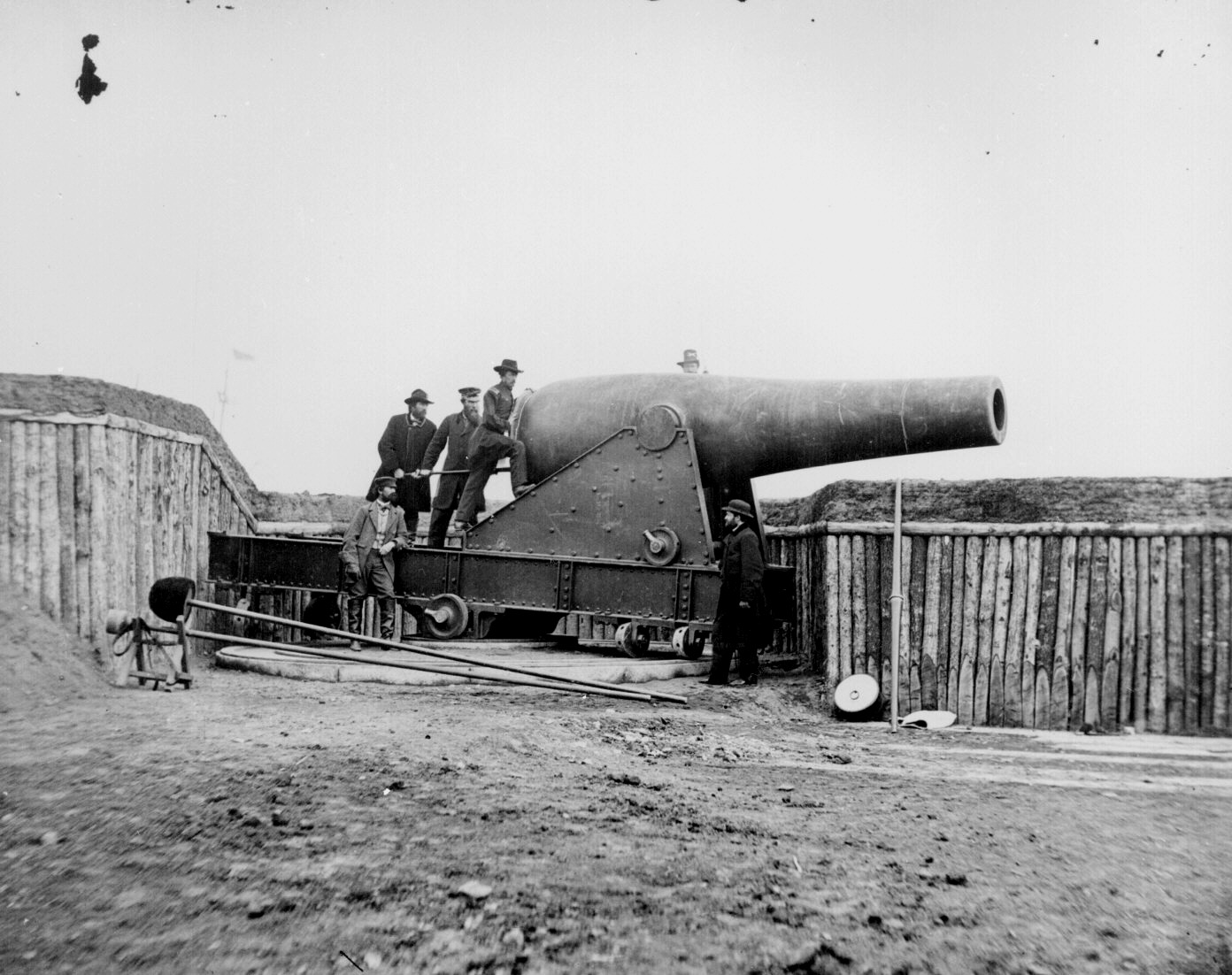
A 15-inch Rodman gun in Battery Rodgers.

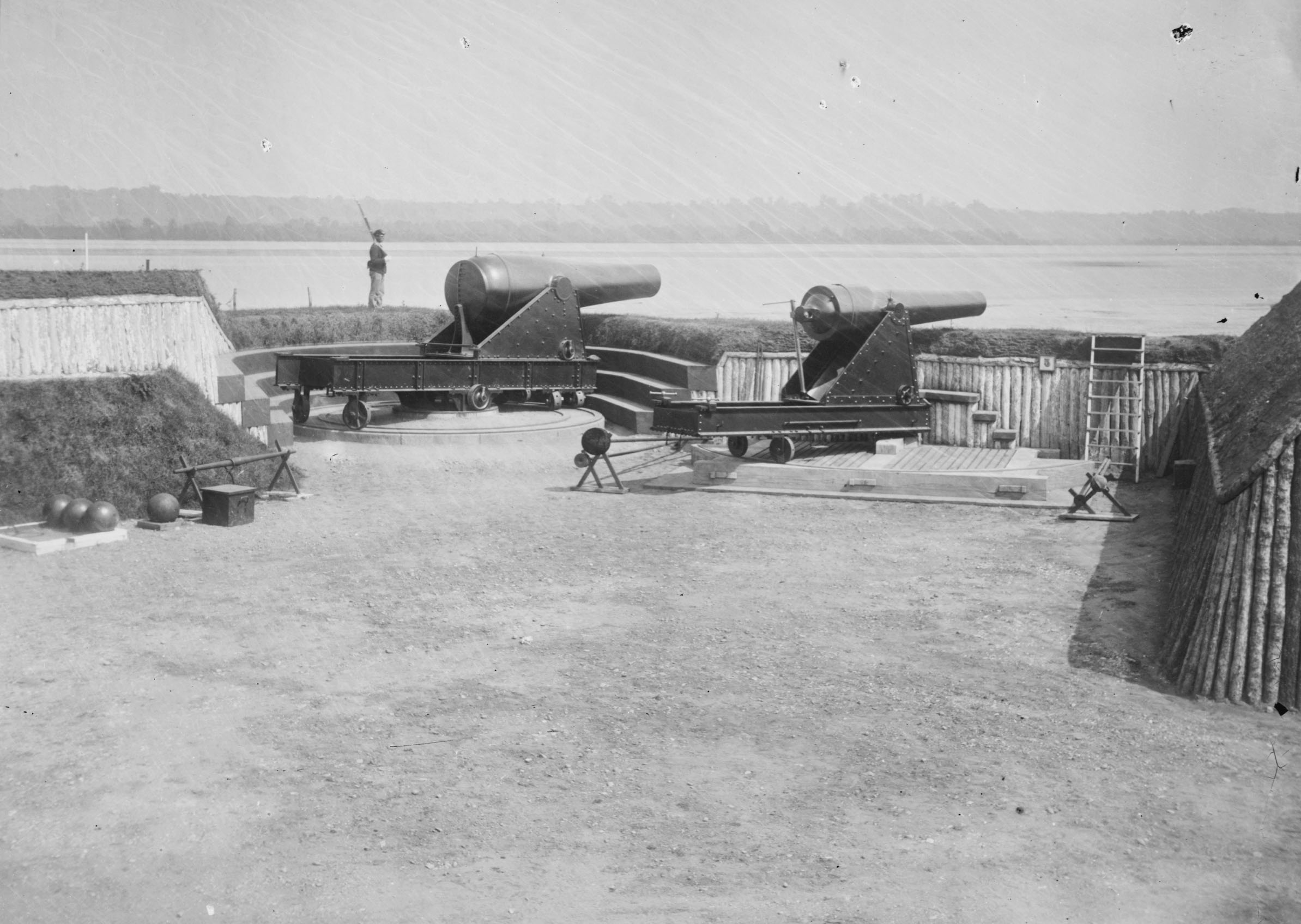
Another view of Battery Rodgers showing the 8-inch (200 pdr) Parrott rifle and the 15-inch Rodman gun.

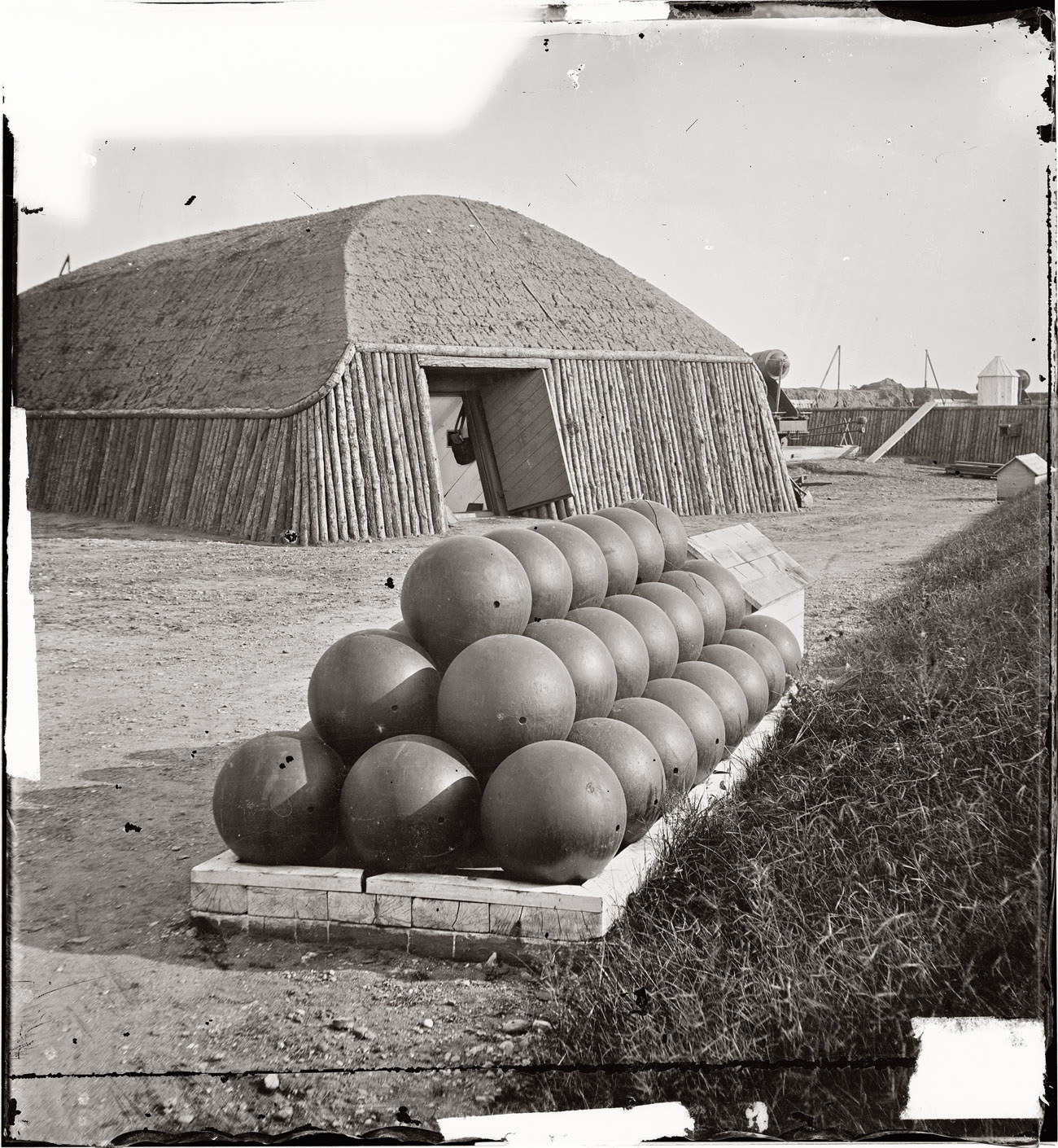
One of the dug-in ammunition magazines at Battery Rodgers.

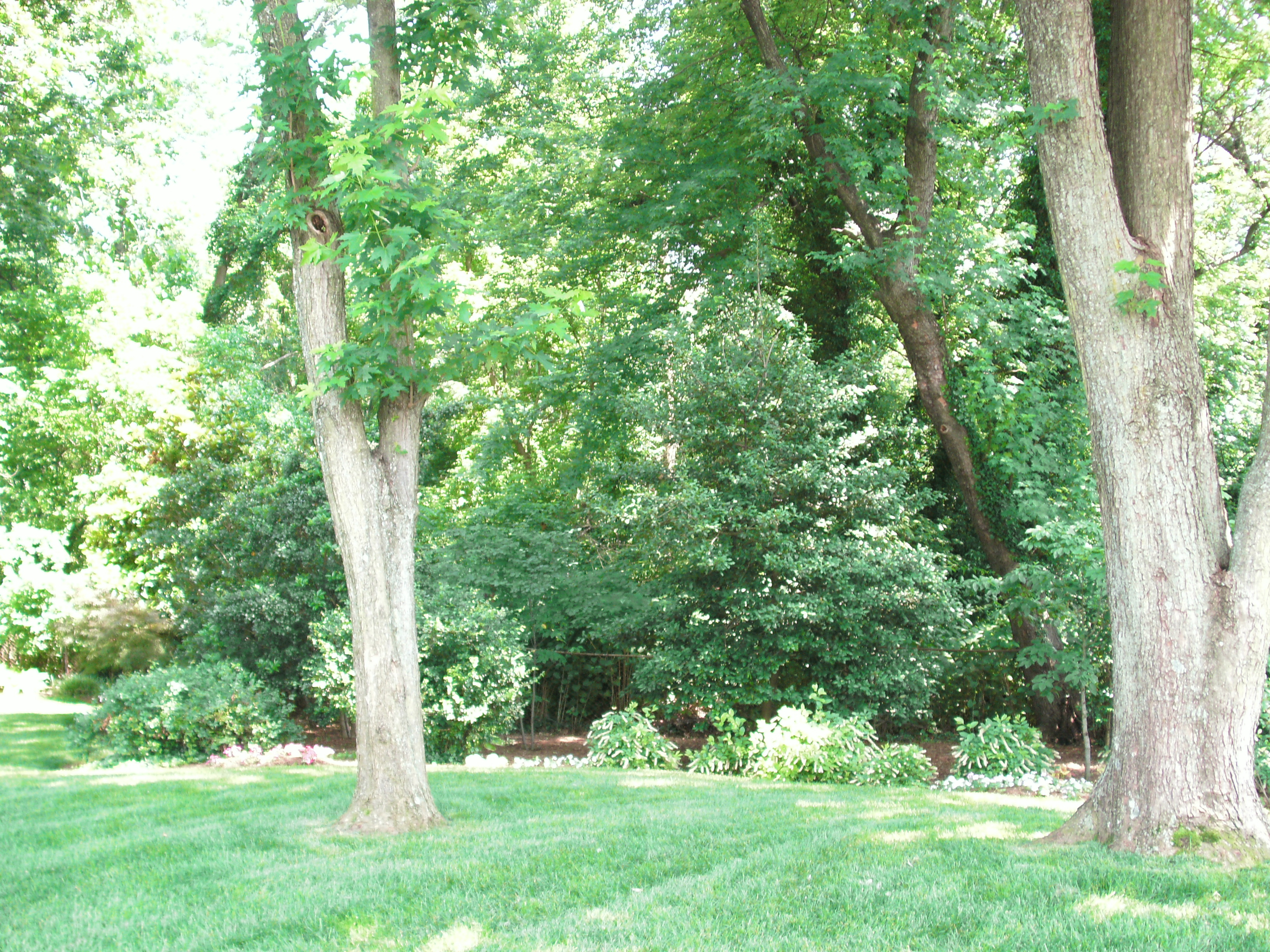
The site of Battery Rodgers in 2009
