= Rodman gun =

Type of American Civil War–era cannon

Drawing comparing Model 1844 8-inch columbiad and Model 1861 10-inch "Rodman" columbiad. The powder chamber on the older columbiad is highlighted by the red box.

The Rodman gun is any of a series of American Civil War–era columbiads designed by Union artillery officer Thomas Jackson Rodman (1815–1871). The guns were designed to fire both shot and shell. These heavy guns were intended to be mounted in seacoast fortifications. 8-inch, 10-inch, 13-inch, 15-inch, and 20-inch bore (20, 25, 33, 38, and 51 cm) Rodman guns were produced. Other than size, the guns were all nearly identical in design, with a curving bottle shape, a large flat cascabel, and ratchets or sockets for the elevating mechanism. Rodman guns were true guns that did not have a howitzer-like powder chamber, as did many earlier columbiads. Rodman guns differed from all previous artillery because they were hollow cast, a new technology that Rodman developed that resulted in cast-iron guns that were much stronger than their predecessors.

== Casting ==
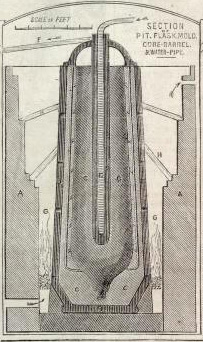
Engraving showing a gun being cast using Rodman's hollow-casting technique. The engraving shows the gun mold in the casting pit. The outer iron flask, the fire built outside the flask, and the cooling core are also shown.

Traditionally, a gun was cast as a solid body, with the bore then drilled out of the solid metal. In this method, a newly cast gun cooled from the outside in. Castings shrink as they cool. As each succeeding layer cooled it contracted, pulling away from the still molten metal in the center, creating voids and tension cracks. Drilling out the bore removed the voids, but the tensions in the metal were still toward the outside. Rodman devised a method of hollow casting where the gun cooled from the inside out, so that as cooling occurred, it created compression rather than tension. This resulted in a much stronger gun.

In Rodman's method, a cooling core was placed in the mold before casting. This core consisted of a watertight cast-iron tube, closed at the lower end. A second, smaller tube, open at the bottom was inserted into the first. As the molten iron was poured into the mold, water was pumped through the smaller tube to the bottom of the larger tube. The water rose through the space between the two tubes and flowed out at the top. The water continued flowing as the metal cooled. To further ensure that the gun cooled from the inside out, a fire was built around the iron flask containing the gun mold, keeping the gun mold nearly red-hot. For an 8-inch Rodman columbiad, the core was removed 25 hours after casting and the flow of water continued through the space left by the core for another 40 hours. Over 50,000 US gallons (190 m^{3}) of water was used in the process. For larger guns, the cooling periods were longer and more water was used.

After cooling the gun, the machining process began. The bore was bored out to proper size, the exterior was turned smooth, the trunnions were turned on a trunnion lathe, and a vent was drilled.

Columbiads were not the only guns cast using Rodman's method. Dahlgren XV-inch shell guns for the US Navy were also hollow cast. A 20-inch hollow cast gun, which may not have been identical to the two guns supplied to the US Army, was sold to Peru.

Rodman guns were cast at the Fort Pitt Foundry, Pittsburgh, Pennsylvania; the Scott Foundry, Reading, Pennsylvania; Cyrus Alger & Co., Boston, Massachusetts; and the West Point Foundry, Cold Spring, New York.

== Carriages ==
Rodman guns were mounted on three types of carriages—a front-pintle barbette carriage, a center-pintle barbette carriage, and a casemate carriage. All of these carriages were made of wrought iron. All three types of carriage were similar in design, having an upper carriage that was placed on a two-rail chassis. The gun and upper carriage recoiled along the chassis. The chassis would pivot to train the gun left or right.

The barbette carriages were designed to fire over a parapet and could be used in either permanent or temporary fortifications. The front pintle carriage pivoted at the front of the chassis. This made the gun mount more compact and allowed the gun and detachment to be better protected by embrasures and traverses. The center pintle carriage gave the gun a 360° traverse and was stronger for guns firing at high angles because the pintle, the strongest part of the carriage, would have been under the breech when the gun was fired at high angles.

The casemate carriage was designed to fire from casemates, which were chambers in permanent fortifications. The carriage was essentially a front-pintle design, with the pintle fixed in the masonry in front of the chassis and below the guns embrasure. A "tongue" connected the chassis to the pintle. The casemate carriage has a lower profile than the barbette carriages.

The 8-inch and 10-inch Rodman guns could be mounted on all three types of carriages. The 15-inch Rodman guns were mounted on both types of barbette carriage. The two 20-inch guns were mounted on front-pintle barbette carriages.

Sling carts were used to transport these guns to the carriages.

== Production ==
Rodman guns were all nearly identical in design, with a curving soda bottle shape, the only differences being the size of the gun. They were all smoothbore guns designed to fire spherical shot and shell, primarily against ships. The guns were elevated and depressed by means of a lever called the elevating bar. The point of this lever fits into ratchets on the earliest guns cast, or sockets on the later guns. The fulcrum, called the ratchet post, fit on the rear transom of the upper carriage. The ratchet post was cast iron and had several notches for adjusting the position of the elevating bar.

Only one 13-inch Rodman gun appears to have been made, but it was placed in service. Two 20-inch Rodman guns were emplaced at Fort Hamilton, New York. A third, shorter 20-inch gun was cast for USS Puritan using the Rodman technology. One 20-inch Rodman gun remains in a park just north of Fort Hamilton, and another is at Fort Hancock, New Jersey.

The other, smaller Rodman guns were placed in seacoast fortifications around the United States. It took eight men to load and fire a 10-inch Rodman gun, and 12 men for a 15-inch Rodman gun.

Over 140 Rodman guns survive today. They may be seen at coastal fortifications around the country.

Type	Length	Weight	Charge	Shot	Shell	Range	Number made	Years made	Current survivors	Foundries	Weight (front pintle carriage)	Weight (center pintle carriage)
M. 1861 8-inch	119.5 in (304 cm)	8,465 lb (3,840 kg)	10 lb (4.5 kg)	65 lb (29 kg)	50 lb (23 kg)	3,873 yd (3,541 m) @ 30° (shell)	213	1861-1865	56	Fort Pitt Foundry, Scott Foundry, West Point Foundry	4,899 lb (2,222 kg)	4,539 lb (2,059 kg)
M. 1861 10-inch	136.7 in (347 cm)	15,509 lb (7,035 kg)	15 lb (6.8 kg)	128 lb (58 kg)	102 lb (46 kg)	4,836 yd (4,422 m) @ 30° (shell)	1,301	1862-1867	99	Fort Pitt Foundry, Scott Foundry, West Point Foundry, Cyrus Alger & Co.	5,031 lb (2,282 kg)	4,626 lb (2,098 kg)
M. 1864 13-inch	177.6 in (451 cm)	3,271 lb (1,484 kg)	30 lb (14 kg)	283 lb (128 kg)	218 lb (99 kg)	-	1	1864	0	-	-	-
M. 1861 15-inch	190 in (480 cm)	49,909 lb (22,638 kg)	40 lb (18 kg)	400 lb (180 kg)	352 lb (160 kg)	5,018 yd (4,588 m) @ 30° (shell)	323	1861-1871	25	Fort Pitt Foundry, Scott Foundry, Cyrus Alger & Co.	22,800 lb (10,300 kg)	21,250 lb (9,640 kg)
M. 1864 20-inch	243.5 in (618 cm)	115,200 lb (52,300 kg)	200 lb (91 kg)	1,080 lb (490 kg)	750 lb (340 kg)	8,001 yd (7,316 m) @ 25° (shot)	2	1864-1869	2	Fort Pitt Foundry	36,000 lb (16,000 kg)	-

== Use ==
Rodman guns saw little action during the Civil War. Two 10-inch columbiads were used in 1864 and 1865 in Union operations against Fort Sumter. It seems likely, due to the time period in which they were used, that these were Rodman guns rather than earlier model columbiads. Other reports of the use of 8-inch and 10-inch columbiads may refer to Rodman guns. The 15-inch Rodman guns were never fired in anger; however, they were widely deployed in coast defense until replaced by Endicott Period fortifications in 1895–1905. Some Rodmans of various sizes, along with Parrott rifles, were deployed shortly after the outbreak of the Spanish–American War in 1898 as a stopgap; it was feared the Spanish fleet would bombard the US east coast.

The 20-inch Rodmans were only fired eight times in practice to determine the effect of the 1,080 lb (490 kg) projectiles. It was nearly impossible to find a target that would leave enough evidence to measure the effect of hits. The first four shots were fired with charges of 50, 75, 100, and 125 lb (57 kg) of gunpowder, reaching a bore pressure of 25,000 psi (170,000 kPa). Four more shots were fired in March 1867 with charges of 125, 150, 175, and 200 lb (91 kg) throwing the projectile 8,000 yd (7.3 km) with the barrel elevated to 25 degrees.

=== Rifled versions ===
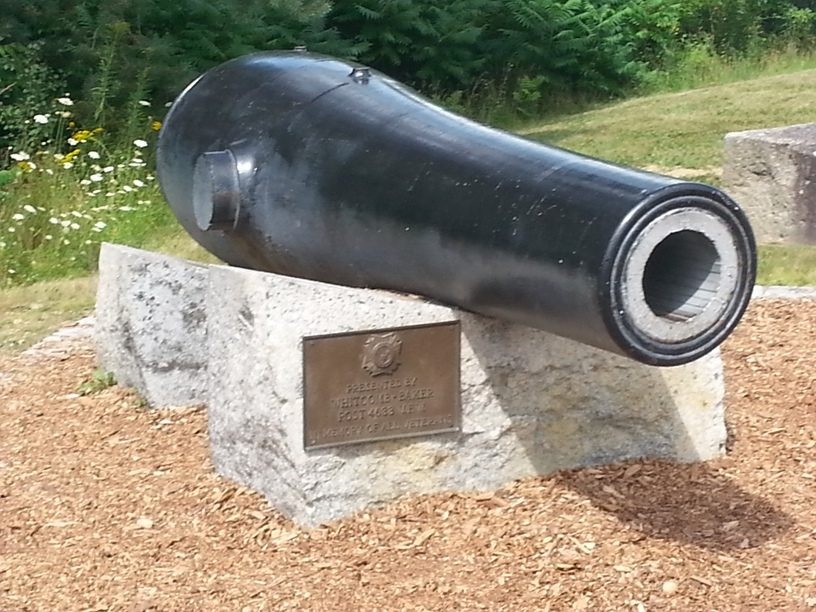
8-inch converted rifle, lined down from 10-inch smoothbore

During the War, and immediately after, attempts were made to cast rifled Rodman guns. Unsuccessful attempts were made to cast a 12-inch rifle in 1861, an 8-inch rifle in 1862, and another 12-inch rifle in 1868. However, Robert Parker Parrott at the Cold Spring Foundry, across the Hudson River from the United States Army Military Academy at West Point, used the Rodman water core method of casting to produce large-bore rifled guns in 200- and 300-pound models. Parrott rifles that had been cast using the Rodman method were inscribed with the initials WC in order to differentiate those guns from ones that had been cast using ordinary methods. Primarily these guns were used on naval vessels, especially large monitors. In the 1870s and 1880s, efforts focused on converting existing Rodman guns into rifles. 10-inch Rodman smoothbore guns were converted into 8-inch rifles. The first method used was inserting a wrought iron rifle sleeve through the muzzle; a similar steel sleeve was also used later. The last method involved drilling and tapping the breech of the 10-inch Rodman and inserting a rifled steel sleeve and screwing it in tight with a threaded breech plug. These breech-inserted guns are easily recognized by the square cascabel which was designed to provide purchase for screwing the breech plug and liner securely into the gun.

These conversions were not viewed favorably and were primarily seen as cheap stopgaps until modern breech-loading rifles could be developed and emplaced. However, the 8-inch converted rifle was widely deployed in fortifications constructed in the 1870s, and remained in service until 1905.

=== Confederate copies ===
In 1859 Joseph R. Anderson of the Tredegar Iron Works in Richmond, Virginia, and Junius L. Archer of the Bellona Foundry in Midlothian, Virginia (the only two gun foundries then operating in what would become the Confederacy), failed to adopt the Rodman technique of hollow casting, and as result the US Army cancelled contracts with both firms for casting columbiads. Therefore, at the outbreak of the war, southern foundries were not capable of casting guns using the Rodman method.

The Confederates used solid cast 8-inch and 10-inch columbiads that resemble Rodman guns. A closer examination of these Confederate columbiads reveals that they have a straighter cylindrical contour between the trunnions and the breech as opposed to the sweeping continuous curve of the Rodman gun. The Confederate columbiads have longer trunnions that were intended for use with heavy wooden carriages. The Union gun were designed to be mounted in iron carriages with thinner cheeks, permitting shorter trunnions. The exteriors of the Confederate columbiads are rough, not having been finished on a lathe as were their Union counterparts.

On November 14, 1864, and February 20, 1865, at the Tredegar Iron Works, Anderson cast two 12-inch columbiads using the Rodman method. The guns were made too late and were never finished or mounted.

== Similar weapons ==
The 3-inch ordnance rifle and the 4.5-inch siege rifle were frequently misidentified as Rodmans. Neither gun was hollow cast. The 3-inch ordnance rifle was made of hammer-welded wrought iron, and the 4.5-inch siege rifle was conventionally cast.

This error was not limited to those ignorant of artillery; in November 1864 Brig. Gen. John Milton Brannan, chief of artillery in the Union Department of the Cumberland, described the armament of the Chattanooga forts as including several 3-inch and 4.5-inch Rodman guns. First Lieutenant Henry S. Hurter of the 1st Minnesota Light Artillery Battery wrote in his report to Oscar Malmros, Adjutant General for the State of Minnesota, "On the 5th of March captain Clayton exchanged the old guns, two 12-pound howitzers, and two 6-pound rifled guns, caliber 3.67, for four new rifled 3-inch Rodman's guns." The letter was written on November 11, 1864, in Georgia.

== Gallery ==
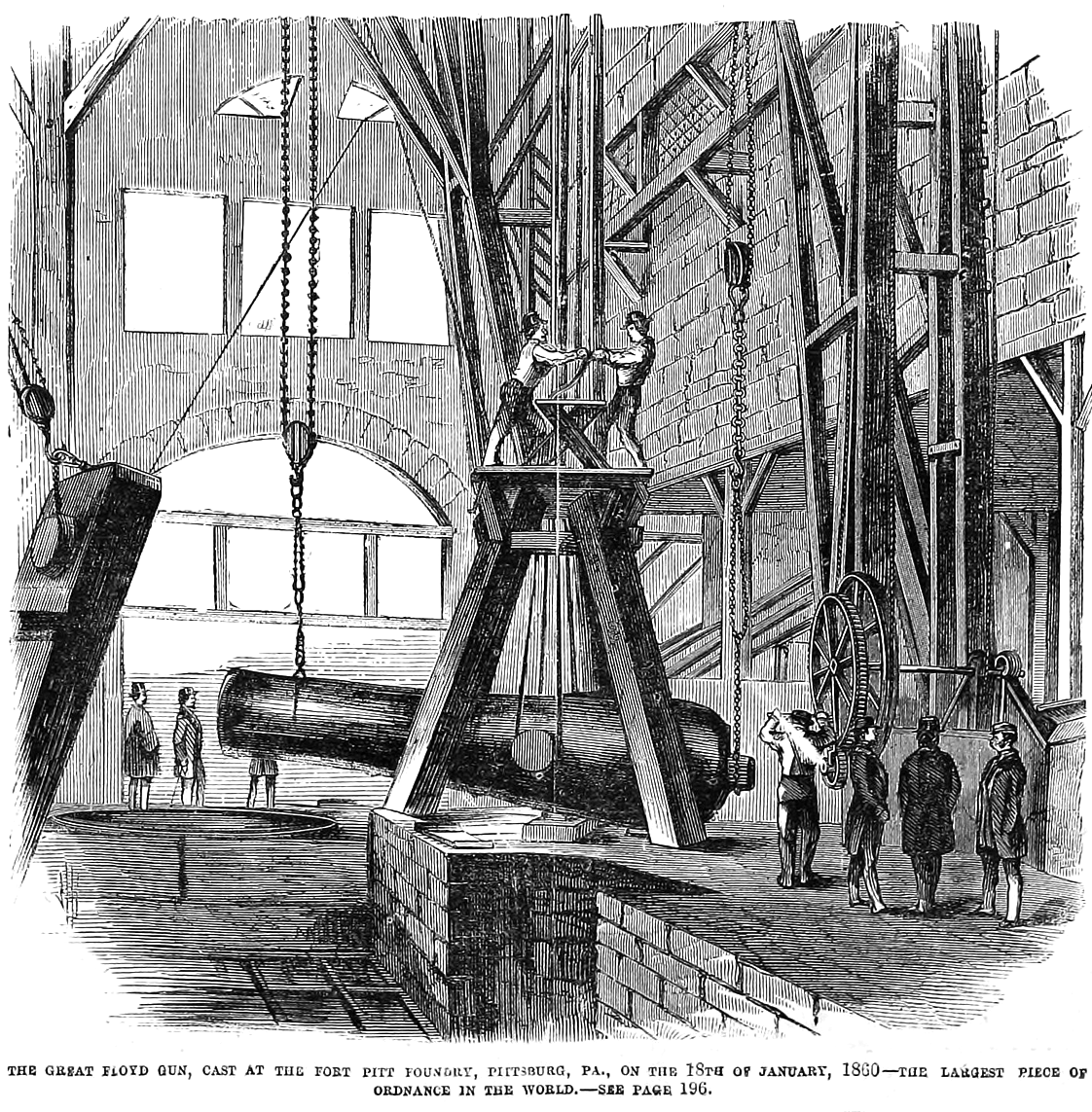
The 15-inch Rodman Gun (better known as the Floyd Gun) in 1860 at the Fort Pitt Foundry, Pittsburg, Pa.

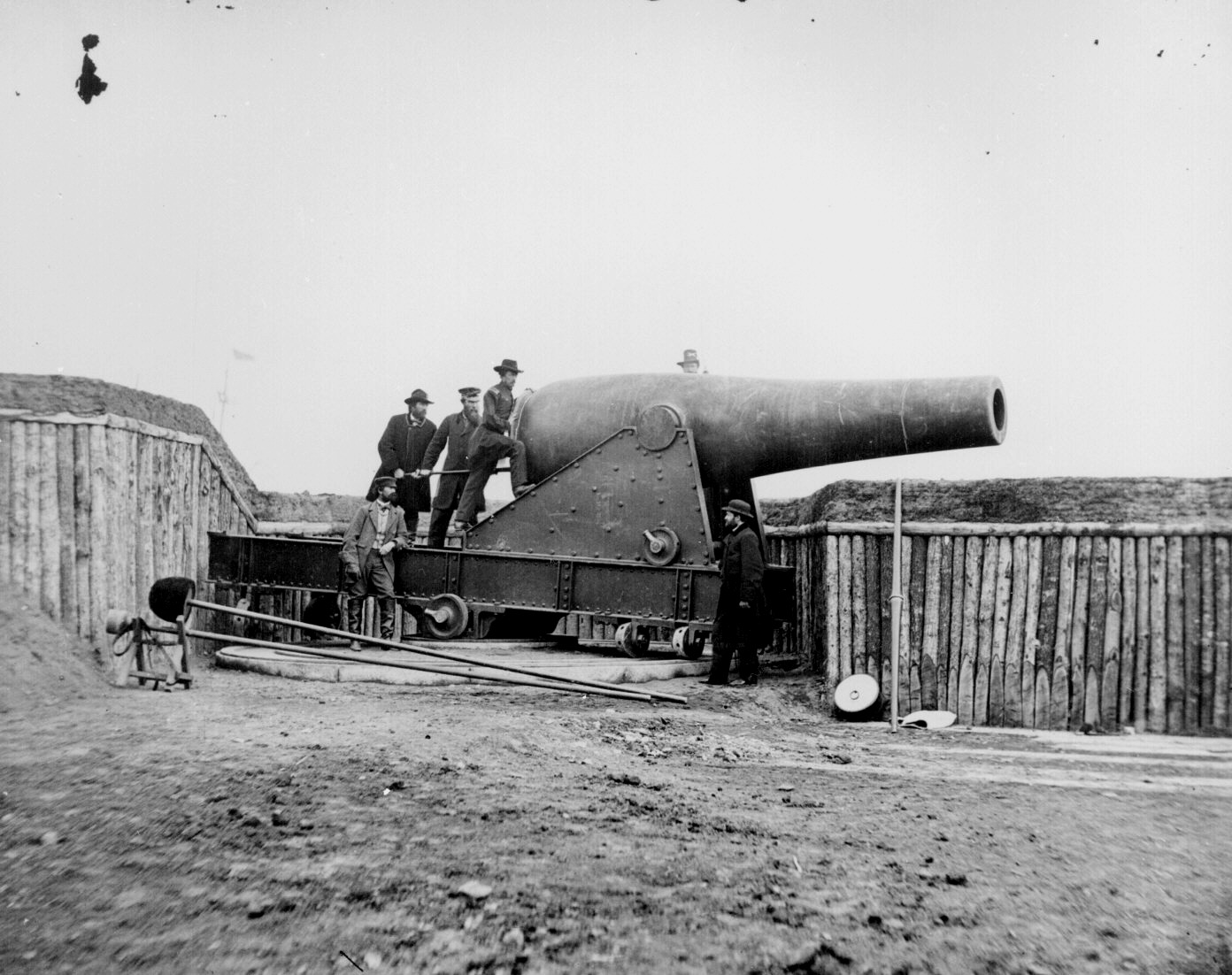
Photograph of the 15-inch Rodman gun at Battery Rodgers, Alexandria, Virginia.

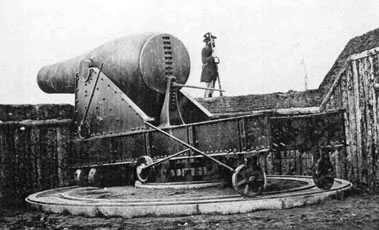
Another photograph of the 15-inch Rodman gun at Battery Rodgers. This photograph gives an excellent view of the elevation mechanism and the center-pintle carriage.

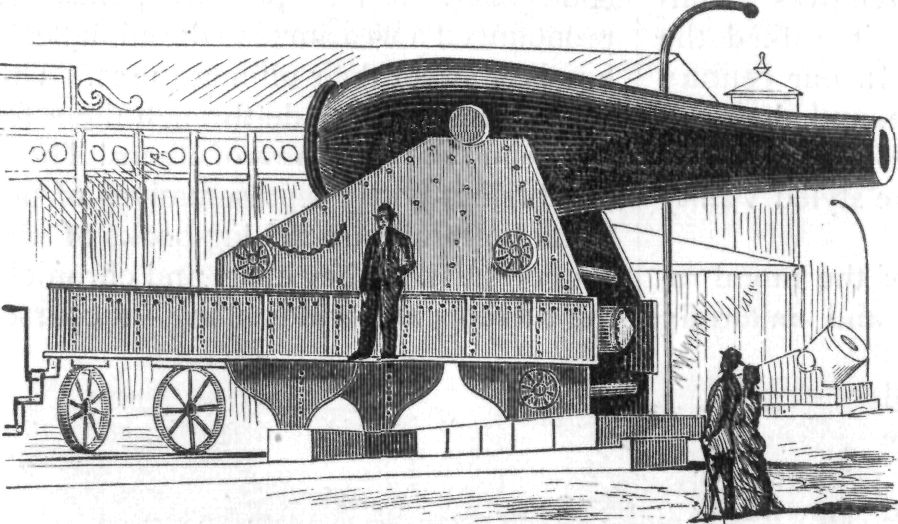
20-inch Rodman gun at the Centennial Exposition in Philadelphia, 1876. Hollow casting and the large guns that could be produced using the method were considered showpieces of American technology.

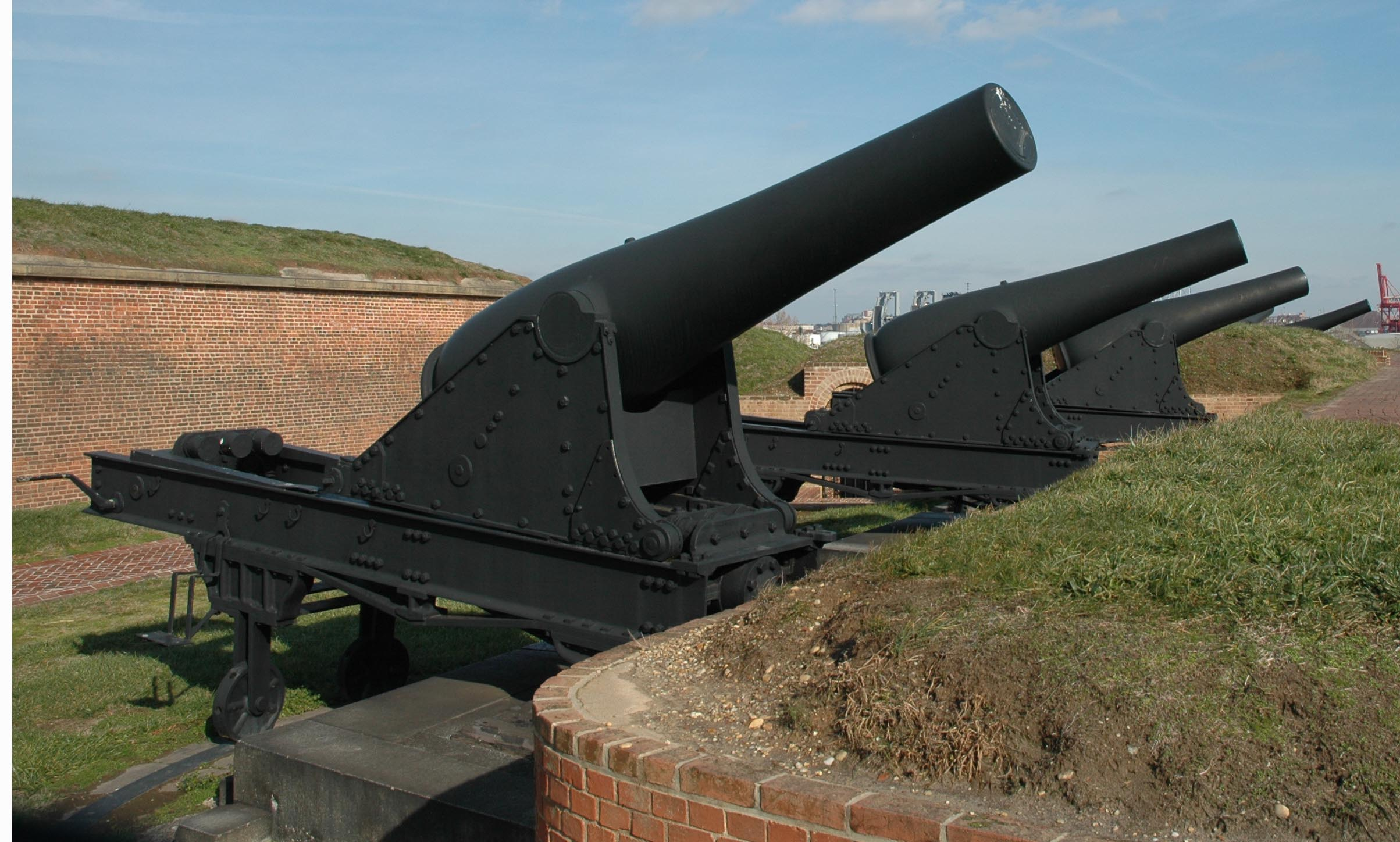
8-inch Rodman converted rifles at Fort McHenry, Maryland. They are mounted on post-war front pintle carriages.

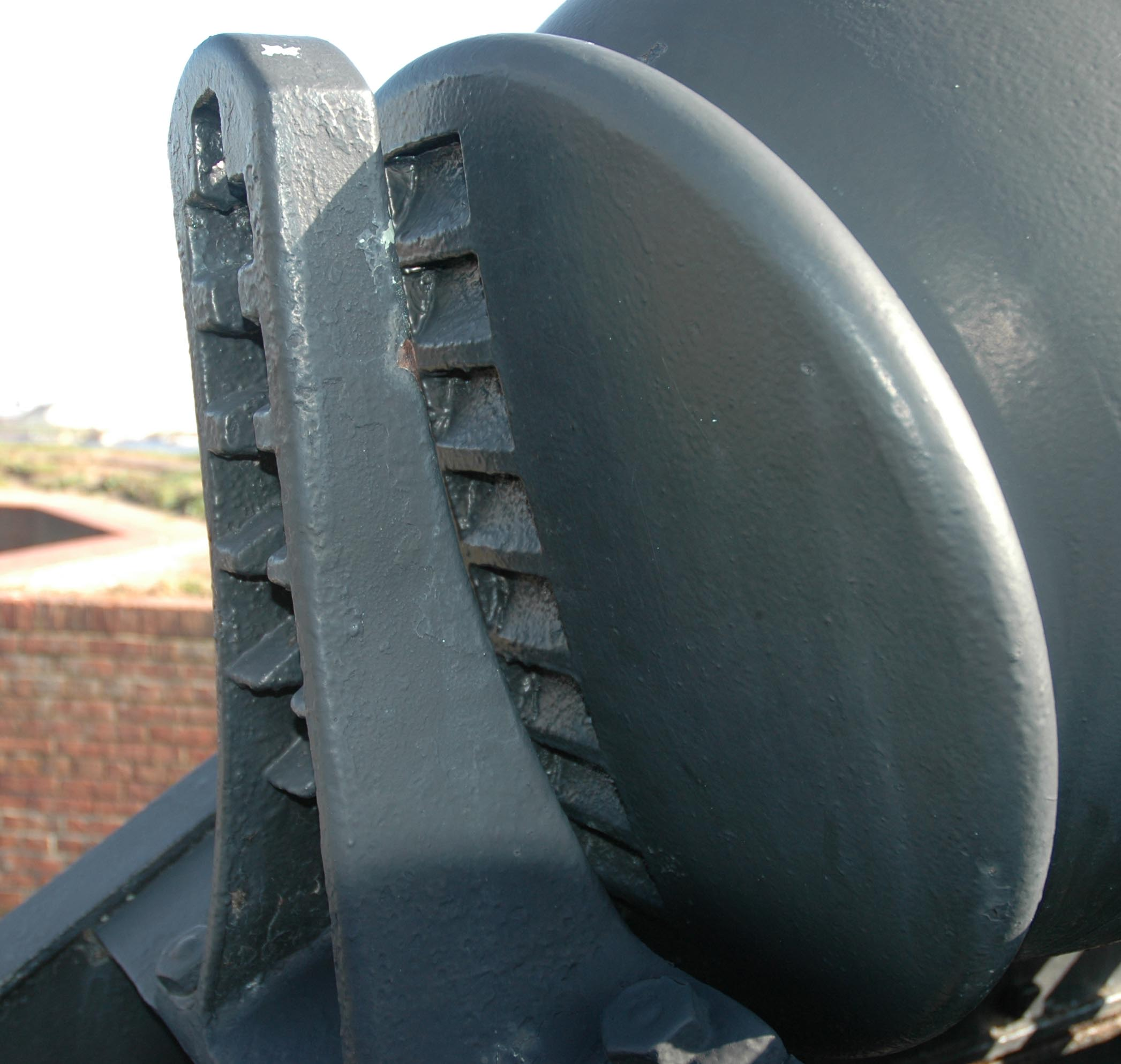
Photograph of cascabel of an 8-inch Rodman converted rifle at Fort McHenry showing elevation ratchets used in earliest guns and the ratchet post.

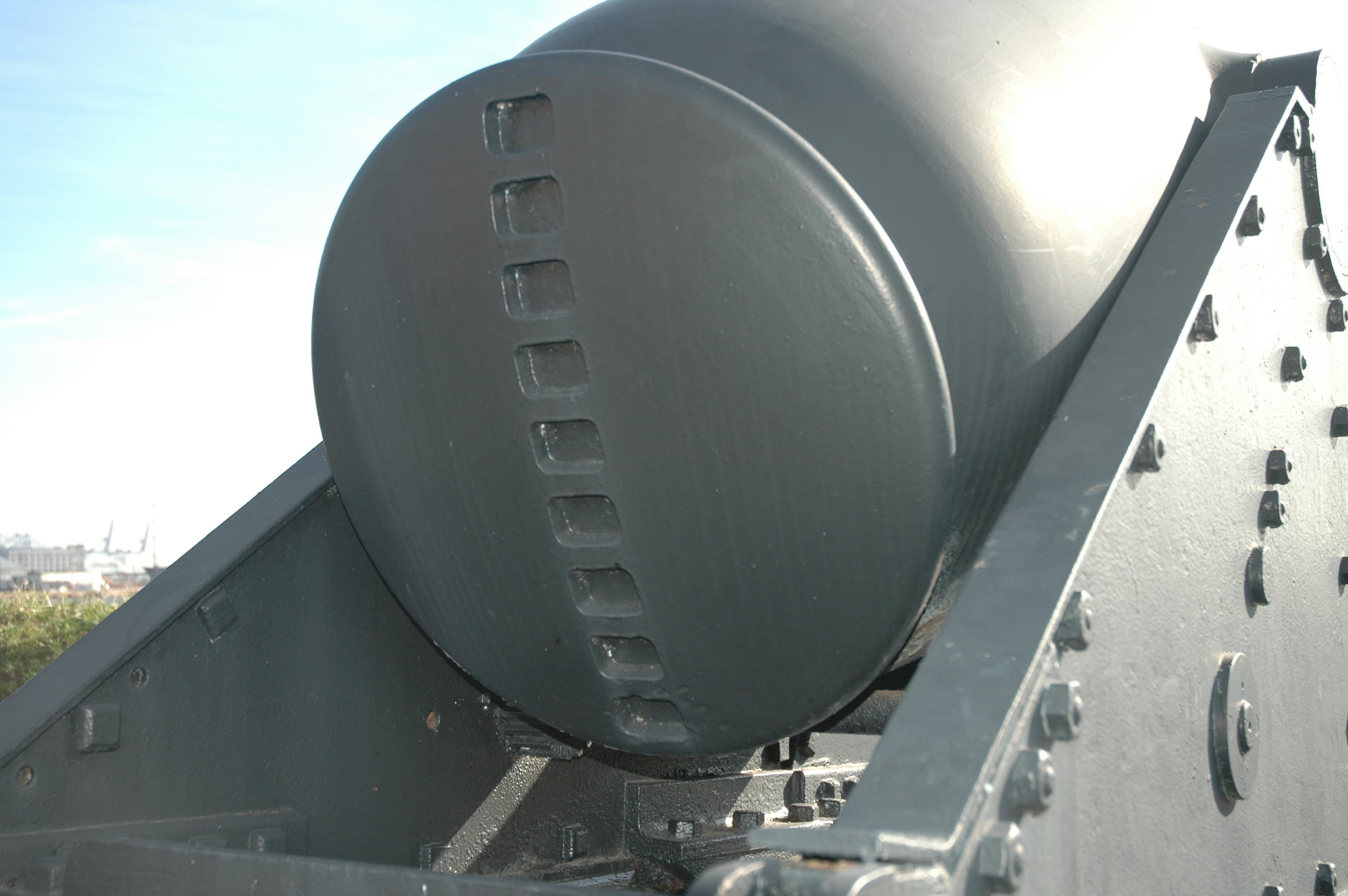
Photograph of cascabel of an 8-inch Rodman converted rifle at Fort McHenry showing elevation sockets used in later guns. The ratchet post is missing on this gun.

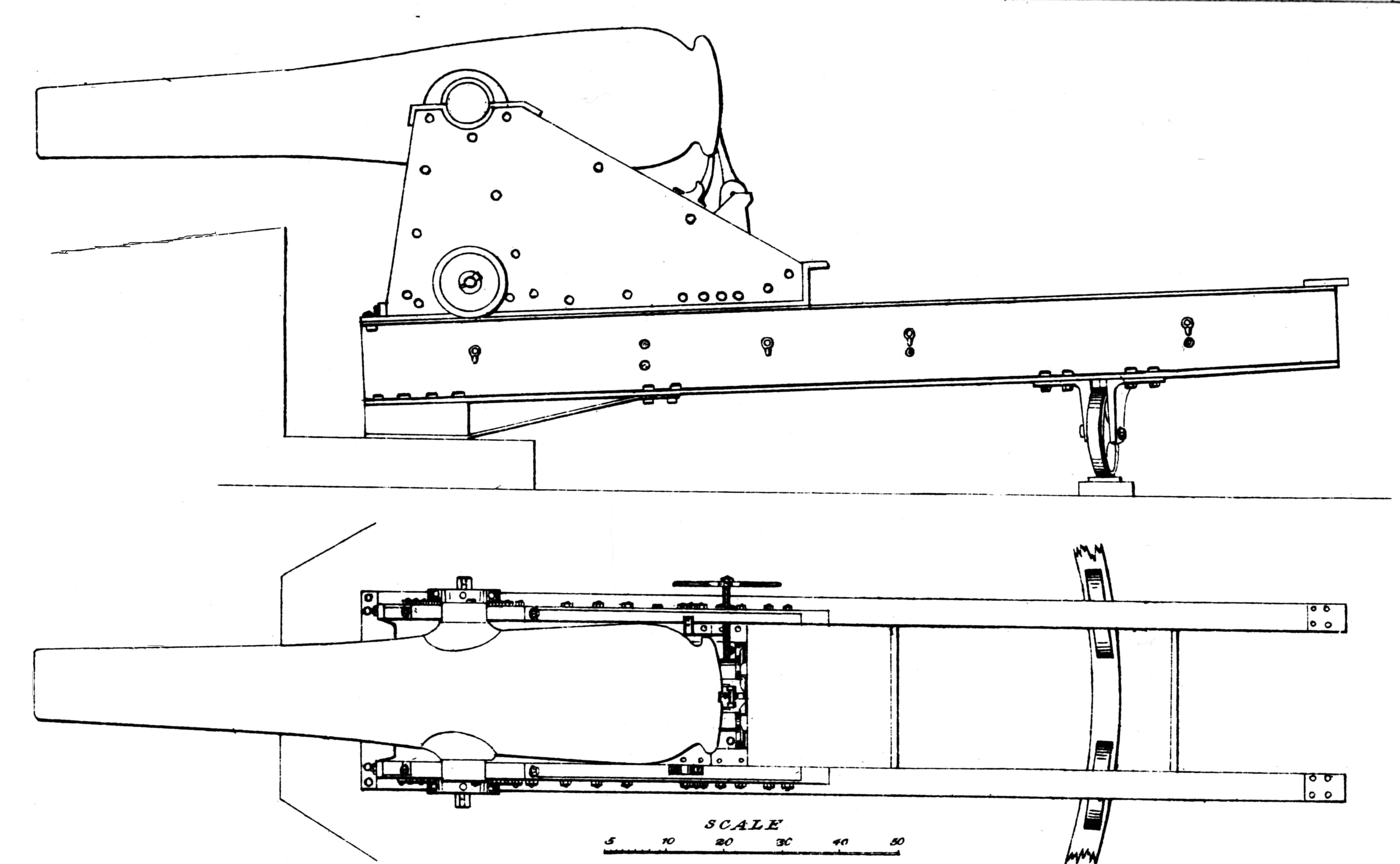
Period drawing of Rodman gun on a front-pintle barbette carriage

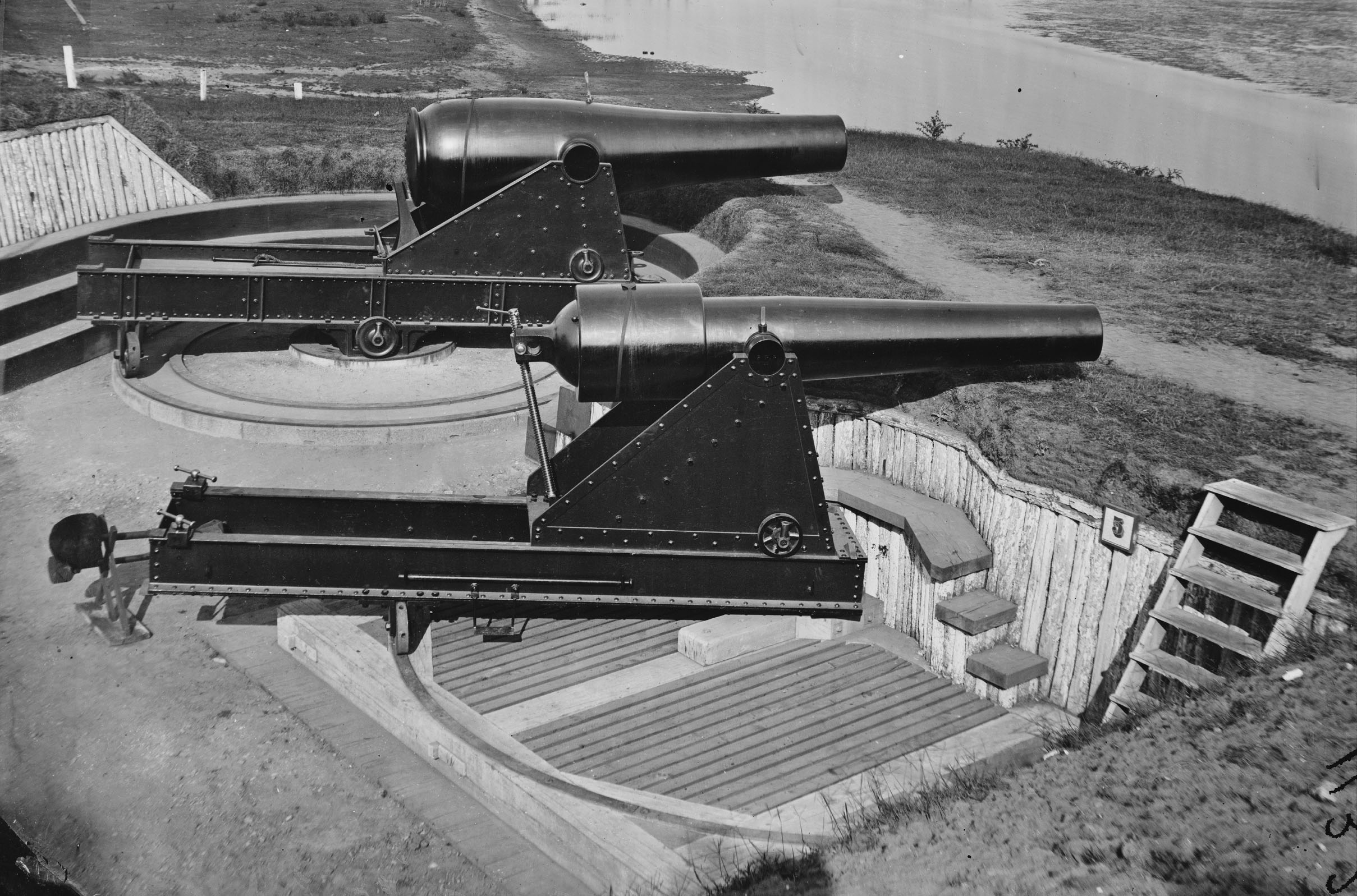
Period photograph of Battery Rodgers Alexandria, Virginia showing a 15-inch Rodman gun mounted on a center-pintle barbette carriage (rear) and an 8-inch (200-pounder) Parrott rifle mounted on a front-pintle barbette carriage (front). The 8-inch Parrott rifle used the same carriage as the 10-inch Rodman gun.

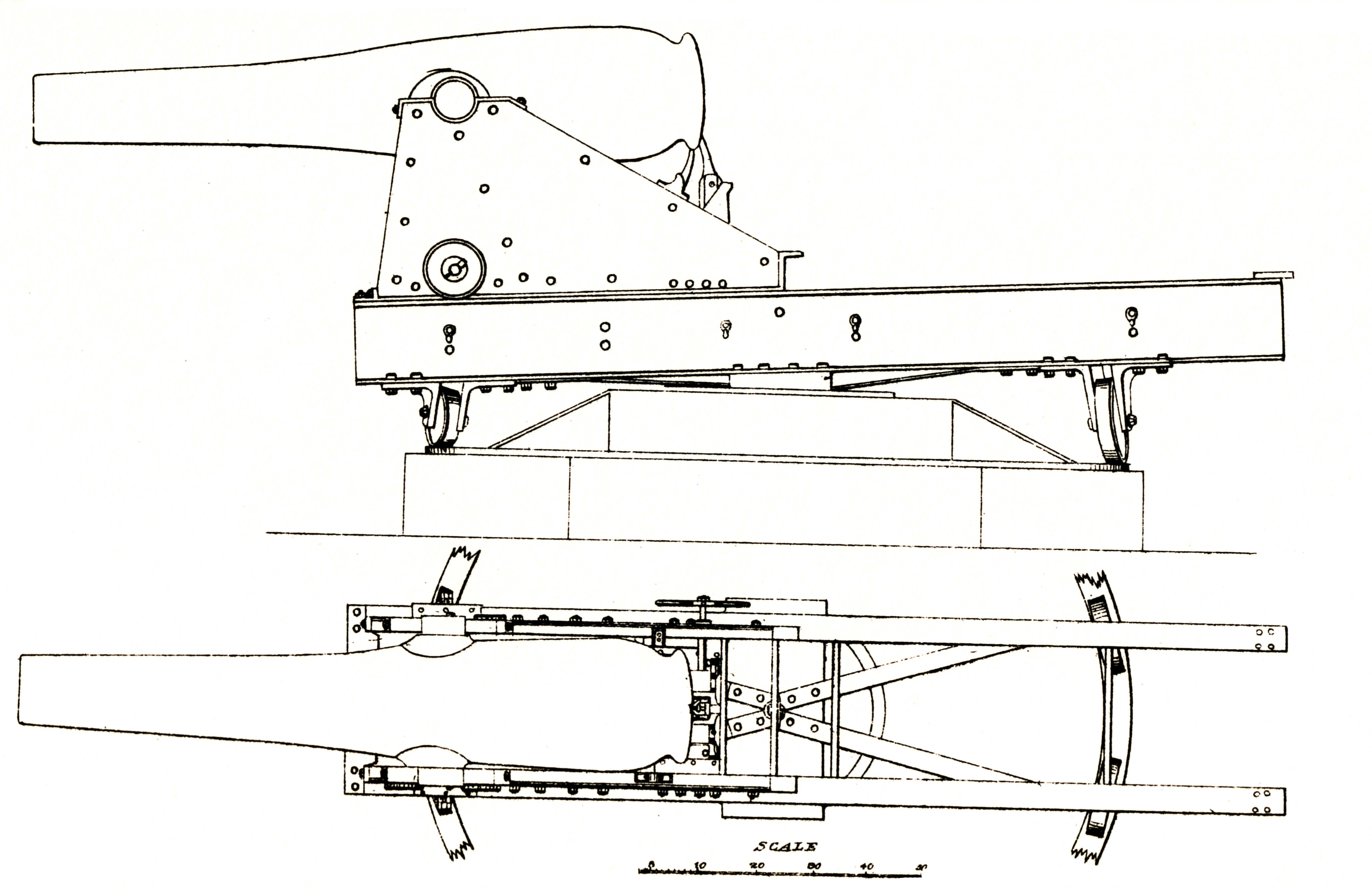
Period drawing of Rodman gun on a center-pintle barbette carriage.

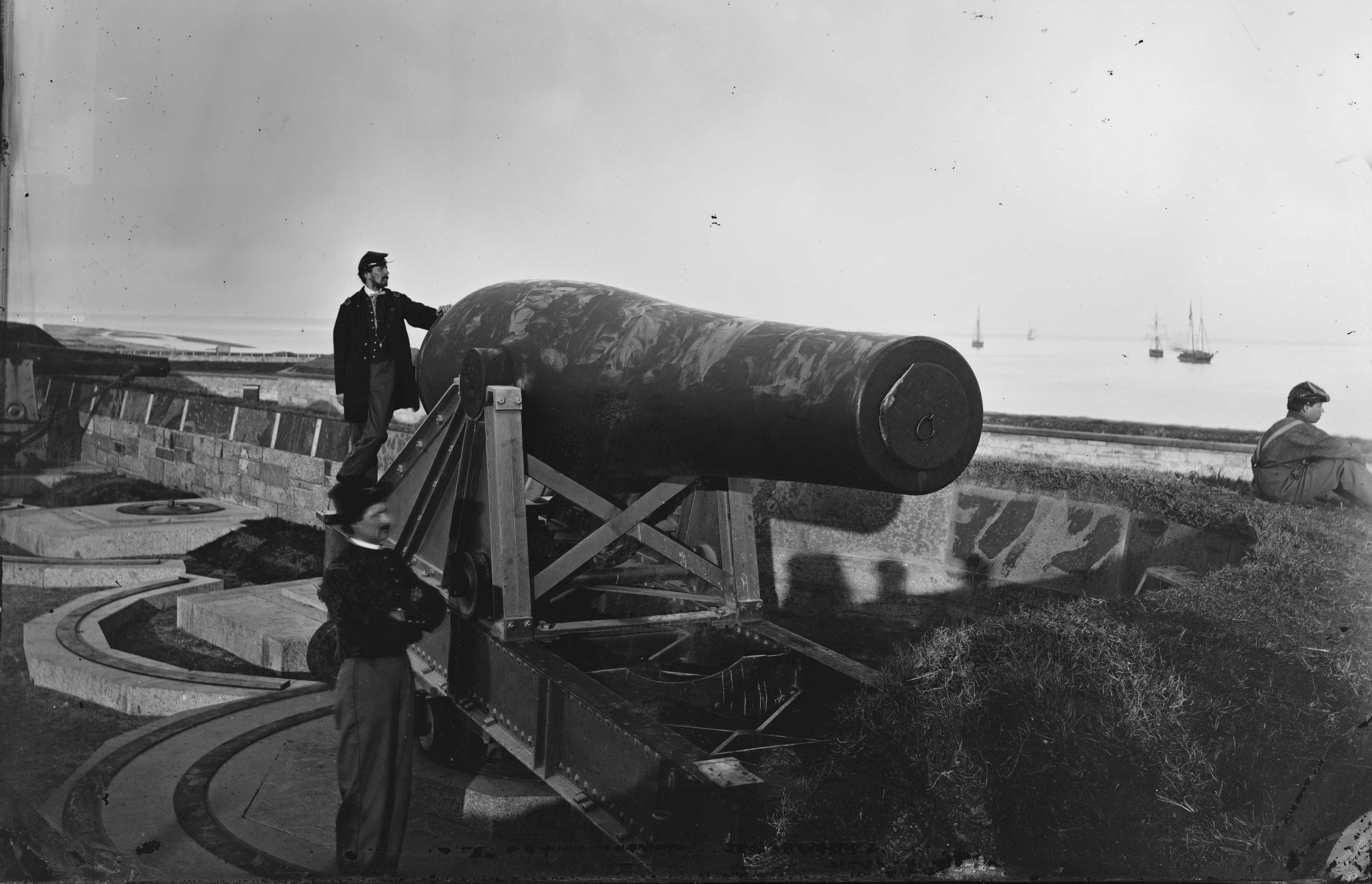
Period photograph of a 15-inch Rodman gun mounted on a center-pintle barbette carriage at Fort Monroe, Virginia.

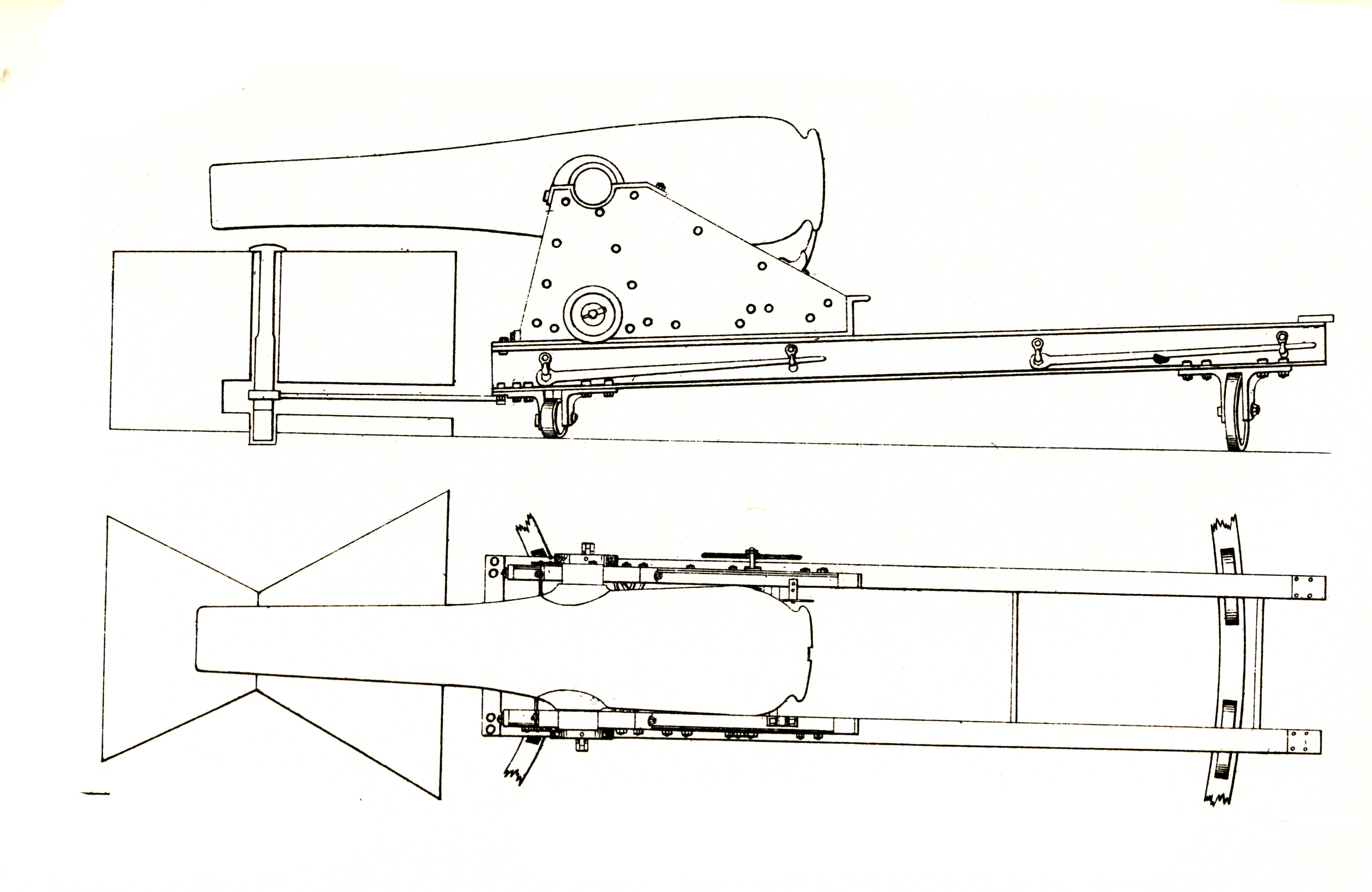
Period drawing of a Rodman gun on a casemate carriage.

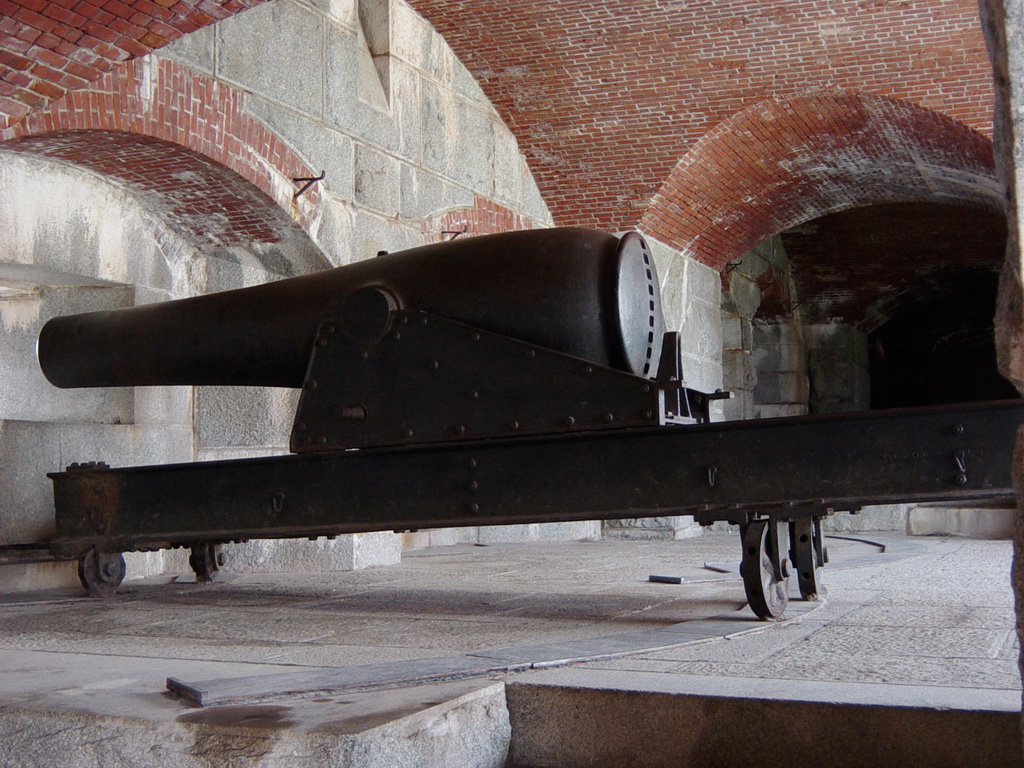
Photograph of a Rodman gun on a casemate carriage in Fort Knox, Maine.

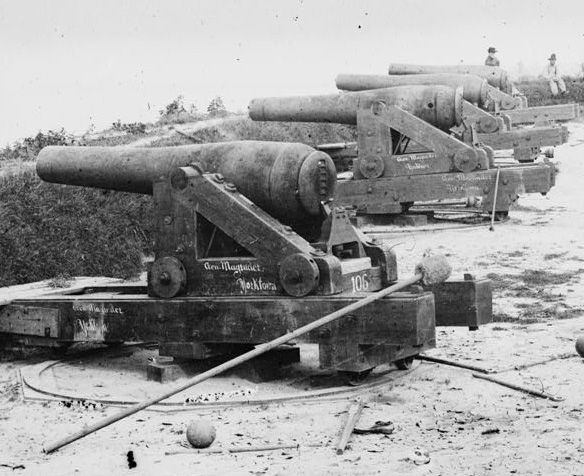
8-inch Confederate columbiads at Yorktown, Virginia.

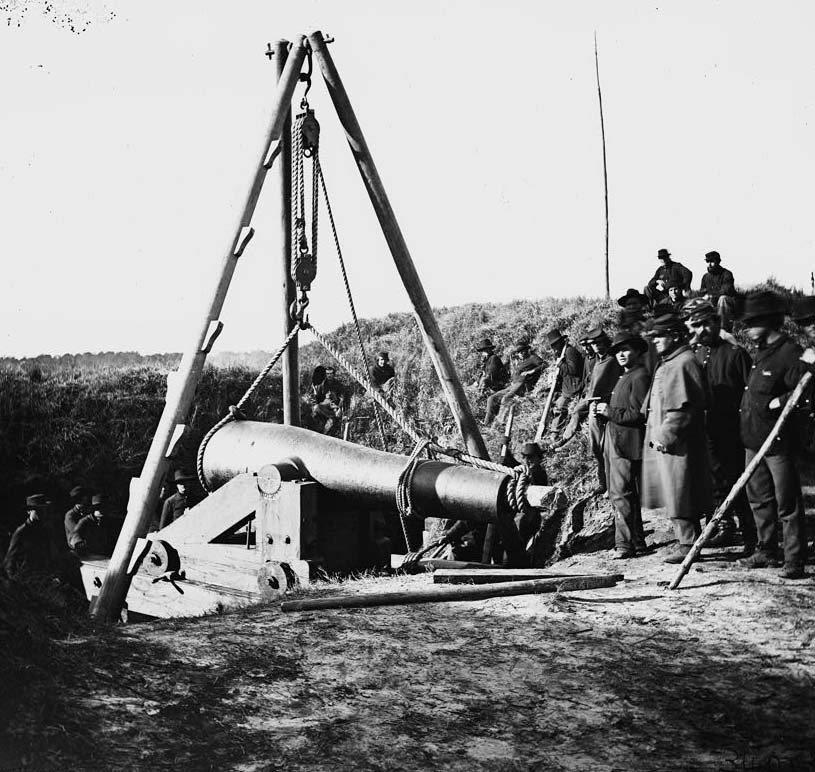
Union troops removing an 8-inch Confederate columbiad from Fort McAllister, Georgia.

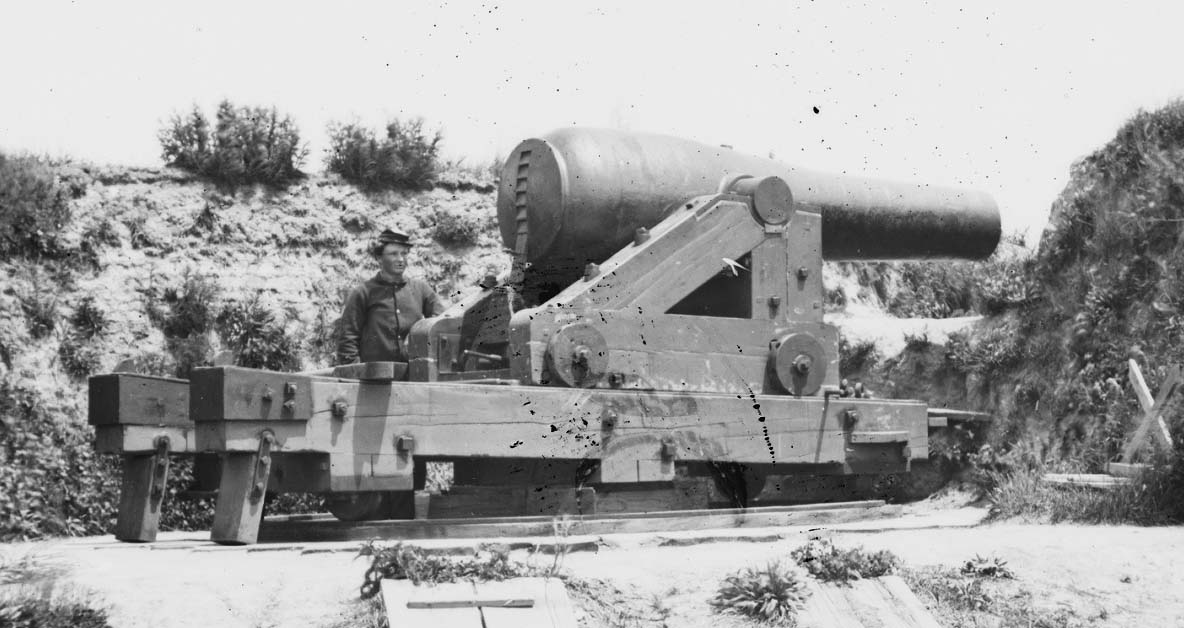
10-inch Confederate columbiad at Fort Darling, Virginia.

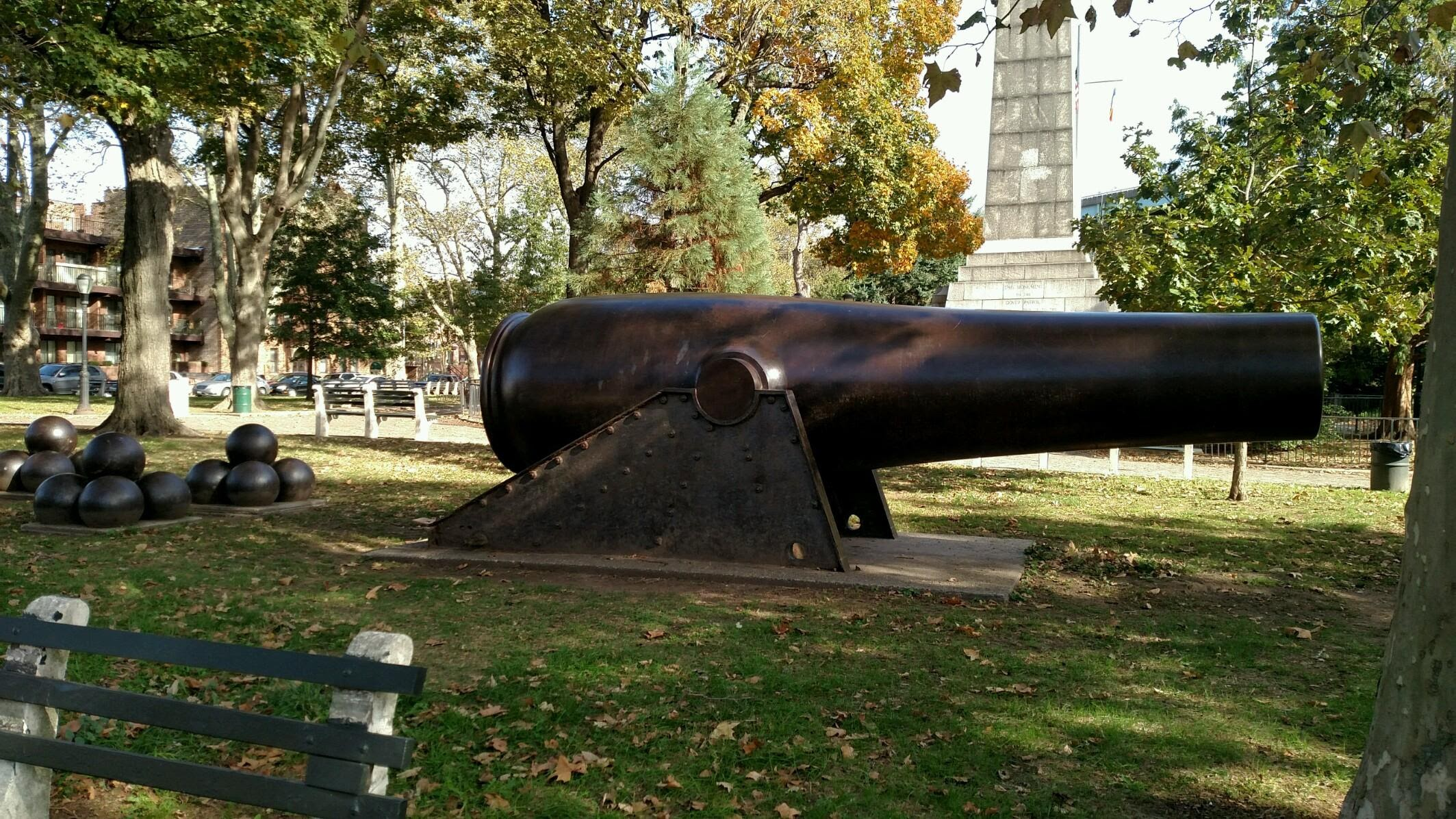
20-inch Rodman gun at John Paul Jones Park near Fort Hamilton, Brooklyn, New York.

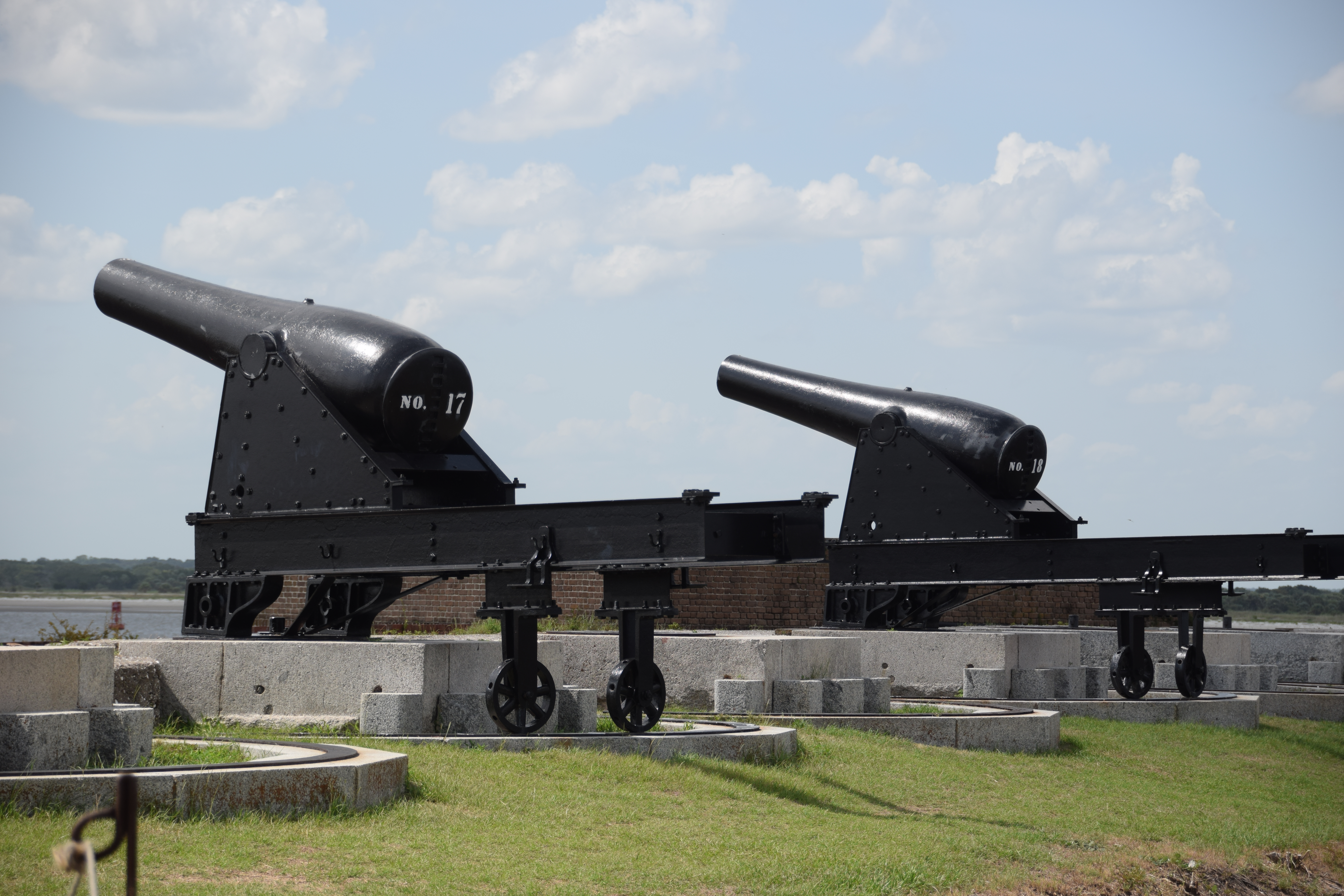
Rodman guns at Fort Clinch, Florida

== See also ==
- Parrott rifle
- Seacoast defense in the United States
- Siege artillery in the American Civil War
- USS Princeton (1843)
