= Fort Clinch =

- U.S. National Register of Historic Places
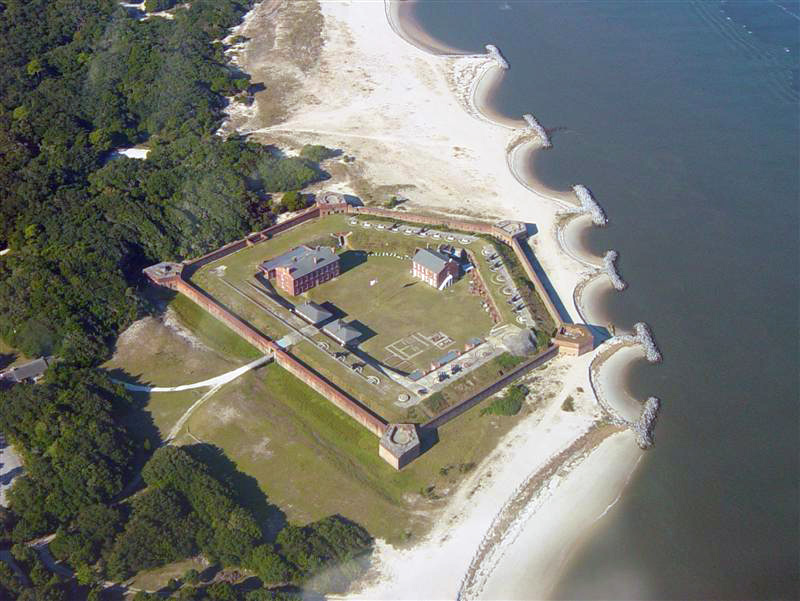
- Fort Clinch aerial view, October 2003
- Location: Amelia Island, Nassau County, Florida
- Coordinates: 30°42′16.88″N 81°27′16.06″W
- Built: 1847-1869
- Architectural style: Brick Masonry
- Visitation: 167,000 (an average year)
- NRHP reference No.: 72000343
- Added to NRHP: November 15, 1972

Fort Clinch is a 19th-century masonry coastal fortification, built as part of the Third System of seacoast defense conceived by the United States. It is located on a peninsula near the northernmost point of Amelia Island in Nassau County, Florida. The fort lies to the northeast of Fernandina Beach at the entrance to the Cumberland Sound, in the northeast part of the state. Today it is included within the boundaries of Fort Clinch State Park.

== History ==
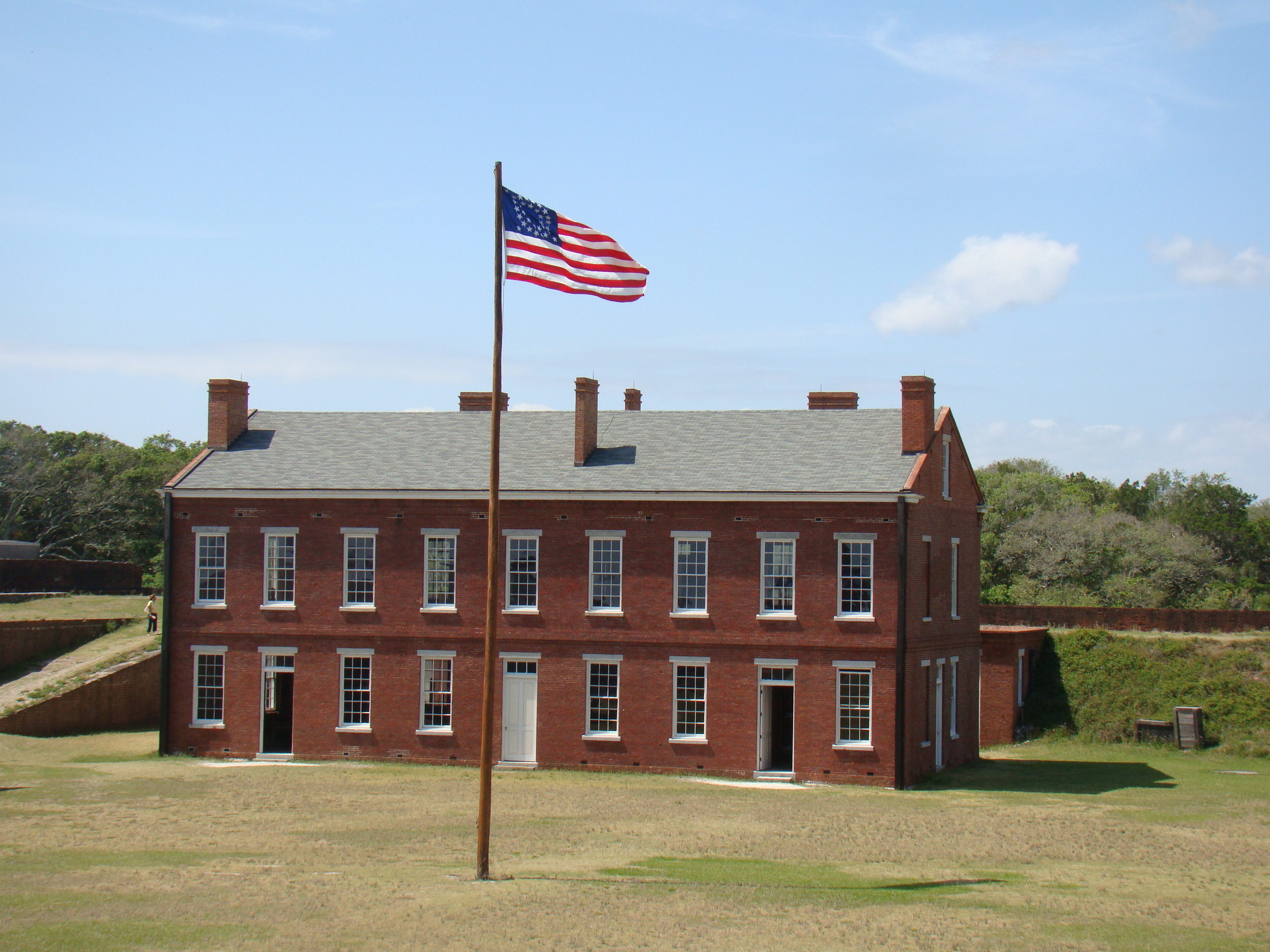
Fort Clinch

This site was first fortified in 1736 by the Spanish, when they held colonies in Florida. From 1736, various nations to control the territory have garrisoned and fortified this site to protect the entrance to the St. Marys River and Cumberland Sound.

After the end of the Second Seminole War, the United States started construction of a fort, later named Fort Clinch, in 1847. It was part of its Third System of coastal defenses conceived earlier in the century, which guided fortifications throughout this period. The fortified compound is pentagonal in shape, with both inner and outer walls, and consists of almost five million bricks. There are corner bastions and embrasures in the outer walls and several structures in the interior courtyards, including a two-story barracks. The fort was named in honor of General Duncan Lamont Clinch after his death in 1849. General Clinch fought in the War of 1812 and was an important figure in the First and Second Seminole Wars.

Confederate forces seized the fort in early 1861. It was used as a safe haven for Confederate blockade runners during the first year of the Civil War. However, changes in technology, specifically the development of rifled cannon, had improved weaponry to the point that the fort's brick walls were vulnerable to attacks and thus obsolete. In March 1862 General Robert E. Lee ordered abandonment of the fort in order to use scarce troops in other areas. Afterwards Federal troops re-occupied the fort, taking control of the adjacent Georgia and Florida coasts. They used the fort as the base of Union operations in the area throughout the Civil War.

The fort was placed on caretaker status in 1869; it remained so until 1898, when the Army garrisoned it during the short Spanish–American War. In September of that year, the Army abandoned it again. The fort gradually deteriorated.

During the Great Depression, workers of the Civilian Conservation Corps (CCC) began restoration of the fort during the 1930s. It was restored to the Civil War era. In 1935, the State of Florida bought 256 acres (1.0 km^{2}) that included the then-abandoned fort and the surrounding area. Fort Clinch State Park including the fort, opened to the public in 1938.

The fort was closed to the public during World War II and used as a communications and security post. It was re-opened to public visits after the war ended.

The fort was placed on the National Register of Historic Places in 1972. It is interpreted largely in terms of its use as a base of Union operations during the American Civil War. State Park personnel reenact military life at the fort, which is open from 8:00am until sundown, year-round.

== Recreational activities ==
Fort Clinch has a living history program. Visitors can interact with and learn from reenactors who dress in period-appropriate fashion and portray individuals who lived in the 1860s. On the first weekend of every month a soldier garrison fires cannons and demonstrates other battlefield skills.

== Photos ==
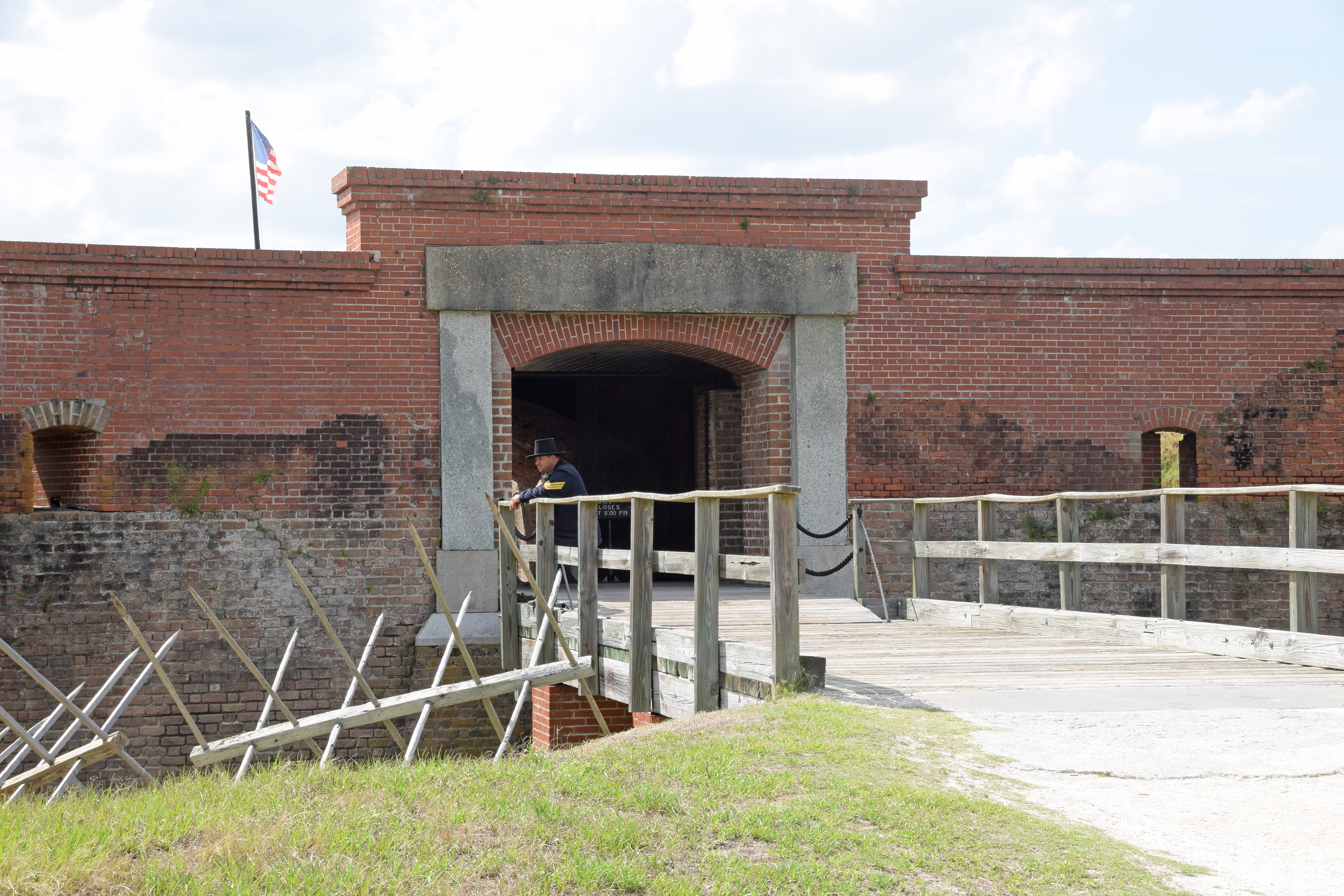
The entrance (2015)

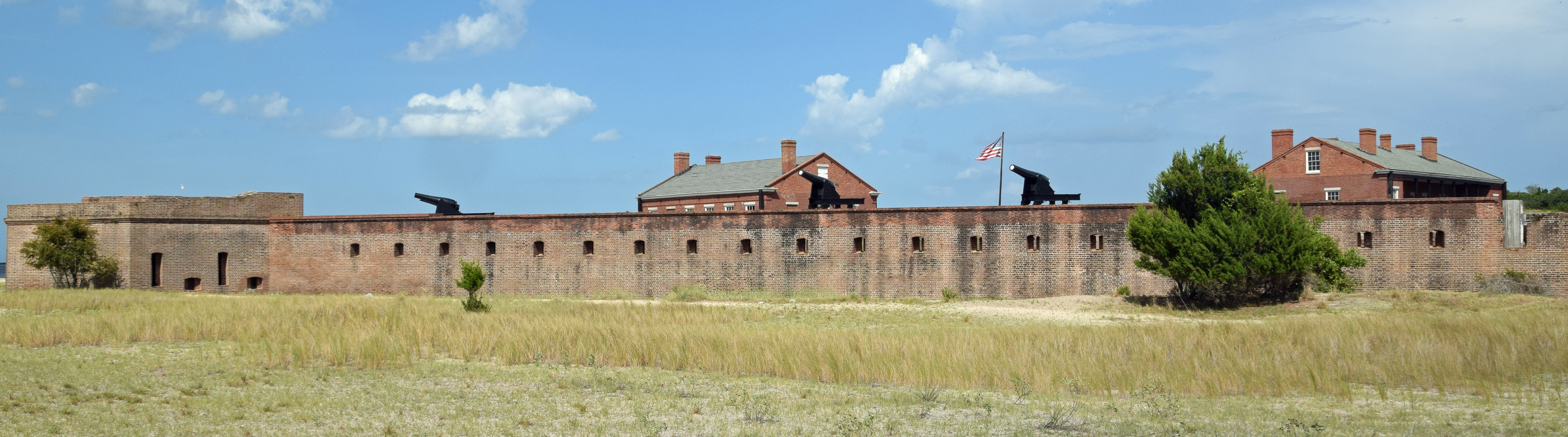
One of the walls facing Cumberland Sound

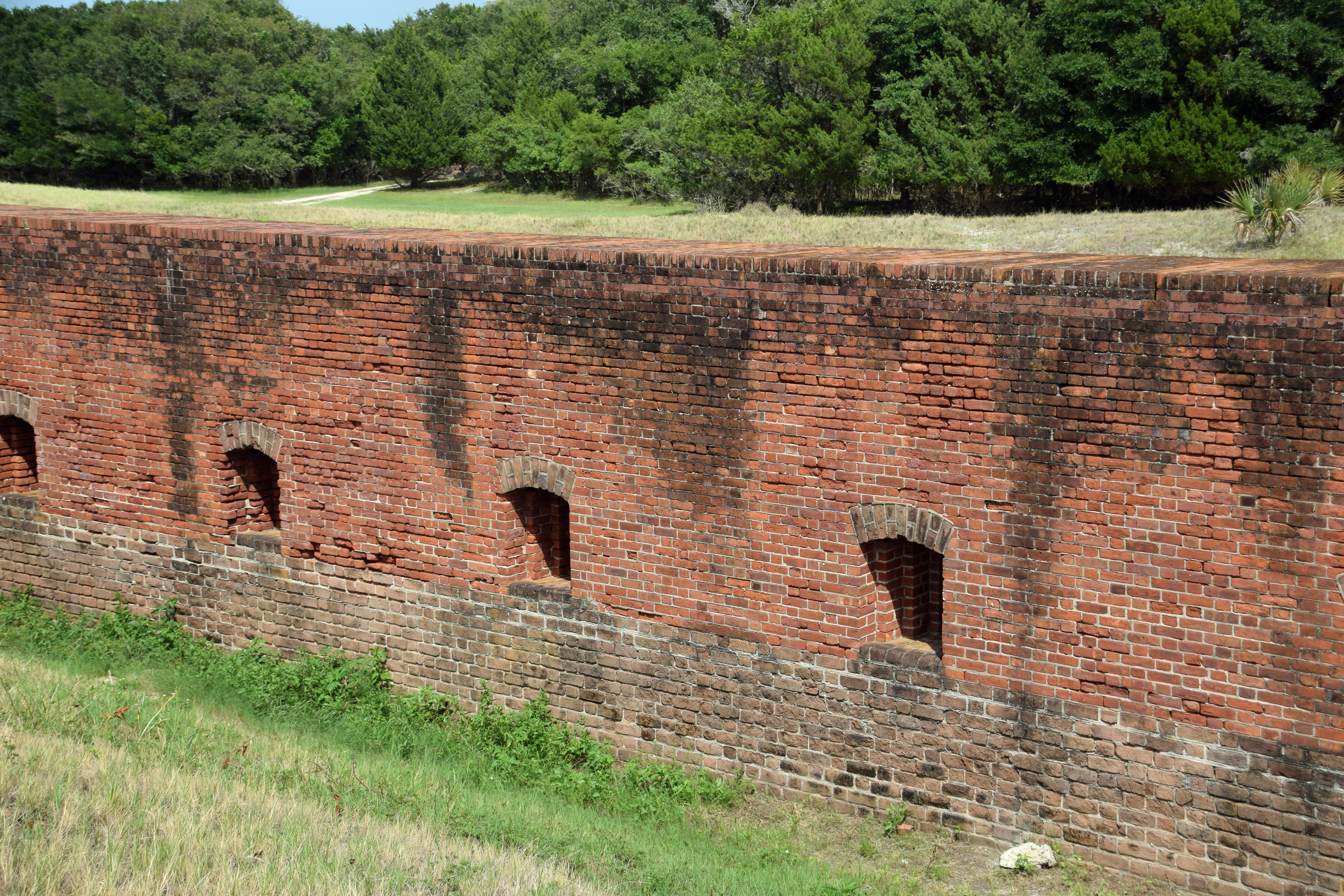
An inner wall (2015)

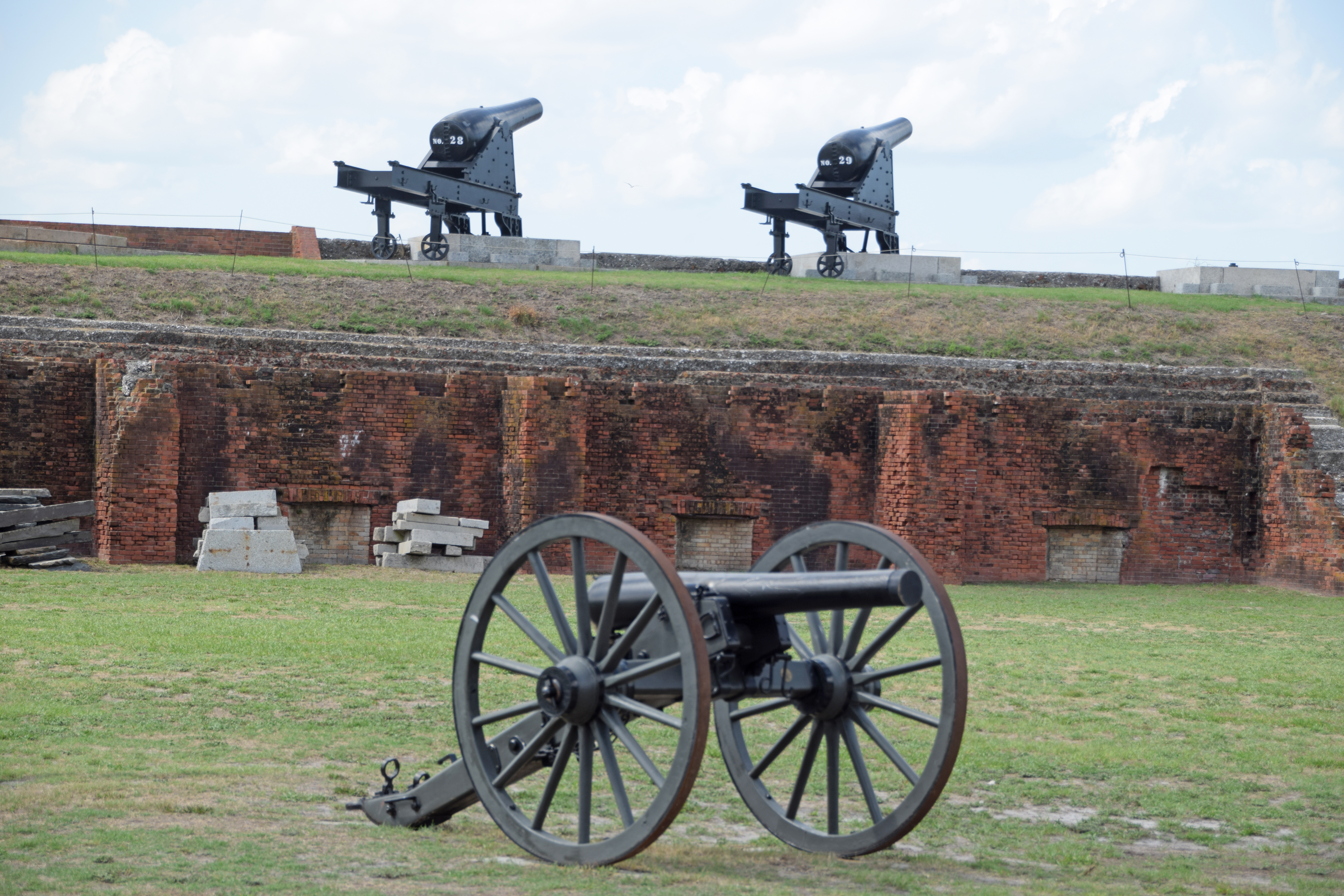
Cannons inside the fort

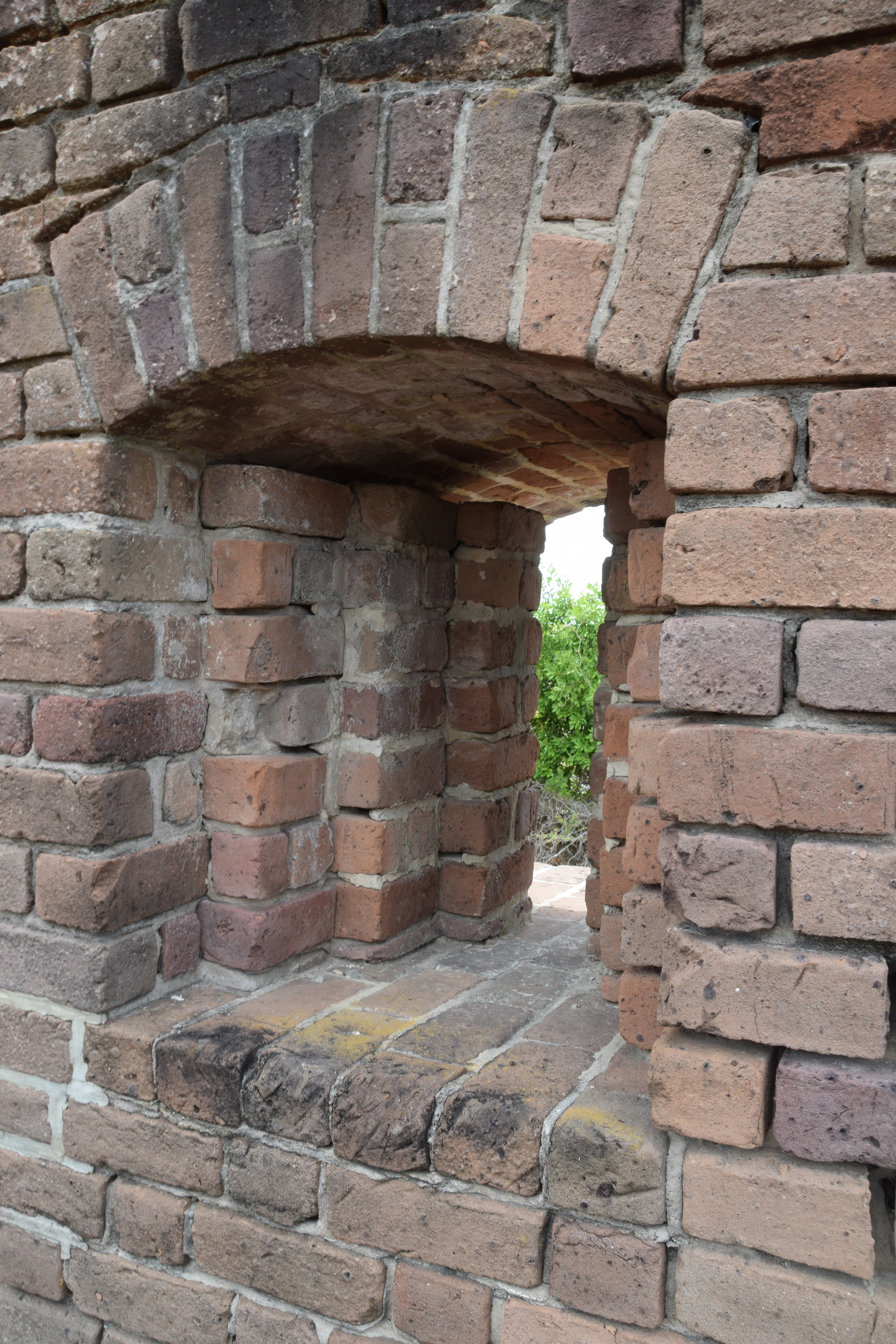
A window for firing a rifle
