= Cascabel (artillery) =

Subassembly of a muzzle-loading cannon

An illustration of the breech of a cannon, with components of the cascabel subassembly labeled: A = knob, B = neck, C = filet, D = breech base.

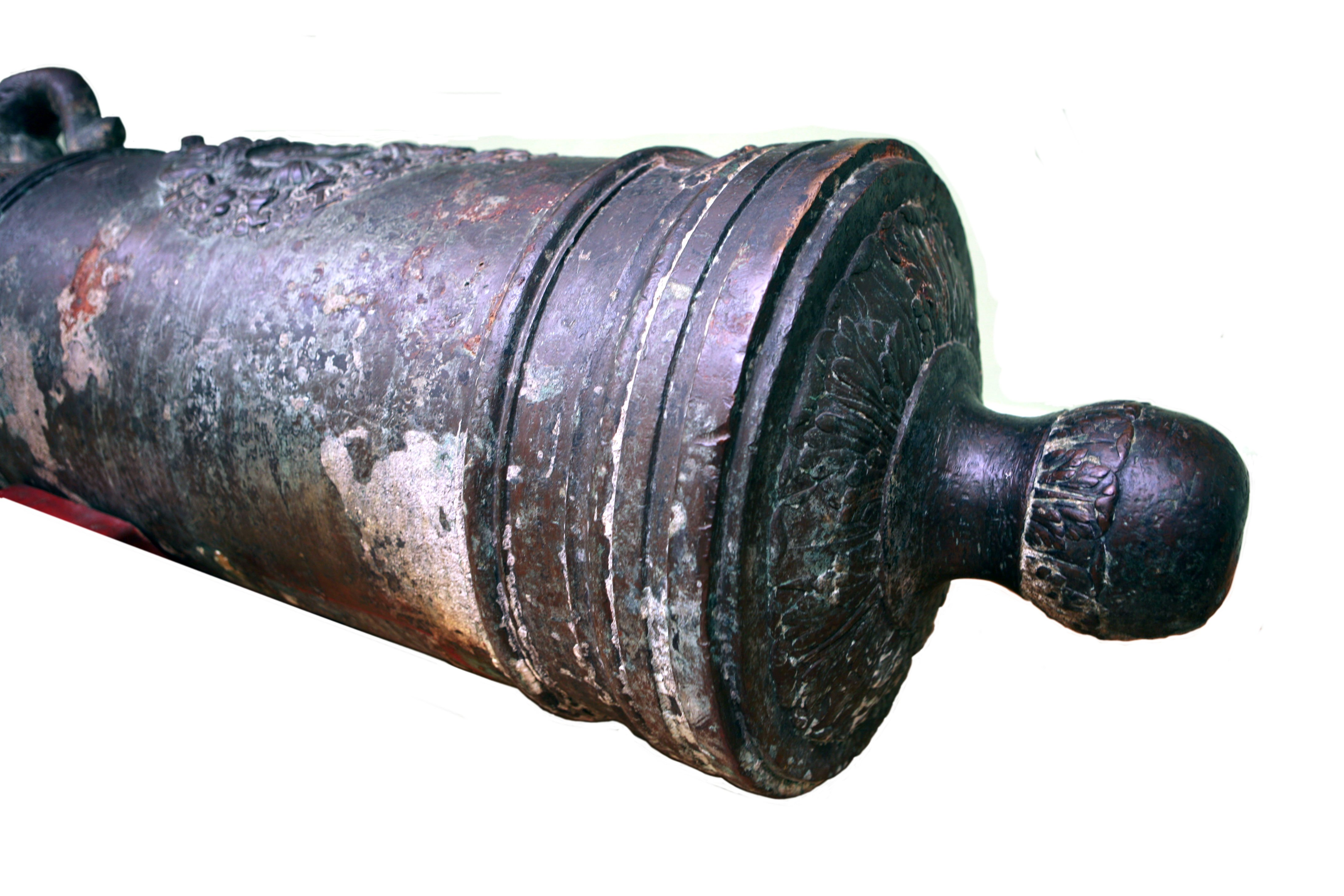
Cascabel on a French naval cannon

A cascabel is a subassembly of a muzzle-loading cannon, a knob to which to attach arresting ropes to deal with the recoil of firing the cannon.

== Description ==
A cannon's cascabel comprises the knob (A) and the neck (B), with some models also having a filet (C). By some definitions the cascabel additionally includes the base of the breech (D). Cascabels varied in design and appearance, and were a common feature of cannons from the 17th century until the advent of the breech loading cannon in the late 19th century. Many naval guns had a heavy metal loop on the cascabel, the pomellion, through which a wide rope was passed.

Bronze cascabels from captured guns have been used to make Victoria Cross medals. It was long thought that Russian guns captured during the Siege of Sevastopol were used, but this has been shown not to be so.
