= Ricochet (disambiguation) =

A ricochet is a rebound, bounce or skip off a surface.

Ricochet may also refer to:

== Ballistics ==
- Ricochet firing, firing of artillery at a low angle so as to cause the shells to skip across the ground

== People ==
- Ricochet (musician) (born Alexander Aksyonov; 1964–2007), Russian singer-songwriter, leader of post-punk band Obyekt Nasmeshek
- Ricochet (wrestler) (born 1988), American professional wrestler

== Books and comics ==
- Ricochet (comics), a Marvel Comics superhero
- Ricochet (Image Comics), an Image Comics Freak Force superhero
- Ricochet (Transformers), several fictional characters in the Transformers universe
- Ricochet, a 2006 novel by Sandra Brown

== Film and TV ==
- Ricochet (1963 film), a British crime film directed by John Moxey
- Ricochet (documentary), a music documentary about David Bowie
- Ricochets (1986 film), an Israeli film set during the 1982 Lebanon war.
- Ricochet (1991 film), a crime-thriller film by Russell Mulcahy
- Ricochet (TV production company), a British independent TV production company
- "Ricochet" (Suspects), a 2015 television episode
- "Ricochet" (Thunderbirds), a 1966 television episode

== Games ==
- Ricochet (1989 video game), a 1989 arcade-adventure game made by Superior Software
- Ricochet (2000 video game), a multiplayer mod based on the game Half-Life
- Ricochet Lost Worlds (2004), the second Breakout clone made by Reflexive Entertainment
  - Ricochet Lost Worlds: Recharged (2004), the third Breakout clone made by Reflexive Entertainment
- Ricochet Infinity (2007), the fourth Breakout clone made by Reflexive Entertainment
- Ricochet (software label), a software label owned by Mastertronic for budget re-releases of other publishers' full-price games

== Internet ==
- Ricochet (Internet service), one of the pioneering wireless Internet service providers in the United States
- Ricochet (website), an interactive conservative political news and commentary website
- Ricochet (software), an instant messaging software project
- Surf Dog Ricochet

== Amusement park rides ==
- Ricochet (Kings Dominion), a roller coaster at Kings Dominion amusement park
- Ricochet (Carowinds), a roller coaster at Carowinds amusement park

== Music ==
- Ricochet, a playing technique on bowed instruments, also known as jeté; see violin technique
- Ricochet (band), an American country music group
- Ricoshëi (pronounced "Ricochet"), a Los Angeles-based electronic music duo.

=== Albums ===
- Ricochet (Bay City Rollers album), a 1981 rock album
- Ricochet (CatHead album), the debut album by indie rock artist CatHead
- Ricochet (Jo Jo Zep & The Falcons album), 2003
- Ricochet (Nitty Gritty Dirt Band album), 1967
- Ricochet (Rise Against album), 2025
- Ricochet (Ricochet album), this band's self-titled album
- Ricochet (Sam Rivers album), 2020
- Ricochet (Snail Mail album), 2026
- Ricochet (Tangerine Dream album), the first live album by German electronic music group Tangerine Dream
- Ricochet, an album by Kenny

=== Songs ===
- "Ricochet" (Teresa Brewer song), a 1953 popular song written by Coleman, Darion & Gimble
- "Ricochet" (Faith No More song), a song by Faith No More from the 1995 album King for a Day... Fool for a Lifetime
- "Ricochet!", a song by Shiny Toy Guns from the 2008 album Season of Poison
- "Ricochet", a song by Anohni from the 2017 EP Paradise
- "Ricochet", a song by Chase Atlantic from the 2024 album Lost in Heaven
- "Ricochet", a song by David Bowie from the 1983 album Let's Dance
- "Ricochet", a song by John Fogerty released in 1974 as a single B-side
- "Ricochet", a song by Sondre Lerche from the 2011 album Sondre Lerche
- "Ricochet", a song by Norrie Paramor and The Midland Radio Orchestra released in 1974 as the theme to Dial M for Murder
- "Ricochet", a song by Preoccupations from the 2022 album Arrangements
- "Ricochet", a song by Rise Against from the 2025 album Ricochet
- "Ricochet", a song by September from the 2011 album Love CPR
- "Ricochet", a song by Starset from the 2017 album Vessels

== See also ==
- Rikochet (disambiguation)
