= Field artillery in the American Civil War =

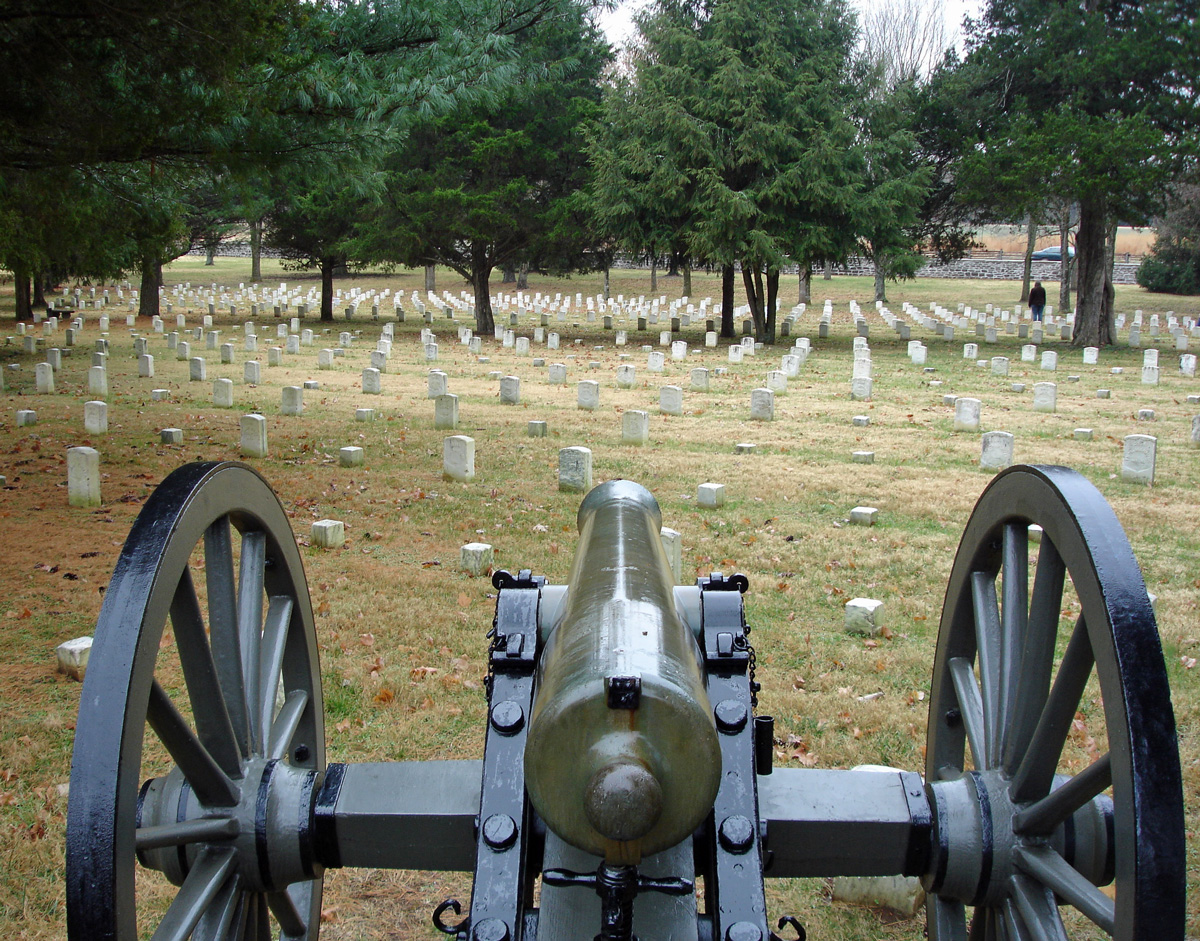
M1857 Napoleon at Stones River battlefield cemetery.

Field artillery in the American Civil War refers to the artillery weapons, equipment, and practices used by the artillery branch to support infantry and cavalry forces in the field. It does not include siege artillery, use of artillery in fixed fortifications, coastal or naval artillery. It also does not include smaller, specialized artillery pieces classified as infantry guns.

== Weapons ==
The principal guns widely used in the field are listed in the following table.

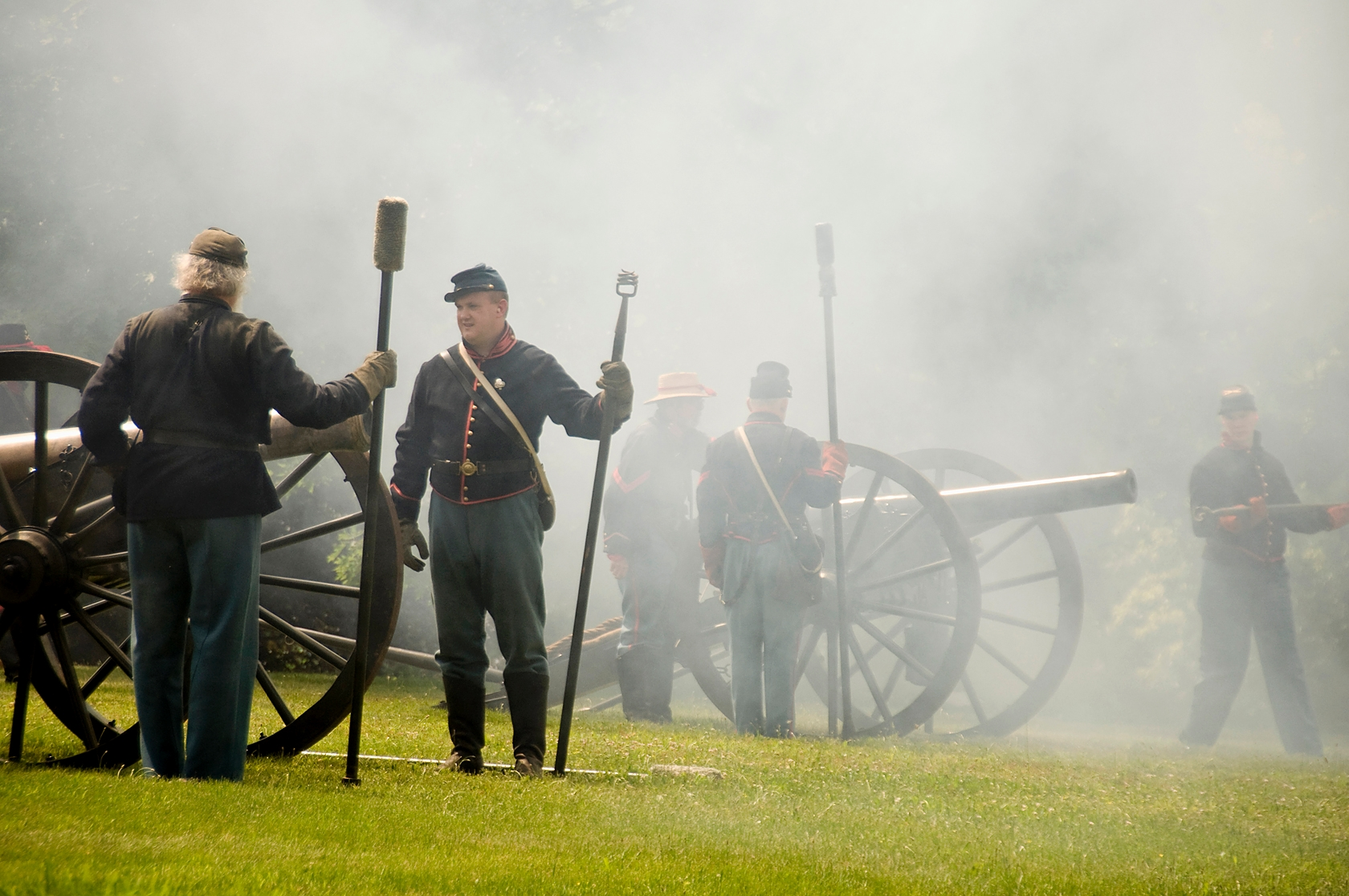
Firing demonstrations of Civil War era artillery pieces at the Springfield Armory, June 2010

Field artillery weapons characteristics
Name	Tube				Projectile (lb)	Charge (lb)	Velocity (ft/s)	Range (yd at 5°)
Name	Material	Bore (in)	Len (in)	Wt (lb)	Projectile (lb)	Charge (lb)	Velocity (ft/s)	Range (yd at 5°)
6-pounder field gun	bronze	3.67	60	884	6.1	1.25	1,439	1,523
M1857 12-pounder Napoleon	bronze	4.62	66	1,227	12.9	2.50	1,440	1,619
12-pounder howitzer	bronze	4.62	53	788	8.9	1.00	1,054	1,072
12-pounder mountain howitzer	bronze	4.62	33	220	8.9	0.5	---	1,005
24-pounder howitzer	bronze	5.82	64	1,318	18.4	2.00	1,060	1,322
10-pounder Parrott rifle	iron	2.9 or 3.0	74	890	9.5	1.00	1,230	1,850
3-inch Ordnance rifle	wrought iron	3.0	69	820	9.5	1.00	1,215	1,830
14-pounder James rifle (Note: This is for Hotchkiss shell of 14lb @ 5 degrees. Hazlett used the only primary source: Abbot's Siege Artillery... p. 116. Hazlett determined bore and Type I based on text description and shell weight--matching recorded weights of modern recoveries. Coles' data table and many others based on Peterson's 1959 book have impossibly small powder charge for range and weight given. Later 14-pounder James types with Ordnance profile had longer barrels with 7.5" greater bore length (13% increase) and therefore should have increased range.)	bronze	3.80	60	875	14.0	1.25	----	1,530
20-pounder Parrott rifle	iron	3.67	84	1,750	20.0	2.00	1,250	1,900
12-pounder Whitworth breechloading rifle	iron	2.75	104	1,092	12.0	1.75	1,500	2,800
Italics denotes data for shell, not shot.

There were two general types of artillery weapons used during the Civil War: smoothbores and rifles. Smoothbores included howitzers and guns.

=== Smoothbore artillery ===
Smoothbore artillery refers to weapons that are not rifled. At the time of the Civil War, metallurgy and other supporting technologies had just recently evolved to a point allowing the large scale production of rifled field artillery. As such, many smoothbore weapons were still in use and production even at the end of the war. Smoothbore field artillery of the day fit into two role-based categories: guns and howitzers. Further classifications of the weapons were made based on the type of metal used, typically bronze or iron (cast or wrought), although some examples of steel were produced. Additionally, the artillery was often identified by the year of design in the Ordnance department references.

The smoothbore artillery was also categorized by the bore dimensions, based on the rough weight of the solid shot projectile fired from the weapon. For instance a 12-pounder field gun fired a 12-pound solid shot projectile from its 4.62-inch (117 mm) diameter bore. It was practice, dating back to the 18th century, to mix gun and howitzers into batteries. Pre-war allocations called for 6-pounder field guns matched with 12-pounder howitzers, 9 and 12-pounder field guns matched with 24-pounder howitzers. But the rapid expansions of both combatant armies, mass introduction of rifled artillery, and the versatility of the 12-pounder "Napoleon" class of weapons all contributed to a change in the mixed battery practices.

==== 12-pounder Napoleon ====
The twelve-pound cannon "Napoleon" was the most popular smoothbore cannon used during the war. It was named after Napoleon III of France and was widely admired because of its safety, reliability, and killing power, especially at close range. In Union Ordnance manuals it was referred to as the "light 12-pounder gun" to distinguish it from the heavier and longer 12-pounder gun (which was virtually unused in field service.) It did not reach America until 1857. It was the last cast bronze gun used by an American army. The Federal version of the Napoleon can be recognized by the flared front end of the barrel, called the muzzle-swell. It was, however, relatively heavy compared to other artillery pieces and difficult to move across rough terrain.

Confederate Napoleons were produced in at least six variations, most of which had straight muzzles, but at least eight catalogued survivors of 133 identified have muzzle swells. Additionally, four iron Confederate Napoleons produced by Tredegar Iron Works in Richmond have been identified, of an estimated 125 cast. In early 1863 Robert E. Lee sent nearly all of the Army of Northern Virginia's bronze 6-pounder guns to Tredegar to be melted down and recast as Napoleons. Copper for casting bronze pieces became increasingly scarce to the Confederacy throughout the war and became acute in November 1863 when the Ducktown copper mines near Chattanooga were lost to Union forces. Casting of bronze Napoleons by the Confederacy ceased and in January 1864 Tredegar began producing iron Napoleons.

A Confederate cannoneer remembered, "Our guns were 12 pound brass Napoleons, smooth bore, but accounted the best gun for all round field service then made. They fired solid shot, shell, grape and canister, and were accurate at a mile. We would not have exchanged them for Parrott rifles, or any other style of guns. They were beautiful, perfectly plain, tapering gracefully from muzzle to "reinforce" or "butt," without rings, or ornaments of any kind. We are proud of them and felt towards them almost as if they were human..."

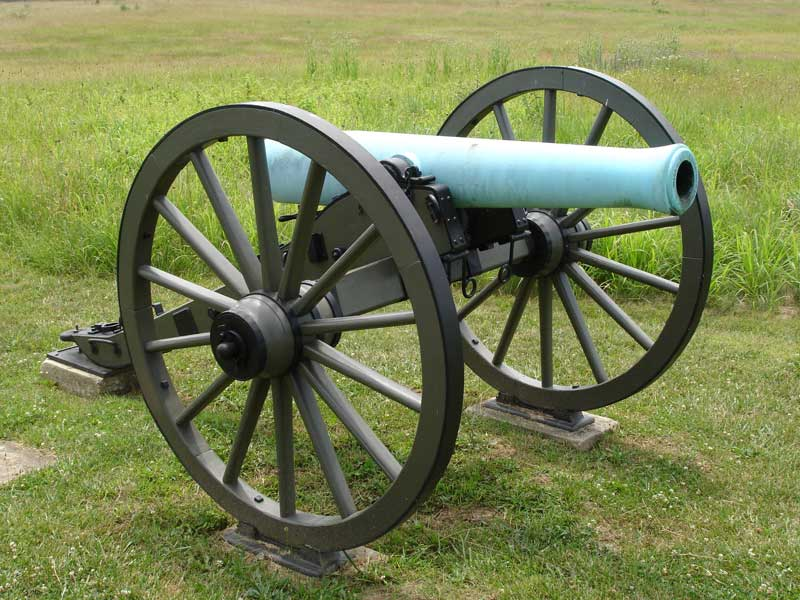
M1857 12-Pounder "Napoleon"

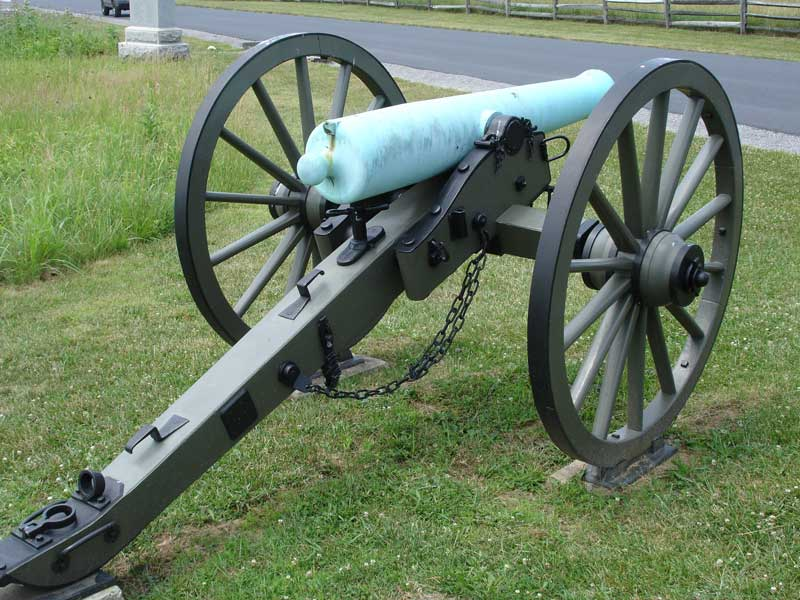
M1857 12-Pounder "Napoleon"

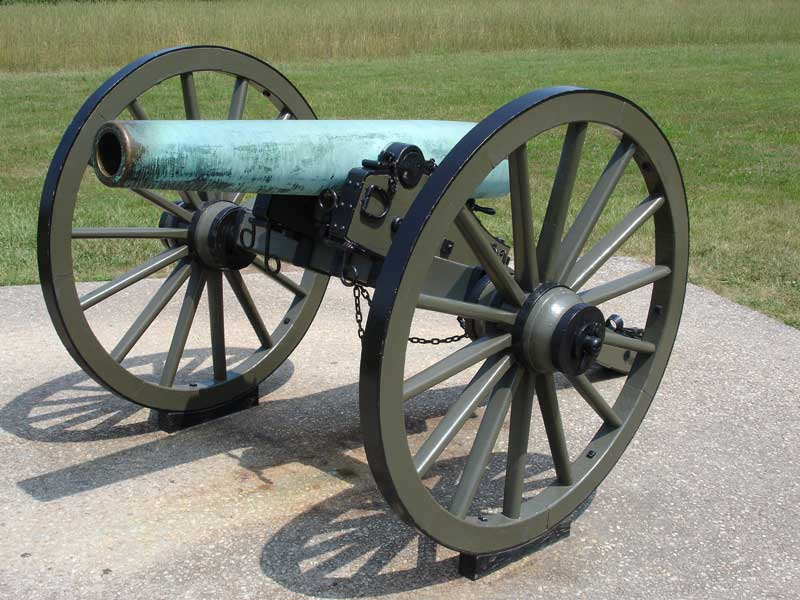
Confederate 12-Pound "Napoleon"

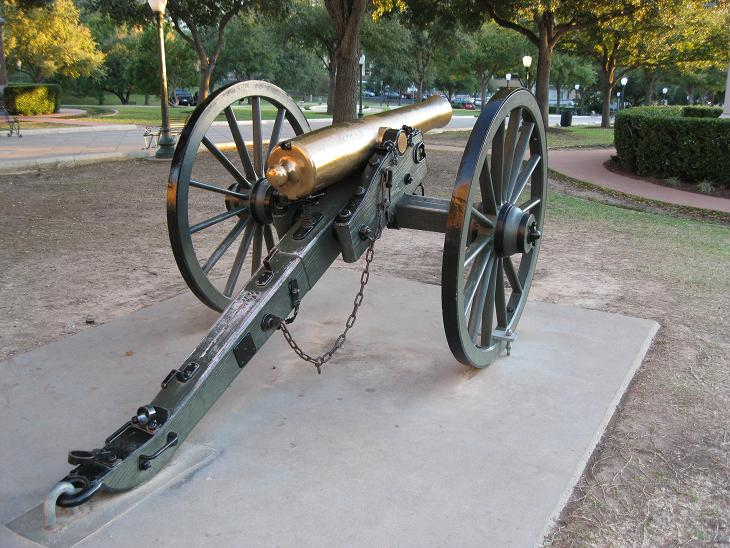
M1857 12-pounder "Napoleon" (1864)

==== Howitzers ====
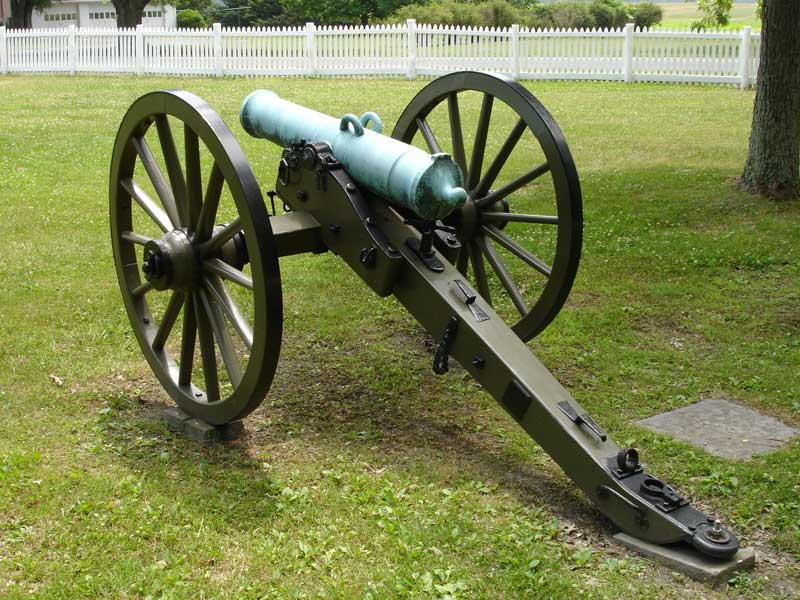
24-pounder Howitzer of Austrian manufacture imported by the Confederacy. Its tube was shorter and lighter than Federal 24-pounder Howitzers.

Howitzers were short-barreled guns that were optimized for firing explosive shells in a high trajectory, but also for spherical case shot and canister, over a shorter range than the guns. While field use alluded to firing at targets consisting of enemy forces arrayed in the open, howitzers were considered the weapon of choice if the opposing forces were concealed behind terrain features or fortifications. It cost about $500. Howitzers used lighter gunpowder charges than guns of corresponding caliber. Field howitzer calibers used in the Civil War were 12-pounder (4.62 inch bore), 24-pounder (5.82 inch bore), and 32-pounder (6.41 inch bore). Most of the howitzers used in the war were bronze, with notable exceptions of some of Confederate manufacture.

Coupled to the 6-pounder field gun in allocations of the pre-war Army, the M1841 12-pounder howitzer was represented by Models of 1835, 1838 and 1841. With a lightweight and respectable projectile payload, the 12-pounder was only cycled out of the main field army inventories as production and availability of the 12-pounder "Napoleon" rose, and would see action in the Confederate armies up to the very end.

As with the corresponding heavy field guns, the heavier howitzers were available in limited quantities early in the war. Both Federal and Confederate contracts list examples of 24-pounders delivered during the war, and surviving examples exist of imported Austrian types of this caliber used by the Confederates. The M1841 24-pounder howitzers found use in the "reserve" batteries of the respective armies, but were gradually replaced over time with heavy rifled guns. The only known 24-pounders in use by the Army of Northern Virginia were in Woolfolk's Batteries (later Battalion) with two batteries of 4 pieces each. With the exception of the Far Western theatre of the war (e.g. Halls Battery at the Battle of Valverde in New Mexico), Federals did not use 24-pounder howitzers in field. The 24-pounder and M1844 32-pounder howitzer were more widely used in fixed fortifications, but at least one of the latter large weapons was with the 1st Connecticut Artillery as late as 1864.

Finally, the lesser-known but highly mobile 12-pound M1841 mountain howitzer saw service with infantry and cavalry forces in the rugged western theaters and prairies, and continued in service during the Indian Wars. This versatile piece could utilize one of two carriages: a small carriage that could be drawn by a single animal or could be rapidly broken down to carry on the backs of pack animals, or a slightly larger prairie carriage to be drawn by two animals. A veteran of the Mexican–American War, several hundred more of these diminutive tubes were produced by Union foundries during the Civil War, and the Confederate Tredegar foundry turned out as many as 21 more. A Federal battery of four proved "highly effective" at the decisive battle of Glorieta Pass, New Mexico, and Nathan Bedford Forrest frequently employed mountain howitzers for the rapid close-quarters combat that he favored.

==== Smoothbore guns ====
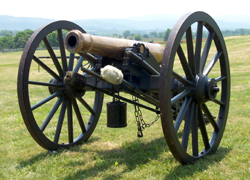
1841 Model Gun, fired 6 lb. projectiles, workhorse of the Mexican War, but considered obsolete by the Civil War, weight: 1,784 pounds, range: up to 1,523 yards

Smoothbore guns were designed to fire solid shot projectiles at high velocity, over low trajectories at targets in the open, although shell and canister were acceptable for use. The barrels of the guns were longer than corresponding howitzers, and called for higher powder charges to achieve the desired performance. Field guns were produced in 6-pounder (3.67 inch bore), 9-pounder (4.2 inch bore), and 12-pounder (4.62 inch bore) versions. Although some older iron weapons were pressed into service, and the Confederacy produced some new iron field guns, most of those used on the battlefields were of bronze construction.

The 6-pounder field gun was well represented by bronze Models of 1835, 1838, 1839, and 1841 early in the war. Even a few older iron Model 1819 weapons were pressed into service. Several hundred were used by the armies of both sides in 1861. But in practice the limited payload of the projectile was seen as a shortcoming of this weapon. Six pounder guns had mostly disappeared from the Union armies by 1863 but the Confederates continued using them until the end of the war.

The larger 9-pounders and 12-pounders were less well represented. While the 9-pounder was still listed on Ordnance and Artillery manuals in 1861, very few were ever produced after the War of 1812. Nine-pounders were universally gone well before the Mexican War, and only scant references exist to any Civil War use of the weapons. The 12-pounder field gun appeared in a series of models mirroring the 6-pounder, but in far less numbers. At least one Federal battery, the 13th Indiana, took the 12-pounder field gun into service early in the war. The major shortcoming of these heavy field guns was mobility, as they required eight-horse teams as opposed to the six-horse teams of the lighter guns. A small quantity of 12-pounder field guns were rifled early in the war, but these were more experimental weapons, and no field service is recorded.

By far the most popular of the smoothbore cannon was the 12-pounder model of 1857, Light, commonly called "Napoleon". The Model 1857 was of lighter weight than the previous 12-pounder guns, and could be pulled by a six-horse draft, yet offered the heavier projectile payload of the larger bore. It is sometimes called, confusingly, a "gun-howitzer" (because it possessed characteristics of both gun and howitzer) and is discussed in more detail separately below.

=== Rifled artillery ===
==== 3-inch ordnance rifle ====
The 3-inch (76 mm) rifle was the most widely used rifled gun during the war. Invented by John Griffen, it was extremely durable, with the barrel made of wrought iron, primarily produced by the Phoenix Iron Company of Phoenixville, Pennsylvania. There are few cases on record of the tube fracturing or bursting, a problem that plagued other rifles made of brittle cast iron. The rifle had exceptional accuracy. During the Battle of Atlanta, a Confederate gunner was quoted: "The Yankee three-inch rifle was a dead shot at any distance under a mile. They could hit the end of a flour barrel more often than miss, unless the gunner got rattled." The 1st Minnesota Light Artillery Battery converted to the 3-inch Rifle on 5 March 1864; they were described as "3-inch Rodman's guns" in an 11 Nov. 1864 letter from 1st Lieutenant Henry S. Hurter to the Minnesota Adjutant General.

The 1st Minnesota Light Artillery took part in the Atlanta campaign. It was retained in service after the war, with many converted to breechloading weapons as 3.2-inch converted rifles or 3-inch saluting guns. It was eventually replaced by the 3.2-inch gun M1885. The Confederates were unable to manufacture the wrought iron barrels for the 3" rifle, thus captured ones were prized items. Despite the effectiveness of this weapon, the Confederacy did produce various bronze 3" rifles and cast iron pieces with a straight tube; however, none of them were reliable and the latter were often prone to bursting at the breech.

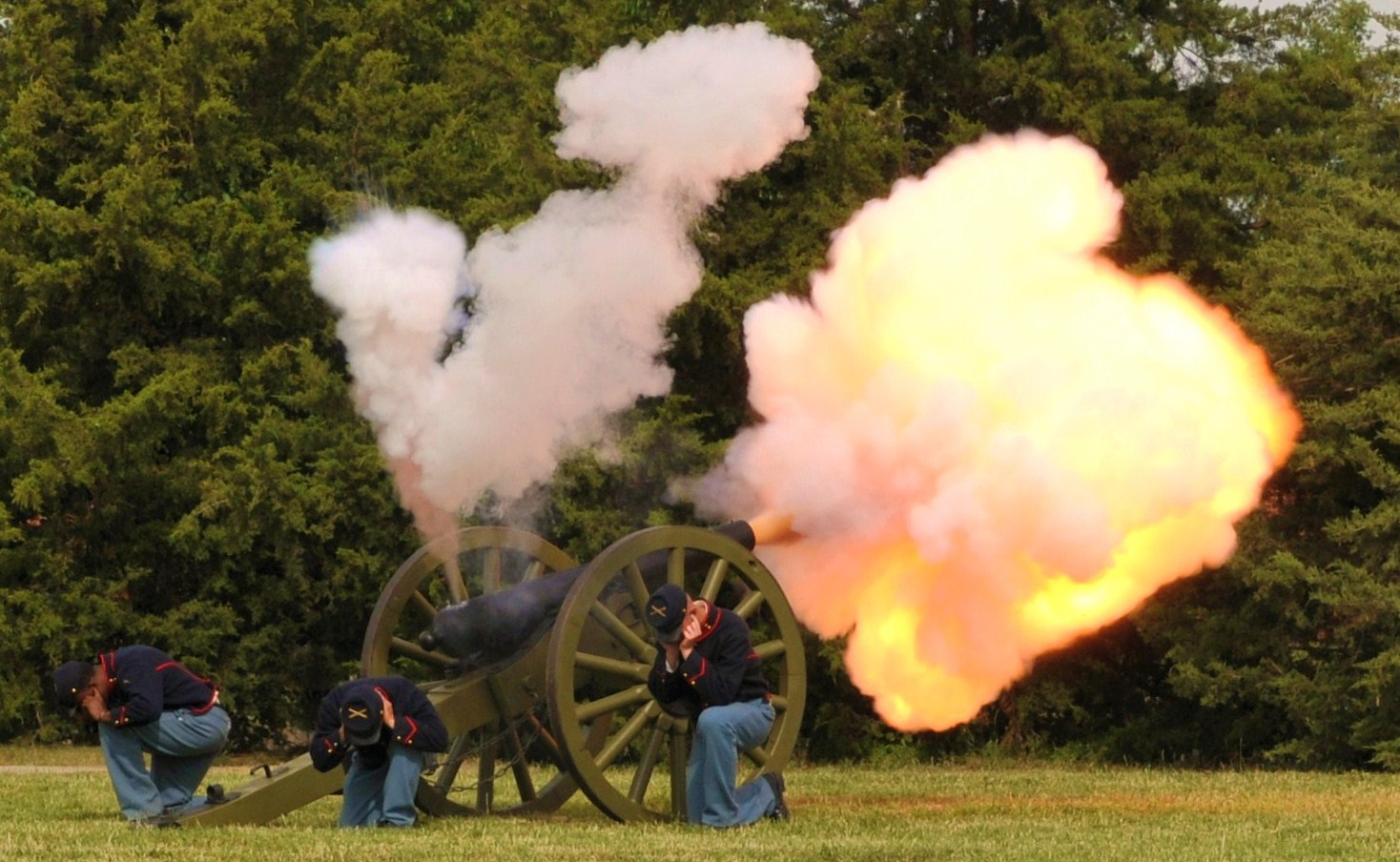
Artillerymen from Ft. Riley fire a replica of the 1855 model 3-inch cannon, 2012.

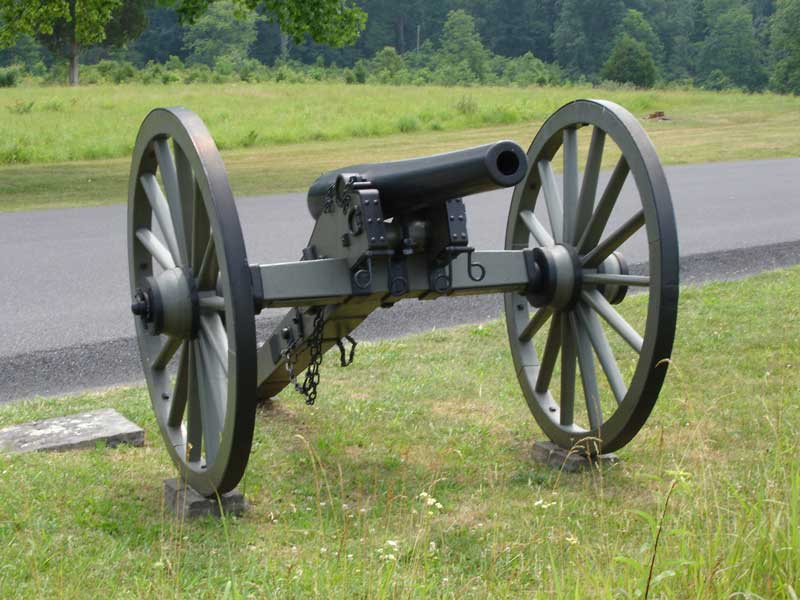
3-inch ordnance rifle (front view)

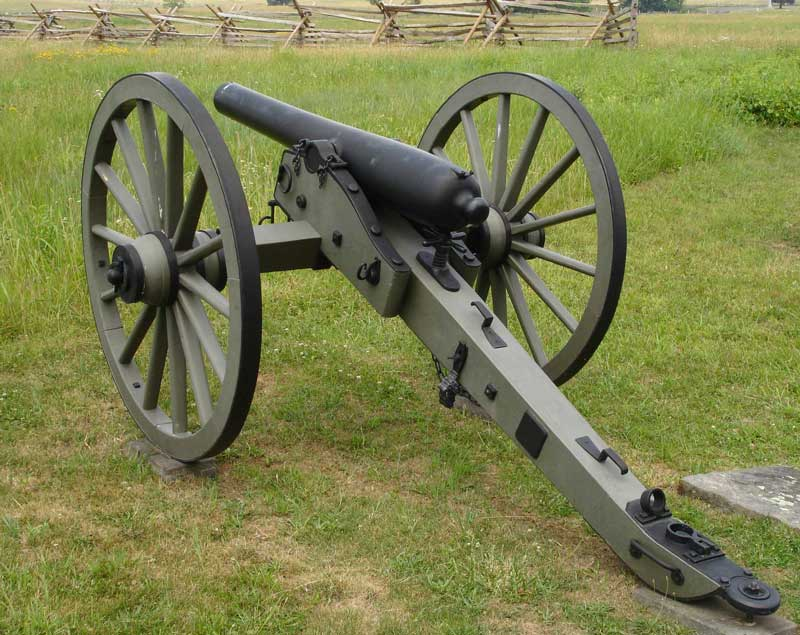
3-inch ordnance rifle (rear view)

==== Confederate revolver cannon ====
The Confederacy also developed a 2-inch bore five shot machine cannon during the war. It was used in the siege of Petersburg, Va., and was later captured on 27 April 1865, at Danville, Va., by Union troops and sent to the Ordnance Laboratory, United States Military Academy, West Point, N.Y.

The weapon uses the principle of the service revolver whereby rotation of the cylinder indexes a loaded chamber with the breech end of the barrel. It is held in alignment by a spring loaded dog slipping into a recess in the cylinder. To cut gas leakage to a minimum, a screw arrangement at the rear jacks the cylinder forward after positioning until a tight joint is effected between the front of the chamber in the cylinder and the breech end of the barrel.

The chambers are ignited by use of a percussion cap on a nipple. The cap is struck by a huge spring actuated striker built into the flat strip that supports the chambers at their aft end. The cylinder is moved one fifth of a revolution and lined up for firing by the moving of a lever from left to right. The lever is attached to a ratchet arrangement, the distance moved being regulated by its mounting in the frame in such a manner as to control the revolving of the cylinder. The lever when brought to the left as far as possible and swung to the right as much as the frame will permit turns the cylinder one fifth of a revolution and indexes the loaded chamber.

Its use at this time showed the serious effort of the Confederacy to develop a weapon capable of sustained fire.

==== James rifle ====
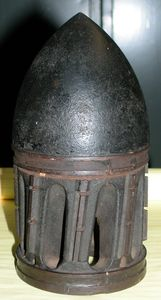
3.8" James shot, without the lead sabot sleeve that would cover the ribs and expand into the rifling.

Even before the start of the Civil War, an ordnance board recommended that rifling be added to the 6-pounder field gun in order to improve its accuracy. In December 1860, Secretary of War John Floyd wrote, "the results of trials of rifled cannon and projectiles … indicates a superiority of James expanding projectiles for such cannon. The regulation 6-pounder, with a rifled bore (weight 884 pounds), carries a James projectile of about 13 pounds." James rifles were an early solution to the need for rifled artillery at the start of the war. Six-pounder bronze guns could be rifled to fire the projectiles invented by Charles Tillinghast James. Some were simply rifled from their initial 3.67" bore, others were reamed to 3.80" then rifled. Reaming to 3.80" was preferred to eliminate wear deformities from service. Contemporaries often failed to differentiate between the two bore sizes. However, the effective descriptions for the 3.67" gun are rifled 6-pounder or 12-pounder James rifle, while the 3.80" variant was known as the 14-pounder James rifle. To add to the confusion, the variants of the 3.80" bore rifle included two profiles (6-pounder and Ordnance), two metals (bronze and iron), three types of rifling (15, 10, and 7 grooves), and different weights.

Although the James rifles were reported to be extremely accurate, the bronze rifling wore out rapidly, and the James rifles and projectiles soon fell out of favor. No James rifles are known to have been produced after 1862. The total numbers of James rifles are uncertain, but the 1862 Ohio Quartermaster General annual report recorded 82 rifled bronze pieces (44 of those specified as "3.80 bore [James rifles]") out of a total of 162 of all field artillery types. Unusual or out-of-favor types migrated to the Western theaters.

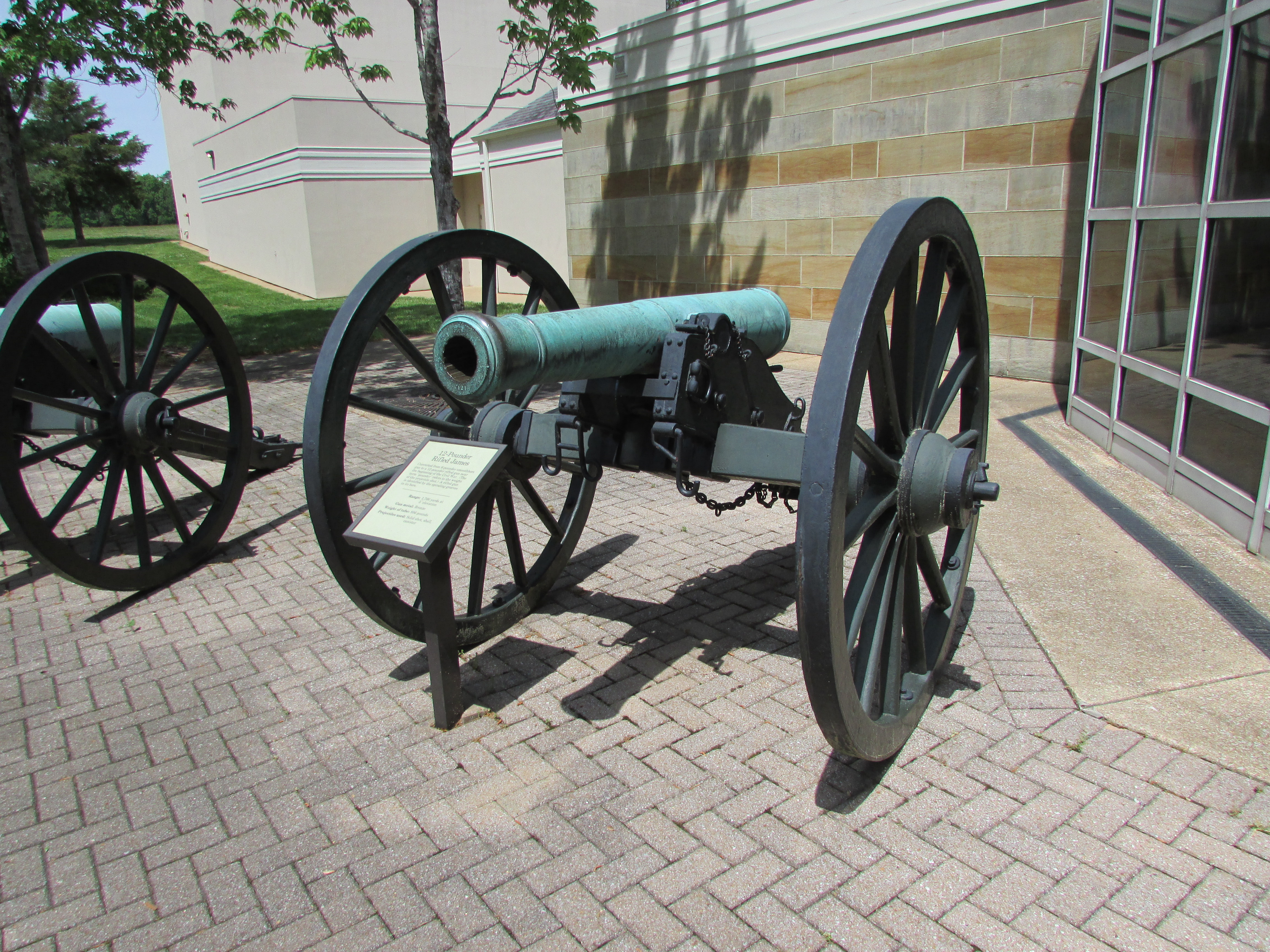
12-pounder James rifle: Rifled Model 1841 6-pounder field gun

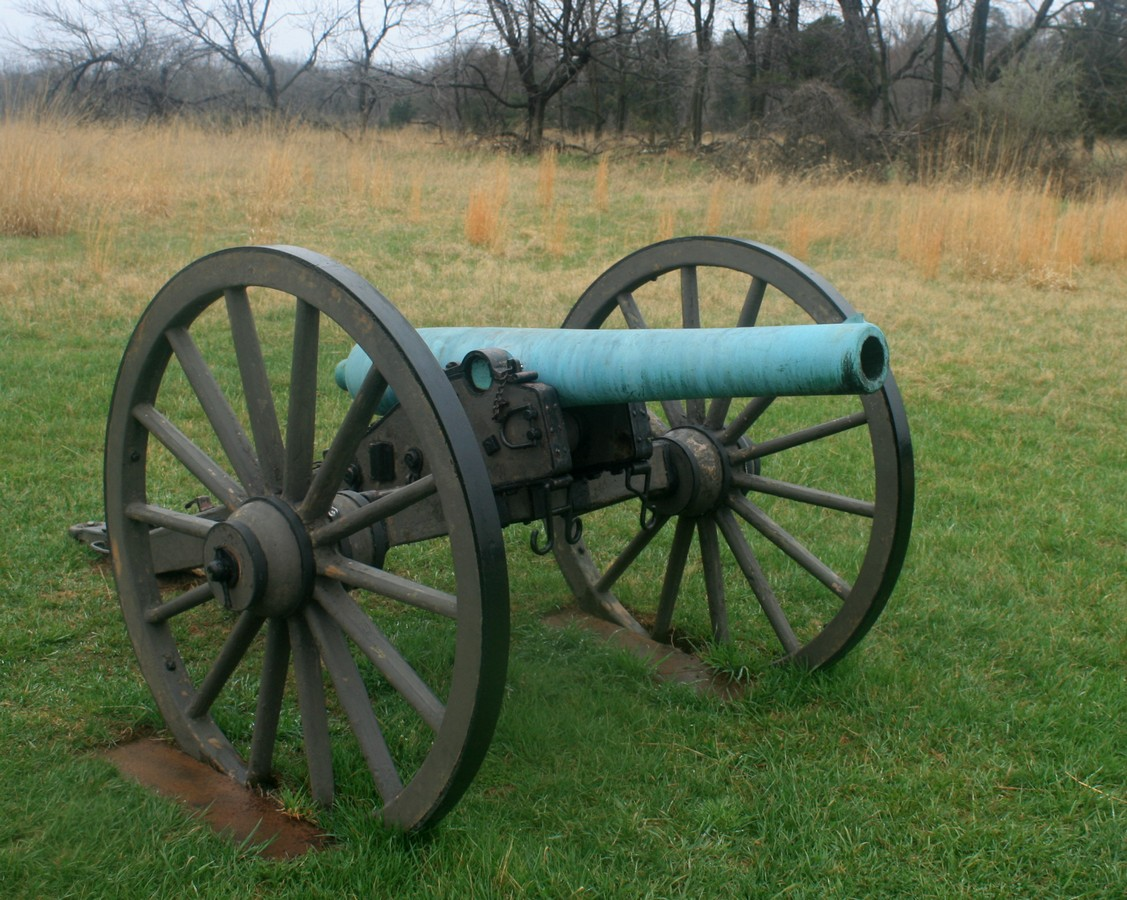
14-pounder James rifle: Ordnance profile (New Model/Model 1861)

==== Parrott rifle ====
The Parrott rifle invented by Robert P. Parrott, was manufactured in different sizes, from the 10-pounder Parrott rifle up to the rare 300-pounder. The 10- and 20-pounder Parrott rifles were used by both armies in the field. The smaller size was much more prevalent; it was made in two bore sizes, 2.9-inch (74 mm) and 3.0-inch (76 mm). Confederate forces used both bore sizes during the war, which added to the complication of supplying the appropriate ammunition to its batteries. Until 1864, Union batteries used only the 2.9 inch Parrott, but they also employed 3" Ordnance rifles. During the first day of the battle of Gettysburg, three Parrott rifles were temporarily unusable when 3" ammunition was mistakenly issued to the battery. Following this, plans were made to re-bore all of the 2.9" Parrotts to 3" to standardize ammunition, and no further 2.9" Parrotts were to be produced. The M1863, with a 3-inch (76 mm) bore, had firing characteristics similar to the earlier model; it can be recognized by its straight barrel, without muzzle-swell.

Parrott rifles saw use in all the major battles of the war; the Union army carried a number of 10-pounders at First Bull Run and one 30-pounder. The 20-pounder Parrott only began production in the summer of 1861 and none were delivered until late in the year.

Parrotts were manufactured with a combination of cast iron and wrought iron. Cast iron improved the accuracy of the gun, but was brittle enough to suffer fractures. On the Parrott, a large reinforcing band made of tougher wrought iron was overlaid on the breech. The Parrott, while accurate, had a poor reputation for safety, and it was shunned by many artillerymen. The 20-pounder was the largest field gun used during the war, with the barrel alone weighing over 1,800 pounds (800 kg). After the Battle of Fredericksburg, the Army of the Potomac's chief of artillery Henry J. Hunt attempted to have the 20-pounder Parrott removed from the army's inventory, arguing that its enormous weight required a team of eight horses instead of the six needed for lighter guns, and the long range shells were of questionable reliability.

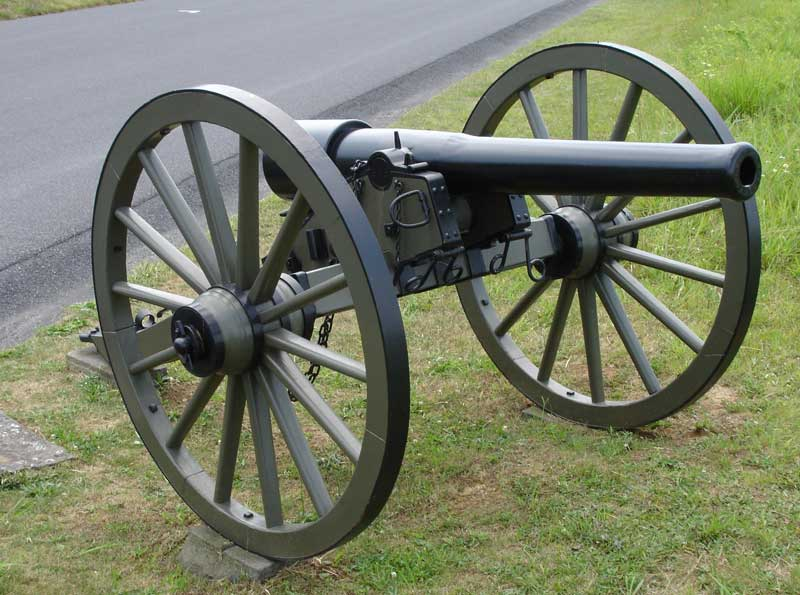
10-Pounder Parrott Rifle

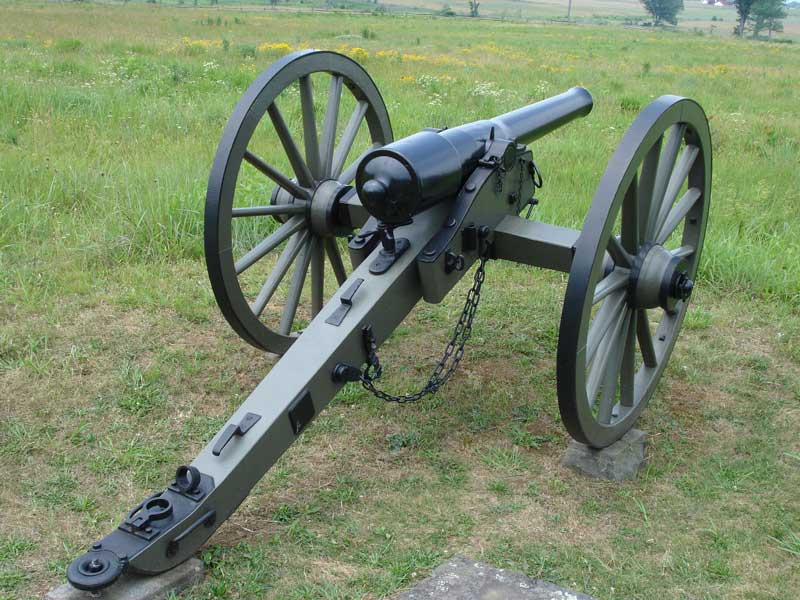
10-Pounder Parrott Rifle

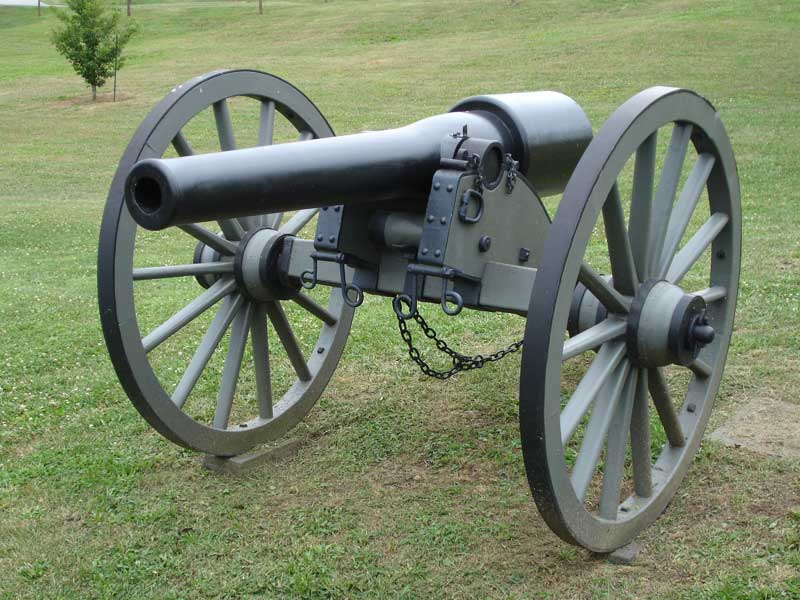
20-Pounder Parrott Rifle

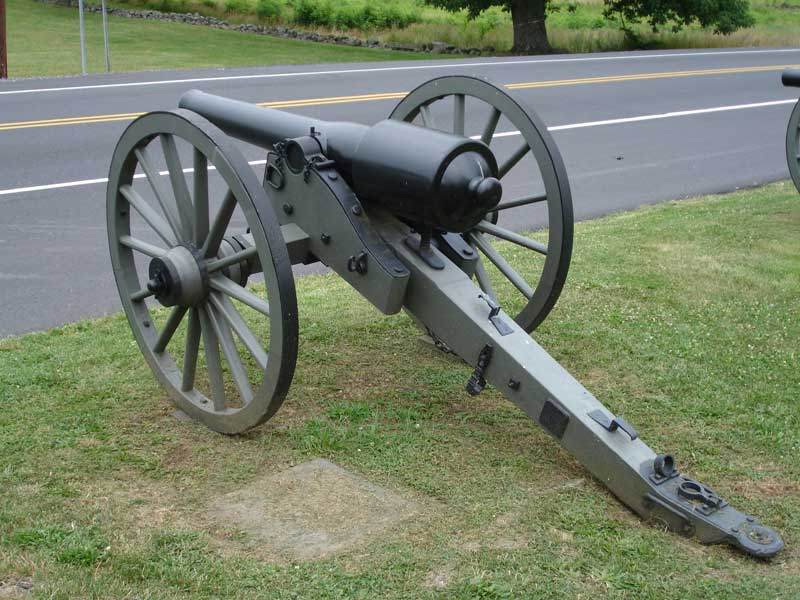
20-Pounder Parrott Rifle

==== Whitworth rifles ====
The Whitworth, designed by Joseph Whitworth and manufactured in England, was a rare gun during the war but an interesting precursor to modern artillery in that it was loaded from the breech and had exceptional accuracy over great distance. An engineering magazine wrote in 1864 that, "At 1600 yards [1500 m] the Whitworth gun fired 10 shots with a lateral deviation of only 5 inches." This degree of accuracy made it effective in counter-battery fire, used almost as the equivalent of a sharpshooter's rifle, and also for firing over bodies of water. It was not popular as an anti-infantry weapon. It had a caliber of 2.75 inches (70 mm). The bore was hexagonal in cross-section, and the projectile was a long bolt that twisted to conform to the rifling. It is said that the bolts made a very distinctive eerie sound when fired, which could be distinguished from other projectiles.

Whitworth also designed a 3-pounder breechloading rifle which saw limited use in the war.

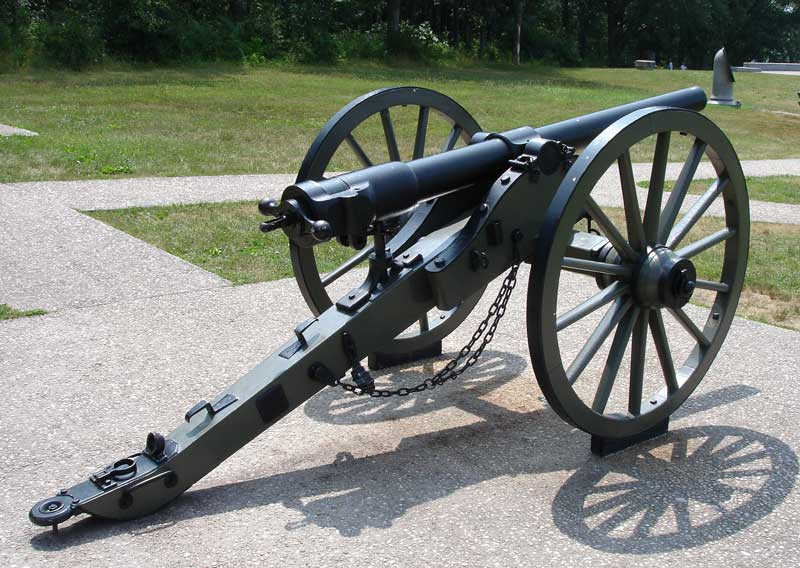
12-Pounder Whitworth Breechloading Rifle

=== Types of guns used ===
The table below lists the guns used by both armies at the Battle of Antietam in September 1862. Though both sides employed the 6-pounder field gun and 12-pounder howitzer in the early battles, they were recognized as inferior to the 12-pounder Napoleon and soon discontinued in the Union armies in the Eastern Theater. However, Union and Confederate armies in the Western Theater continued to use both weapons. Some 6-pounder field guns were converted to 12- or 14-pounder James rifles. The 32-pounder howitzer was too heavy to be employed as field artillery and the one battery using them was soon rearmed with 3-inch Ordnance rifles. The 12-pounder Blakely rifle had a particularly violent recoil and fell out of favor.

Artillery pieces employed at the Battle of Antietam
Artillery piece	Union Army	Confederate Army
M1841 6-pounder field gun	0	41
M1841 12-pounder howitzer	3	44
M1841 24-pounder howitzer	0	4
M1841 32-pounder howitzer	6	0
M1857 12-pounder Napoleon gun-howitzer	117	14
12-pounder James rifle	10	0
12-pounder Dahlgren boat howitzer	5	0
12-pounder Naval howitzer	0	2
3-inch Ordnance rifle	81	42
10-pounder Parrott rifle	57	43
20-pounder Parrott rifle	22	0
Whitworth rifle	0	2
12-pounder Blakely rifle	0	7
Unidentified	0	42

== Ammunition ==
Ammunition came in wide varieties, designed to attack specific targets. A typical Union artillery battery (armed with six 12-pounder Napoleons) carried the following ammunition going into battle: 288 solid shot, 96 shells, 288 spherical case rounds, and 96 canister rounds.

=== Canister ===
Canister shot was the deadliest type of ammunition, consisting of a thin metal container containing layers of lead or iron balls packed in sawdust. Upon exiting the muzzle, the container disintegrated, and the balls fanned out as the equivalent of a very large shotgun blast. The effective range of the canister was only 400 yards (370 m), but within that range dozens of enemy infantrymen could be mowed down. Even more devastating was "double canister", generally used only in dire circumstances at extremely close range, where two containers of balls were fired simultaneously using the regular single powder charge.

=== Case (or shrapnel) ===
Case (or "spherical case" for smoothbores) were antipersonnel projectiles carrying a smaller burst charge than shell, but designed to be more effective against exposed troops. While the shell produced only a few large fragments, the case was loaded with lead or iron balls and was designed to burst above and before the enemy line, showering down many more small but destructive projectiles on the enemy. The effect was analogous to a weaker version of canister. With case the lethality of the balls and fragments came from the velocity of the projectile itself – the small burst charge only fragmented the case and dispersed the shrapnel. The spherical case used in a 12-pounder Napoleon contained 78 balls. The name shrapnel derives from its inventor, Henry Shrapnel.

The primary limitations to case effectiveness came in judging the range, setting the fuse accordingly, and the reliability and variability of the fuse itself.

=== Grapeshot ===
Grapeshot, which originated as a naval round for cutting enemy rigging or clearing packed decks of personnel, was the predecessor of, and a variation on, canister, in which a smaller number of larger metal balls were arranged on stacked iron plates with a threaded bolt running down the center to hold them as a unit inside the barrel. It was used at a time when some cannons burst when loaded with too much gunpowder, but as cannons got stronger, grapeshot was replaced by canister. A grapeshot round (or "stand") used in a 12-pounder Napoleon contained 9 balls, contrasted against the 27 smaller balls in a canister round. By the time of the Civil War, grapeshot was obsolete and largely replaced by canister. The period Ordnance and Gunnery work states that grape was excluded from "field and mountain services." Few, if any, rounds were issued to field artillery batteries.

=== Shell ===
Shells consisted of a strong casing around an explosive charge, in order to generate a strong, brisant explosion from a low explosive such as gunpowder. The fragments of the shell could do considerable damage, but they tended to fragment into a few large pieces. For smoothbores, the projectile was referred to as "spherical shell". Shells were more effective against troops behind obstacles or earthworks, and they were good for destroying wooden buildings by setting them on fire. They were ineffective against good quality masonry. A primary weakness of shell was that it typically produced only a few large fragments, the count increasing with caliber of the shell. A Confederate mid-war innovation was the "polygonal cavity" or "segmented" shell which used a polyhedral cavity core to create lines of weakness in the shell wall (similar to the later fragmentation grenade) that would yield more regular fragmentation patterns—typically twelve similarly sized fragments. While segmented designs were most common in spherical shell, it was applied to specific rifled projectiles as well.

Spherical shell used time fuses, while rifled shell could use timed fuse or be detonated on impact by percussion fuse. Fuse reliability was a concern; any shell that buried itself into the earth before detonating had little anti-personnel effectiveness. However, large caliber shells, such as the 32-pounder spherical, were effective at breaching entrenchments.

=== Shot (or bolt) ===
Shot was a solid projectile that included no explosive charge. For a smoothbore, the projectile was a round "cannonball". For a rifled gun, the projectile was referred to as a bolt and had a cylindrical shape. In both cases, the projectile was used to impart kinetic energy for a battering effect, particularly effective for destroying enemy guns, limbers, caissons, and wagons. It was also effective for mowing down columns of infantry and cavalry and had psychological effects against its targets. Despite its effectiveness, many artillerymen were reluctant to use solid shot, preferring the explosive types of ordnance. With solid projectiles, accuracy was the paramount consideration, and they also caused more tube wear than their explosive counterparts.

While rifled cannon had much greater accuracy on average than smoothbores, the smoothbores had an advantage firing round shot relative to the bolts fired from rifled pieces. Round shot could be employed in ricochet fire, extending the depth and range of its effect on land or water while bolts tended to dig in rather than ricochet.

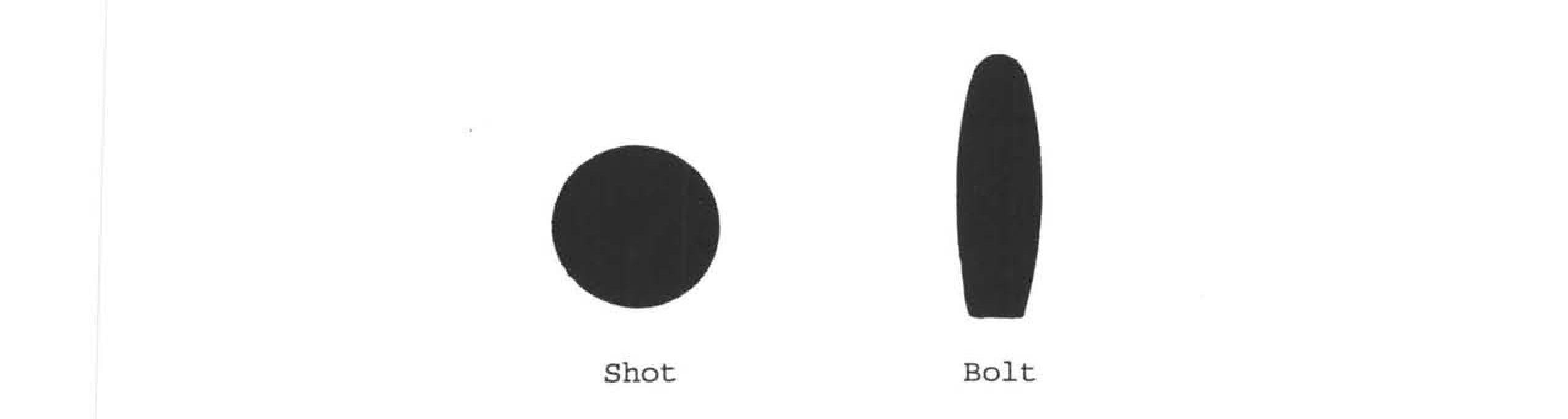
Shot/Bolt

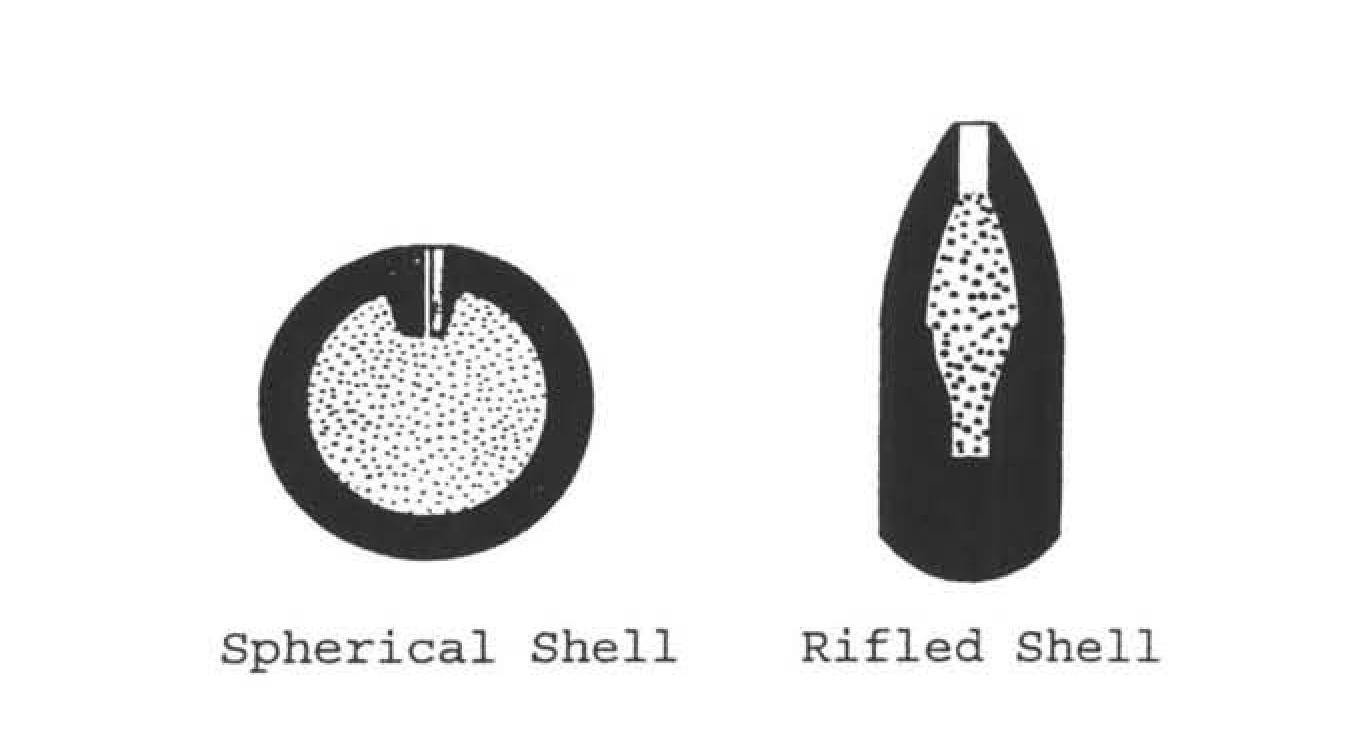
Shell

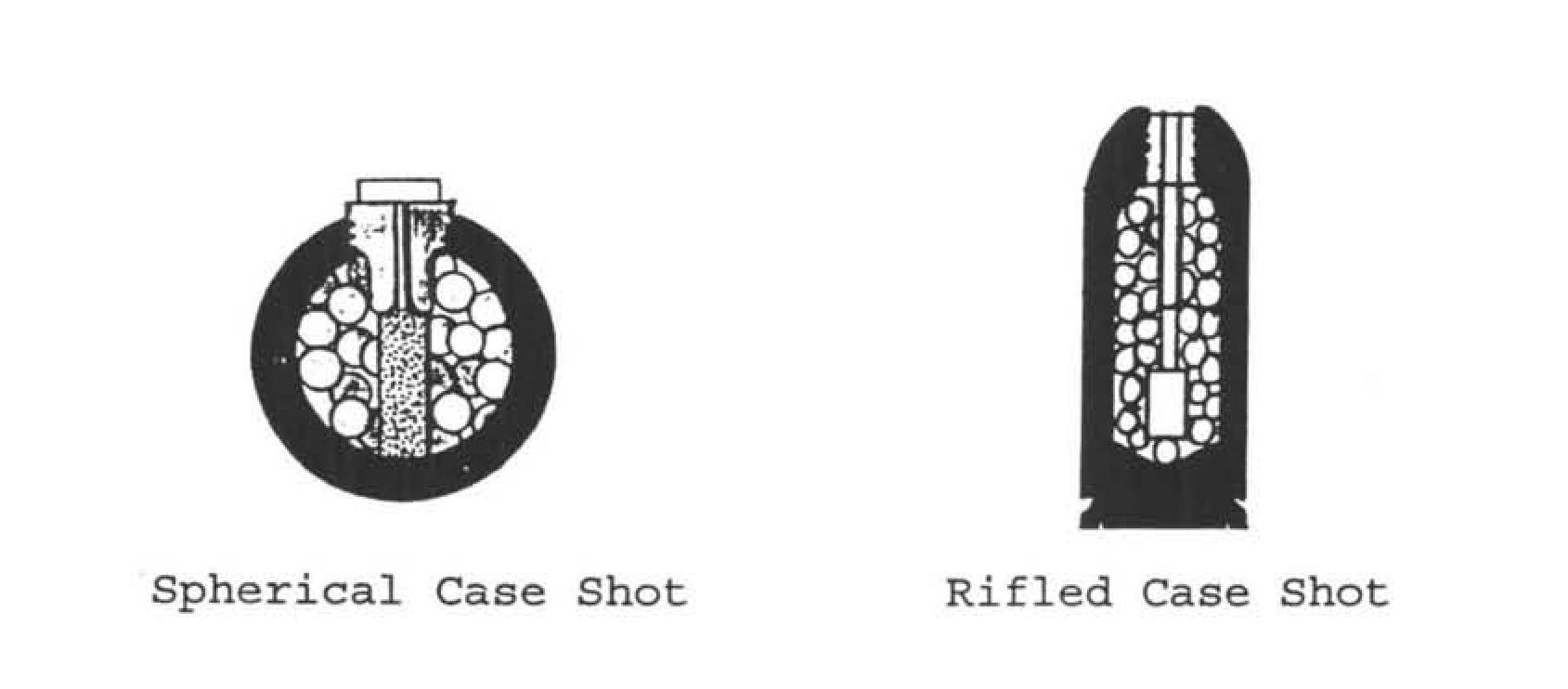
Case

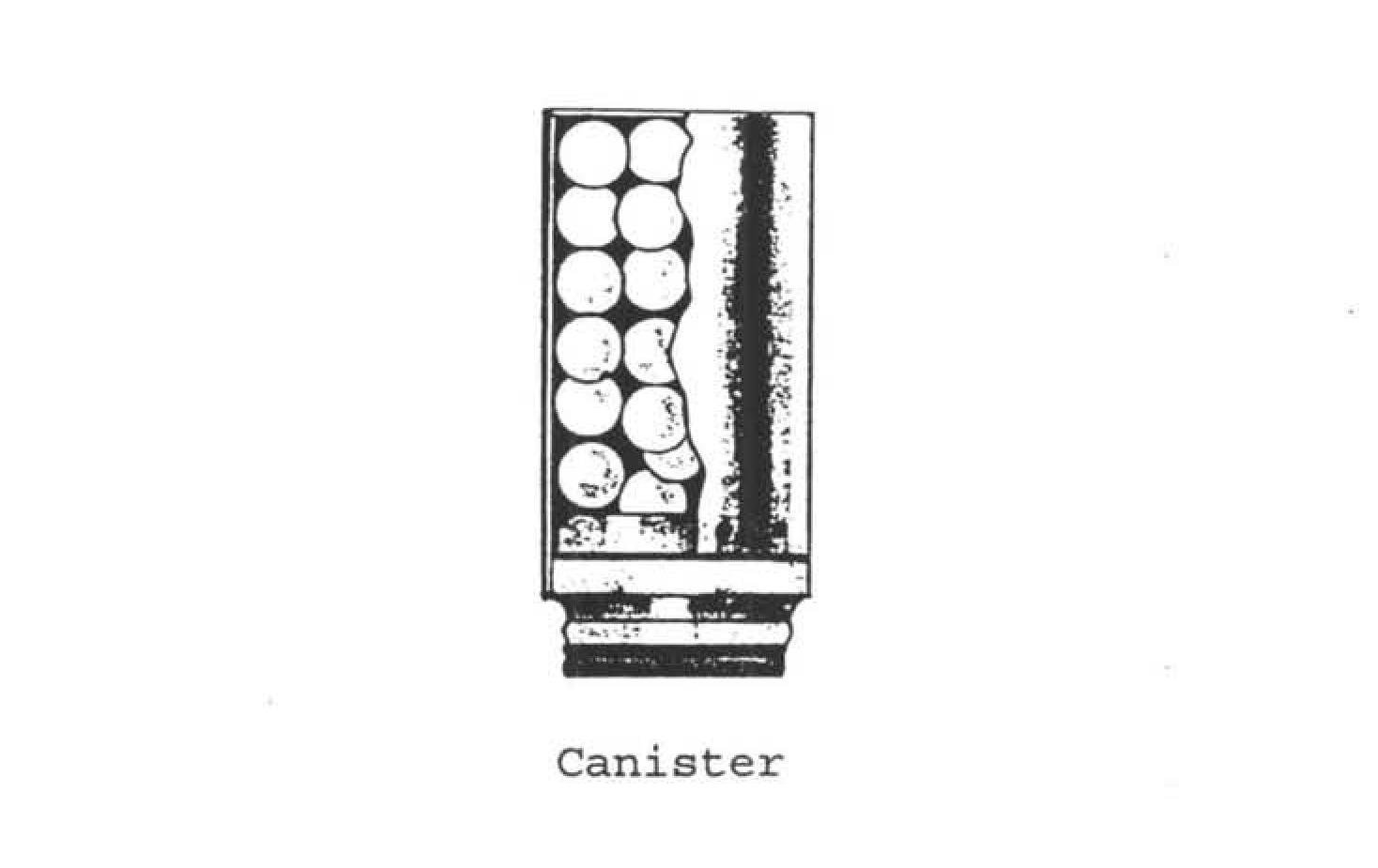
Canister

== Equipment ==
The most pervasive piece of artillery equipment was the horse.

=== Caisson ===
The caisson was a two-wheeled carriage. It carried two ammunition chests and a spare wheel. A fully loaded limber and caisson combination weighed 3,811 pounds (1728.6 kg).

The gun carriages, caissons and limbers were all constructed of oak. Each ammunition chest typically carried about 500 pounds (226.8 kg) of ammunition or supplies. In addition to these vehicles, there were also battery supply wagons and portable forges that were used to service the guns.

=== Horse ===
Horses were used to pull the cannon and ammunition. On average, each horse pulled about 700 pounds (317.5 kg). Each gun in a battery used two six-horse teams (for normal field artillery; heavier guns required much larger teams): one team pulled a limber that attached to the trail of the gun to form a four-wheeled wagon of sorts; the other pulled a limber that attached to a caisson. The large number of horses posed a logistical challenge for the artillery, because they had to be fed, maintained, and replaced when worn out or injured. Artillery horses were generally selected second from the pool of high quality animals; cavalry mounts were the best horses. The life expectancy of an artillery horse was under eight months. They suffered from disease, exhaustion from long marches—typically 16 miles (25.8 km) in 10 hours—and battle injuries.

Horses panicked easier than men when subjected to counter-battery fire, and their movements were made difficult because they were harnessed together into teams. Robert Stiles wrote about Union counter-battery fire striking a Confederate battery on Benner's Hill at the Battle of Gettysburg:

Such a scene as it presented—guns dismounted and disabled, carriages splintered and crushed, ammunition chests exploded, limbers upset, wounded horses plunging and kicking, dashing out the brains of men tangled in the harness; while cannoneers with pistols were crawling around through the wreck shooting the struggling horses to save the lives of wounded men.

The term "horse artillery" refers to the faster moving artillery batteries that typically supported cavalry regiments. The term "flying artillery" is sometimes used as well. In such batteries, the artillerymen were all mounted, in contrast to batteries in which the artillerymen walked alongside their guns (although regular artillerymen would sometimes jump onto the backs of their team when rapid battlefield movement was required, and they typically rode upon the limbers, caissons or supply wagons while on the march). A prominent organization of such artillery in the Union Army was the U.S. Horse Artillery Brigade.

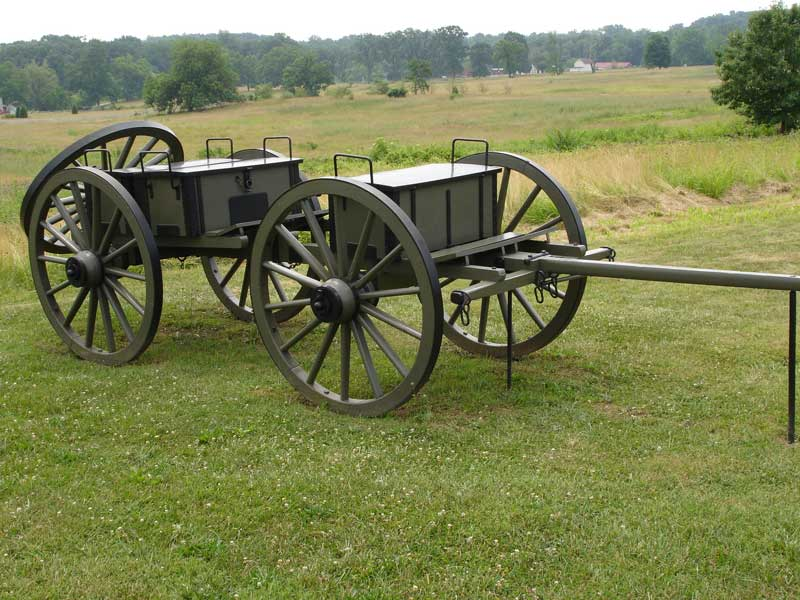
Limber (right) and Caisson

=== Limber ===
The limber was a two-wheeled carriage that carried an ammunition chest. It was connected directly behind the team of six horses and towed either a gun or a caisson. In either case, the combination provided the equivalent of a four-wheeled vehicle, which distributed the load over two axles but was easier to maneuver on rough terrain than a four-wheeled wagon. The combination of a Napoleon gun and a packed limber weighed 3,865 pounds (1,753.1 kg).

== History and organization ==
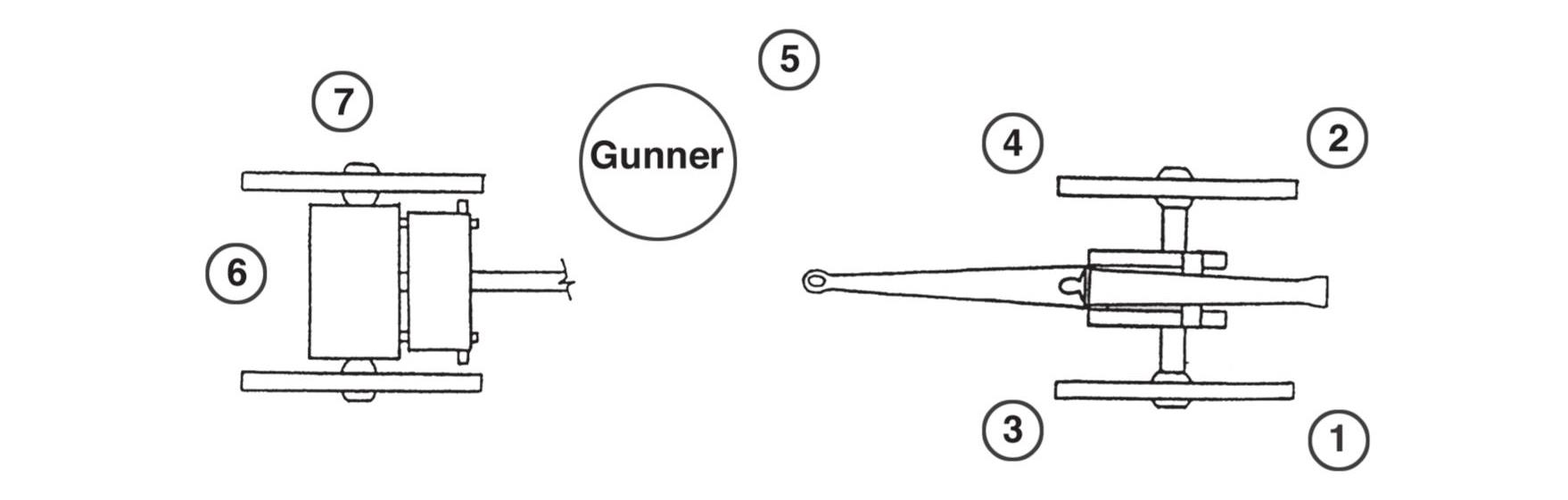

The above diagram shows the typical gun crew of a Civil War cannon. Each cannoneer was numbered and played an important role in the firing sequence when the order "Commence fire" was given:

- Gunner: Gave the order "Load" to load the cannon and sighted it at the target.
- Number One: Sponged the barrel clean and rammed the round to the breech.
- Number Two: Loaded the round into the cannon.
- Number Three: Covered the vent with his thumb to prevent premature detonation and, when the cannon was sighted and loaded, used a vent prick to puncture the cartridge bag.
- Number Four: With the cartridge bag punctured, attached a lanyard to a friction primer and inserted the primer into the vent, then pulled the lanyard when the order "Fire" was given.
- Number Five: Carried the round from Number Seven at the limber to Number Two at the muzzle.
- Number Six: Cut the fuse for the round, if necessary.
- Number Seven: Gave the round to Number Five to carry to Number Two.

=== Union artillery ===
The Union Army entered the war with a strong advantage in artillery. It had ample manufacturing capacity in Northern factories, and it had a well-trained and professional officer corps manning that branch of the service. Brig. Gen. Henry J. Hunt, who was the chief of artillery for the Army of the Potomac for part of the war, was well recognized as a most efficient organizer of artillery forces, and he had few peers in the practice of the sciences of gunnery and logistics. Another example was John Gibbon, the author of the influential Artillerist's Manual published in 1863 (although Gibbon would achieve considerably more fame as an infantry general during the war). Shortly after the outbreak of war, Brig. Gen. James Wolfe Ripley, Chief of Ordnance, ordered the conversion of old smoothbores into rifled cannon and the manufacture of Parrott guns.

The basic unit of Union artillery was the battery, which usually consisted of six guns. Attempts were made to ensure that all six guns in a battery were of the same caliber, simplifying training and logistics. Each gun, or "piece", was operated by a gun crew of eight, plus four additional men to handle the horses and equipment. Two guns operating under the control of a lieutenant were known as a "section". The battery of six guns was commanded by a captain. Artillery brigades composed of five batteries were commanded by colonels and supported the infantry organizations as follows: each infantry corps was supported directly by one artillery brigade and, in the case of the Army of the Potomac, five brigades formed the Artillery Reserve. In addition, George McClellan had assigned one regular army battery to every four volunteer batteries to provide an example of regular army professionalism to them. This arrangement, championed by Hunt, allowed artillery to be massed in support of the entire army's objective, rather than being dispersed all across the battlefield. An example of the tension between infantry commanders and artillery commanders was during the massive Confederate bombardment of Cemetery Ridge on 3 July 1863, the third day of the Battle of Gettysburg. Hunt had difficulty persuading the infantry commanders, such as Maj. Gen. Winfield S. Hancock, against using all of their artillery ammunition in response to the Confederate bombardment, understanding the value to the defenders of saving the ammunition for the infantry assault to come, Pickett's Charge.

At the start of the war, the U.S. Army had 2,283 guns on hand, but only about 10% of these were field artillery pieces. By the end of the war, the army had 3,325 guns, of which 53% were field pieces. The army reported as "supplied to the army during the war" the following quantities: 7,892 guns, 6,335,295 artillery projectiles, 2,862,177 rounds of fixed artillery ammunition, 45,258 tons of lead metal, and 13,320 tons of gunpowder.

=== Confederate artillery ===
The South was at a relative disadvantage to the North for deployment of artillery. The industrial North had far greater capacity for manufacturing weapons, and the Union blockade of Southern ports prevented many foreign arms from reaching the Southern armies. The Confederacy had to rely to a significant extent on captured Union artillery pieces (either taken on the battlefield or by capturing armories, such as Harpers Ferry); it is estimated that two-thirds of all Confederate field artillery was captured from the Union. Confederate cannons built in the South often suffered from a shortage of quality metals and shoddy workmanship. Another disadvantage was the quality of ammunition as the fuses needed for detonating shells and cases were frequently inaccurate, causing premature or delayed explosions. Coupled with the Union gunners' initial competence and experience gained as the war progressed, this led Southern forces to dread assaults on Northern positions backed up by artillery. A Southern officer observed, "The combination of Yankee artillery with Rebel infantry would make an army that could be beaten by no one." Union artillery was used on the Army of Northern Virginia to devastating effect on a number of occasions, particularly during the Seven Days Battles (particularly the Battle of Malvern Hill) and Gettysburg.

Because of his artillery weakness, Robert E. Lee tended to favor fighting in locations such as the Wilderness that limited the effectiveness of long-range Union artillery and led to close-quarters combat, where the Army of Northern Virginia's large number of smoothbore guns were more effective.

Confederate batteries usually consisted of four guns, in contrast to the Union's six. This was a matter of necessity, because guns were always in short supply. And, unlike the Union, batteries frequently consisted of mixed caliber weapons. During the first half of the war Confederate batteries were generally attached to infantry brigades. A reorganization of the Confederate artillery resulted in batteries being organized into battalions (versus the Union brigades) of three batteries each in the Western Theater of the war and generally four batteries each in the Eastern Theater of the war. These artillery battalions were assigned to the direct support of infantry divisions. Each infantry corps was assigned two battalions as an Artillery Reserve, but there was no such Reserve at the army level. The chief of artillery for Robert E. Lee's Army of Northern Virginia, Brig. Gen. William N. Pendleton, had considerable difficulty massing artillery for best effect because of this organization.

After reorganizing the Army of Northern Virginia into two corps led by James Longstreet and "Stonewall" Jackson following the Seven Days Battles, Lee assigned each corps two reserve artillery battalions in addition to the individual batteries assigned to each infantry brigade. The officers in charge of the reserve battalions were all drawn from Longstreet's command, which displeased Jackson as he had not been allowed to select his own men for the corps artillery reserve, but he accepted it without complaining.

== Battles ==
Although virtually all battles of the Civil War included artillery, some battles are known better than others for significant artillery engagements, arguably critical to the overall outcome:

- Battle of Shiloh
- Battle of Antietam
- Battle of Chancellorsville
- Battle of Stones River
- Battle of Fredericksburg
- Battle of Gettysburg
- Battle of Malvern Hill
- Battle of Nashville
- Battle of Wilson's Creek
- Battle of Pea Ridge
- Battle of Prairie Grove

== Civil War artillerists ==
Not nearly as well known as their infantry and cavalry counterparts, a small group of officers excelled at artillery deployment, organization, and the science of gunnery:

- Edward Porter Alexander
- John Milton Brannan
- Thomas H. Carter
- Alonzo Cushing
- John Gibbon
- Charles E. Hazlett
- Henry Jackson Hunt
- Stonewall Jackson
- Joseph W. Latimer
- Freeman McGilvery
- John Mendenhall
- "Willy" Pegram
- John Pelham
- William N. Pendleton
- George Storrs
- Charles S. Wainwright
- Reuben Lindsay Walker
- William M. Edgar
- John Morton

== Civil War artillery organizations ==
- Danville Artillery
- Fluvanna Artillery
- Washington Artillery
- Pointe Coupee Artillery

== See also ==
- Wiard rifle 6- and 12-pounder weapons deployed in limited quantities
- Samuel Ringgold (US Army officer)
- Civil War Defenses of Washington
- Siege artillery in the American Civil War
- Field Artillery Branch (United States)
- Double-barreled cannon
- Field artillery
