= Star Trek: Away Team =

2001 video game

- Developer: Reflexive Entertainment
- Publisher: Activision
- Director: John Price
- Producer: Lars Brubaker
- Designers: Ion Hardie; Zach Young
- Programmer: John Price
- Artist: Chad Max
- Writers: Eric Dallaire; Ion Hardie
- Composer: Danny Pelfrey
- Series: Star Trek
- Platform: Windows
- Release: NA: March 20, 2001; EU: March 30, 2001
- Genre: Real-time tactics
- Modes: Single-player, multiplayer

Star Trek: Away Team is an isometric real-time tactics video game developed by Reflexive Entertainment and published by Activision. The game was initially released in March 2001 for personal computers using Microsoft Windows in North America. The game is set in the Star Trek universe, after the end of the Dominion War seen in the television series Star Trek: Deep Space Nine. It features a range of new characters, set on board the USS Incursion with voice appearances by Brent Spiner and Michael Dorn as Lieutenant Commander Data and Ambassador Worf, respectively. The game received mixed reviews, with criticism directed at the graphics, elements of the gameplay including the lack of any artificial intelligence, and the limited length of the game.

In 2023, the game was one of eight Star Trek titles re-released on GOG.com in celebration of the franchise's 57th anniversary.

== Gameplay ==
Star Trek: Away Team is a squad-based real-time tactics video game played in a three-quarters isometric view, in a similar manner to other games such as Baldur's Gate. The maps do not have a fog of war, allowing the player to be able to view the positions of all enemies on the map at any one time. Other features allow the player to see how far the enemies can both see or hear. The player controls between four and six characters at a time out of a selection of seventeen. Each character has different abilities, such as the Vulcan mind meld, or equipment with the exception of a basic phaser, and the player can assemble a team prior to each mission to take account of the requirements of that level. Each character has a specialisation as seen in the Star Trek franchise, such as science, security, command, medical or engineering. This broadly defines the abilities of the characters, with security personnel being better in combat, while science crew can use cloaking fields and engineers can repair equipment. The death of any characters requires the mission to be restarted, something that was not originally included in the game.

The game involves several stealth related abilities, such as decoys, and holographic projectors. The aim was for the missions to have multiple means of completing them, with the player able to use either force or stealth and abilities to complete a mission. Some missions are broken down into primary and secondary objectives. Whilst the completion of the secondary objectives were optional, the completion of them unlocked either an improvement to existing equipment or the awarding of new items. There is no experience gaining features and characters do not change over time. The player's interface during the missions has a series of character portraits on the left side of the screen, whilst the icons for the character's items and abilities are on the bottom right. Actions are controlled via a number of buttons on the bottom left. The player can left click on the mouse to select items in the game, while right click brings up a menu to issue orders to the crew members. There are also a series of hot keys for a variety of actions, such as the use of hyposprays or to select phaser rifles. The multi-player mode is based on co-operative play for up to six players on a local area network.

== Synopsis ==
=== Setting ===
The game is set in the Star Trek universe, in the same period as the television series Star Trek: The Next Generation, Deep Space Nine and Voyager, 2 years after the Dominion War. It follows the adventures of a team of Starfleet crew on board the USS Incursion, which is sanctioned by Starfleet as a special operations group. The ship is equipped with a holographic device, which allows it to appear as any other vessel. Amongst the eighteen missions in the game, it see the team go up against Klingons, Borg, Romulans and the Federation amongst others. Missions are set on the Klingon homeworld, a Borg cube, Starfleet Academy and a Starfleet starship.

=== Characters ===
Michael Dorn and Brent Spiner lend their voices to the characters of Ambassador Worf and Lieutenant Commander Data, roles they previously portrayed in Star Trek: The Next Generation, the respective films and, in the case of Worf, Star Trek: Deep Space Nine. Data acts as a technical advisor to the team for each mission, while Worf is an Ambassador to the Klingon Empire. Other actors who provided voices for the game include Alexander Enberg and Kim Rhodes. Rhodes appeared in the Star Trek: Voyager sixth-season episode "Ashes to Ashes", and Enberg appeared in the recurring role of Ensign Vorik in that series.

== Development ==
Activision approached Reflexive Entertainment to create the game, whose previous work was the 2D space Swarm (1998). Reflexive had created a new game engine for Zax: The Alien Hunter (2001), and saw potential in its reuse. The developers described the game as "sort of the Commandos/S.W.A.T. team of the Federation. They have been specially trained with prototype weapons and technologies to undergo the most extreme missions."

Paramount Studios had concerns about the game, and wanted their intellectual property to be protected by the developers. This resulted in permission sought from Paramount to add new Star Trek-based technologies and weapons to the game and to approve the script. Activision presented a demonstration of Away Team at the E3 convention in May 2000, alongside Star Trek: Voyager – Elite Force and Bridge Commander.

== Reception ==
Reception

Aggregate score
Aggregator	Score
Metacritic	64/100

Review scores
Publication	Score
AllGame	2/5
Computer Games Strategy Plus	2/5
Computer Gaming World	2.5/5
EP Daily	6.5/10
Game Informer	4.5/10
GameRevolution	C
GameSpot	5.5/10
GameSpy	66%
GameZone	6/10
IGN	6.5/10
Next Generation	4/5
PC Gamer (US)	49%

Star Trek: Away Team received "mixed" reviews according to the review aggregation website Metacritic. Some reviews such as The Independent were positive, saying that "Away Team will have gamers and Trekkies champing at the bit." The Birmingham Mail described the game as "satisfyingly challenging and engaging". Daily Radar called the game "respectable", and thought that both the gameplay and plot were "fun and familiar but hardly new or daring". The review called the voice acting "first class", and said overall that it was a "solid and fun experience". John Lee of NextGen said of the game, "Comparison to Commandos is inevitable, and even though this dirty dozen carries phasers, it's a terrific, enjoyable challenge."

However, others were less positive. There was criticism of the linear storyline, with IGN comparing the game to the X-COM franchise saying that Away Team didn't allow for any customisation and the pre-made characters had no impact on the storyline. Because of this, the review also criticised the role-playing experience of the game, saying that "Even a game like Panzer General provides more role-playing than Away Team." Computer Games Strategy Plus also compared the game to X-COM, with elements of Commandos: Behind Enemy Lines added. It said that the lack of artificial intelligence meant that the need to pause the game repeatedly to give commands resulted in order to allow the characters to fight back against attacks. GameSpot called that lack of artificial intelligence a "giant step back from the real-time combat in X-COM: Apocalypse". The Washington Post found that the characterisation was lacking compared to Star Trek: Voyager – Elite Force.

The graphics were also criticised, due to the locked aspect ratio of the maps and the pixelization this caused when the player zoomed in, which was described as "unpleasent" by IGN. It also had the effect on game play that the individual characters could only be easily selected by clicking on the portraits as they were "so small as to be nearly indistinguishable from one another" on the map according to IGN. GameSpot also raised similar points, but still called the graphics and sound as the best features of the game.
