= RLW =

RLW is the abbreviation for two different rugby league magazines, one in the UK and the other in Australia:

- Rugby League Week, an Australian publication
- Rugby League World, a British publication

== In science and engineering ==
- Regularized long-wave equation, a model for surface gravity waves which are long and propagate unidirectionally

== Other ==
- Ricochet Lost Worlds, a video game
  - Ricochet Lost Worlds: Recharged, a video game sequel
