= Outer Terror =

2023 video game

- Developers: Salt & Pixel
- Publisher: VoxPop Games
- Engine: Construct 3
- Platform: Windows; PlayStation 4/5, Xbox X/S, Nintendo Switch
- Release: April 20, 2023, April 12, 2024
- Genres: Roguelike, shoot 'em up
- Modes: Single-player, multiplayer

Outer Terror is a roguelike, bullet hell video game developed by Salt & Pixel and published by VoxPop Games.

The game is structured as a pulp-horror anthology series, where each level is its own self-contained comic book styled story. It features both online and offline co-op play.

Outer Terror was released on Microsoft Windows on April 20, 2023.

== Gameplay ==
Outer Terror's core gameplay has been described as a "bullet hell with roguelite elements."

The player takes control of an automatically attacking character and is set against waves of continuously spawning enemies. Players can survive the waves for a set period of time or complete quests for alternate win conditions. The game shares various similarities to the 2003 game, Crimsonland

Every chapter features a different pair of playable characters, as the game was designed with co-op play in mind. Each of the 10 playable characters has a unique ability and a different starting weapon.

The player can also choose to take manual aim allowing them to control the direction most weapons fire.

The player can stack different weapons together for a more powerful effect, although weapons and upgrades are randomized.

The game features both offline and online co-op.

== Development ==
Outer Terror was designed as a spiritual successor to one of Salt & Pixel's earlier games, "Gray Death", which was previously published on the VoxPop Games platform in 2021.

Outer Terror was published by VoxPop Games, and it was the first original game to make use of VoxPop's middleware tools, and the first to be funded through VoxPop's Indie Fund. The version of the game available on the VoxPop Games' store will contain exclusive content.

Outer Terror was featured as part of the MOME (Made in New York) New York State Pavilion demo booth at GDC 2023.

== Reception ==
Johanna Koziol of Screen Rant criticized Outer Terror for its lack of quality-of-life features, but praised the game's core gameplay loop, tone, and characters, saying "Outer Terror's unique horror spin on the rouge-lite genre makes it a breath of fresh air.".

Thomas Wilde of Bloody Disgusting praised Outer Terror's retro comic book aesthetic and co-op features, but referred to the game as "consistently under baked," and criticized the game for its early release glitches and animation errors.

Outer Terror for PC stands at a 73 overall Metacritic score as of April 2024.

Outer Terror released for home console on PlayStation 4/5, Xbox X/S, and Nintendo Switch on April 12, 2024
