= Big Kahuna (series) =

- Genre: Puzzle
- Developer: Reflexive Entertainment
- Publisher: Reflexive Entertainment
- Platforms: Microsoft Windows, Mac OS X, Linux, Wii
- First release: Big Kahuna Reef; 2004
- Latest release: Big Kahuna Reef 3; 2012

Big Kahuna is a series of puzzle video games created by Reflexive Entertainment. Four games have been released in the series: Big Kahuna Reef, a tile-matching game, in 2004 for the PC; Big Kahuna Words, a boggle-style puzzle game released in 2005 for PC and 2008 for iOS; Big Kahuna Reef 2, a three in a row matchmaking game released in 2006 for PC; Big Kahuna Party, a WiiWare tile-based party game released in 2008; and Big Kahuna Reef 3, the last tile-based game in June 2012. All of the games in the series feature a Hawaiian theme, with oceans, exotic fish, and tiki heads.

Around 7 December 2017, the official website that hosted all user-made levels and the forums for both the Ricochet (Ricochet Infinity, Ricochet Lost Worlds and Ricochet Lost Worlds: Recharged) and the Big Kahuna series were permanently shut down because they were no longer sustainable to run.

== Games ==
=== Big Kahuna Reef ===
Big Kahuna Reef is a match-making casual game that involves breaking boxes in order to progress past each level. The game was released by Reflexive Entertainment in December 2004 for PC and November 2005 for Mac.

=== Big Kahuna Words ===
Big Kahuna Words is a boggle-style puzzle game played on a Microsoft Windows PC, and written and distributed by Reflexive Entertainment. In the game, one must break all the boxes by making words (akin to Boggle) in order to progress through the game. Released in November 2005, it was then later published by Magmic Games on BlackBerry OS and iOS in May 2008 and December 2009 respectively.

=== Big Kahuna Reef 2 ===
Big Kahuna Reef 2 is the sequel to the original Big Kahuna Reef. This casual game is a three in a row matchmaking game. The player must make strings of objects in order to break the boxes beneath; when all of the boxes are broken the level is complete. Like the title before it, Big Kahuna Reef 2 has thousands of user-made levels that can be downloaded in game, in addition to the standard levels made by the developer. Big Kahuna Reef 2 also introduced power-ups (bombs), hence the extended title Chain Reaction. The game was released by Reflexive Entertainment in June 2006 for PC and May 2008 for Mac.

=== Big Kahuna Party ===
Big Kahuna Party includes a single-player mode and an up to 4 player multiplayer mode. Each level resembles oceanic holiday for players as they match up sea-themed objects. Players have to discover new and exotic fish and explore all 99 levels. Players can swap tiles using either just the Wii Remote, or with both the Wii Remote and the Nunchuk. Big Kahuna Party also features explosives, which are created as players make matches of 5 or more. They will vary in sizes from little sticks of dynamite to huge nuclear bombs used to clear out large sections of hard to reach level tiles. The game was released by Reflexive Entertainment on 15 December 2008.

IGN cited that it's an "uninspired rehash" with little lasting appeal. Wiiloveit.com, however, stated that it has a nice party element, serving as "the main draw" of the release.

=== Big Kahuna Reef 3 ===
Big Kahuna Reef 3 is the latest installment of Big Kahuna Reef in the Big Kahuna series, maintaining the popular bomb power-ups introduced in its predecessor, Big Kahuna Reef 2. In contrast to its predecessors, this matchmaking casual game does not include a level editor, but it brings new elements such as talismans and charms, designed to assist players in completing levels, multiplying scores, and encountering various surprises. Players will engage with only two level sets called "Kahuna Quest" and "Tiki Challenges", and can also enjoy four entertaining minigames. The game was released by Reflexive Entertainment in June 2012 for PC.
