= Starscape =

- Steam cover art
- Developer: Moonpod
- Publishers: WW: Moonpod; CIS: Snowball Studios
- Designer: Mark Featherstone
- Platform: Microsoft Windows
- Release: 29 June 2004
- Genre: Multidirectional shooter
- Mode: Single-player

Starscape is a 2D space combat shoot 'em up video game developed by Moonpod games and published in 2003 as shareware. The player character is the sole remaining fighter pilot on the space station Aegis after its warp drive is influenced by aliens, ripping it into another dimension. The objective is to survive and to return.

Starscape features a plotless skirmish mode and a difficulty level where save games are automatically updated to reflect the loss of ships. Though the asteroid mining has been criticized as too tedious and time-consuming, the battle sequences and graphics have received praise.

In Russian-speaking territories, Starscape is named Космическая одиссея (literal translation: Space Odyssey) and features Russian voice acting. It was published by Snowball Studios.

== Plot ==
The game is set in the 23rd century, and starts with the crew of an exploration vessel called the Aegis testing a new machine called a dimensional drive. The experiment, however, goes horribly wrong because a malevolent bio-mechanical race called the Archnid somehow tampered with the machine, resulting in the Aegis and its crew being sent into another dimension.

The pilot of a small ship that was on the Aegis (controlled the player) meets up with the ship. At this point, it's revealed that the Aegis was attacked by the Archnid, heavily damaged, and the dimension drive has been stolen. The player must then mine resources to repair the Aegis, their own ship, and recover the dimension drive, which the Archnid broke into five pieces, hoping to reverse engineer the technology and use it to escape.

Though optional, the player can do some side quests with a race of machines called the Xenarch. After completing missions for them, they Xenarch will gradually reveal information about themselves and the Archnid. The Xenarch reveal that, the Archnid were once an organic race that was trapped in the dimension. Realizing they would die because they couldn't escape, most of them fused with machines to become immortal, leading to insanity. The Xenarch were created by the few that didn't fuse with the machine to kill the Archnid, but the Xenarch failed in their task. Doing this reveals to the crew of the Aegis how dangerous the Archnid are, and further motivates them to get the pieces of their dimension drive so they can make sure the Archnid cannot threaten the normal universe.

The default character name of 'Jameson' is taken from the game Elite.

== Gameplay ==
Most of the game time is spent in a top-down view as the player's ship fights off attackers and collects resources from asteroids and from some of the destroyed enemy vessels. The setting is divided into areas of varying sizes, and the fighter can freely maneuver in one but not cross the boundaries.

While in essence quite simple, the addition of the space station enriches gameplay considerably. The Aegis is present in all non-boss battles and while it's quite durable, its destruction loses the game. Docking with it is necessary to unload resources, perform repairs on either the ship or the station and to travel between areas. In addition to the aforementioned repairs, the Aegis can spend acquired resources on both researching and constructing new tools and weaponry, which require allotments of the station's limited manpower that in turn can be increased by finding and rescuing rare survivors in the action sequences. The player also designs the fighters, balancing attack and defense with power, maneuverability, available size and costs. The station can maintain up to three craft, though only one can be flown at a time. Over time, the Aegis can be outfitted with turrets and a cannon, while the fighters go from - essentially - airtight bathtubs to pocket battleships.

== Reception ==
- Scored 80% in PC Gamer UK magazine.
- 9/10 and Editor's Choice awarded by Game Chronicles Magazine, who said it was "one of the best little known titles I've run across".
- Starscape was inducted into the Home of the Underdogs hall of belated fame in June 2005.

== See also ==
- Escape Velocity
- Swarm
