= Lionheart: Legacy of the Crusader =

2003 video game

- Developer: Reflexive Entertainment
- Publisher: Black Isle Studios
- Producer: Lars Brubaker
- Designer: Ion Hardie
- Programmer: James C. Smith
- Artist: Jeff McAteer
- Writer: Eric Dallaire
- Composer: Inon Zur
- Platform: Windows
- Release: NA: 12 August 2003; AU: 26 August 2003; UK: 12 September 2003
- Genre: Action role-playing
- Modes: Single-player, multiplayer

Lionheart: Legacy of the Crusader is an action role-playing game developed by Reflexive Entertainment and published by Interplay Entertainment subsidiary Black Isle Studios for Windows, released in August 2003. The game is viewed from a 3/4 isometric camera angle. It focuses on a protagonist, controlled by the player, as he travels on a quest that constitutes the central focus of the game. The plot stipulates a rift in reality that drastically altered medieval history by allowing demons and other similar beings to enter the mortal realm. During the game, the protagonist encounters and interacts with numerous historical figures such as Joan of Arc, Leonardo da Vinci and Galileo Galilei who are represented as non-player characters.

Lionheart utilizes the SPECIAL role-playing system, which was first used in the Fallout series, and in this game functions primarily in adding points to specific skills in separate trees to strengthen a character's "Spiritkind", which has a personality and nature chosen by the player at the start of the game.

== Gameplay ==
As Lionheart implements the SPECIAL system, the character creation is similar to that of the Fallout series. Players begin by setting the values of their characters' strength, perception, endurance, charisma, intelligence, agility and luck, and selecting "traits", which alter a character's inherent abilities for either better or worse, for the duration of the game. In addition, the player must distribute points to "skills" – abilities which a character uses to achieve various effects. One skill, "diplomacy," allows the player to talk their way out of situations gone awry, while another, "sneak", allows the player to move undetected by enemies. Unlike the Fallout series, Lionheart also allows the player to select magical skills – an example being "discord", which turns hostile enemies against one another.

Players also select "perks" during the course of the game – abilities similar to traits, which affect a character's abilities in some form. For example, the ability "Superior Senses" grants the player character a +1 bonus to his or her perception and +15 skill points in the "find traps/secret doors" skill.

Another element newly introduced by Lionheart is the player's selection of a "Spiritkind" for their character, which is done during character generation at the game's start. A Spiritkind is a spirit, which is either demonic, elemental or bestial, that resides in the player character and occasionally rouses to explain happenings or gameplay mechanics, or advance the plot.

The character generated by the player is the only character a player has direct control over, and though characters will occasionally join a player's adventuring party, they are AI-controlled without exception.

== Plot ==
The setting of Lionheart is an alternate history created by the occurrence of the Disjunction, a rip in the fabric of time that introduces magic into the world. This event occurred when Richard the Lionheart massacred prisoners at the Siege of Acre during the Third Crusade, a decision exploited by a mysterious source to fuel a ritual that tore the fabric of reality and caused magic to enter the world from other dimensions.

The game takes place in 1588 and initially set in an alternate history version of Barcelona. In this time, the Spanish Armada is almost set to invade England, and the Inquisition is rampant. Lionheart features several Renaissance figures who make ahistorical appearances in the game, including Miguel de Cervantes, William Shakespeare, Galileo Galilei, Niccolò Machiavelli, and Leonardo da Vinci.

The plot of Lionheart sees the player character, discovered to be a descendent of Richard the Lionheart, inherit the powers obtained during the Disjunction. Players follow the story through aligning with one of the four main factions in the game – the Knights Templar, the Inquisition, the Knights of Saladin and the Wielders – and are tasked with stopping an attempt to permanently open the dimensional rift, and alter the course of European history.

== Development ==
Reflexive Entertainment was approached by Black Isle Studios to develop a game after playing their previous title Zax: The Alien Hunter, an isometric game using the same engine. Ion Hardie states Black Isle originally wanted Reflexive Entertainment to develop a game in the vein of Fallout using the SPECIAL system. Chris Avellone recalls the decision to use SPECIAL was an attempt to "try and help boost sales by leveraging Fallout fan interest".

Production of Lionheart was strained, with both developer and publisher in financial stress. Ion Hardie notes Reflexive Entertainment was "literally one day away from making hard choices that might have shut us down for good when we got the contract (for Lionheart)". Interplay also bore significant financial issues that prevented them from providing the developer with milestone payments, with Hardie stating "(Interplay) had issues getting us the initial payment.

=== Release ===
Lionheart went gold on 16 July 2003. As with other Interplay titles at the time, Vivendi Universal Games handled North American distribution while Avalon Interactive handled European distribution. The game was released in 2003 in North America on 12 August, Australia on 26 August, and the United Kingdom on 12 September.

== Reception ==
Reception

Aggregate score
Aggregator	Score
Metacritic	57/100

Review scores
Publication	Score
Computer Gaming World	1.5/5
Game Informer	8.5/10
GameRevolution	D
GameSpot	6.5/10
GameSpy	2/5
GameZone	7.2/10
IGN	6.8/10
PC Gamer (UK)	72%
PC Gamer (US)	61%
X-Play	3/5

Lionheart received "mixed" reviews according to the review aggregation website Metacritic. GameSpot's Greg Kasavin noted that although Lionheart seems to promote diverse character creation, the significant focus on monster-infested areas "all but forces you to play as some sort of combat-oriented character." The game was also criticised for its attempts at promoting "Diablo-style," hack-and-slash gameplay after a more dialogue-driven approach in the earlier stages of the game. IGN's Barry Brenesal wrote, "the problem of deciding what kind of game it really wants to be, RPG or Diablo clone, is probably the most serious problem it's got." He continued that Lionheart "feels like a good game got lost somewhere en route, and ended up being pushed out the door with some basic features missing." RPGamer's Steven Bellotti assessed that the game "starts out so promising," but "once you get out of Barcelona and into the wider world, [it] falls flat on its face."

Conversely the game was praised for both its musical score, which was described as "excellent," and voice-acting, which was exclaimed to be "top-notch." The SPECIAL system-fueled character creation was called "great."
