= Rikochet =

Rikochet may refer to:

- Rikochet, the working title for the 2014 video game Rekoil
- Rikochet, a character from the TV show ¡Mucha Lucha!
- Rikochet, professional wrestler; see WWC World Junior Heavyweight Championship

== See also ==
- Ricochet (disambiguation)
