= Ricochet =

Rebound of a projectile off a surface

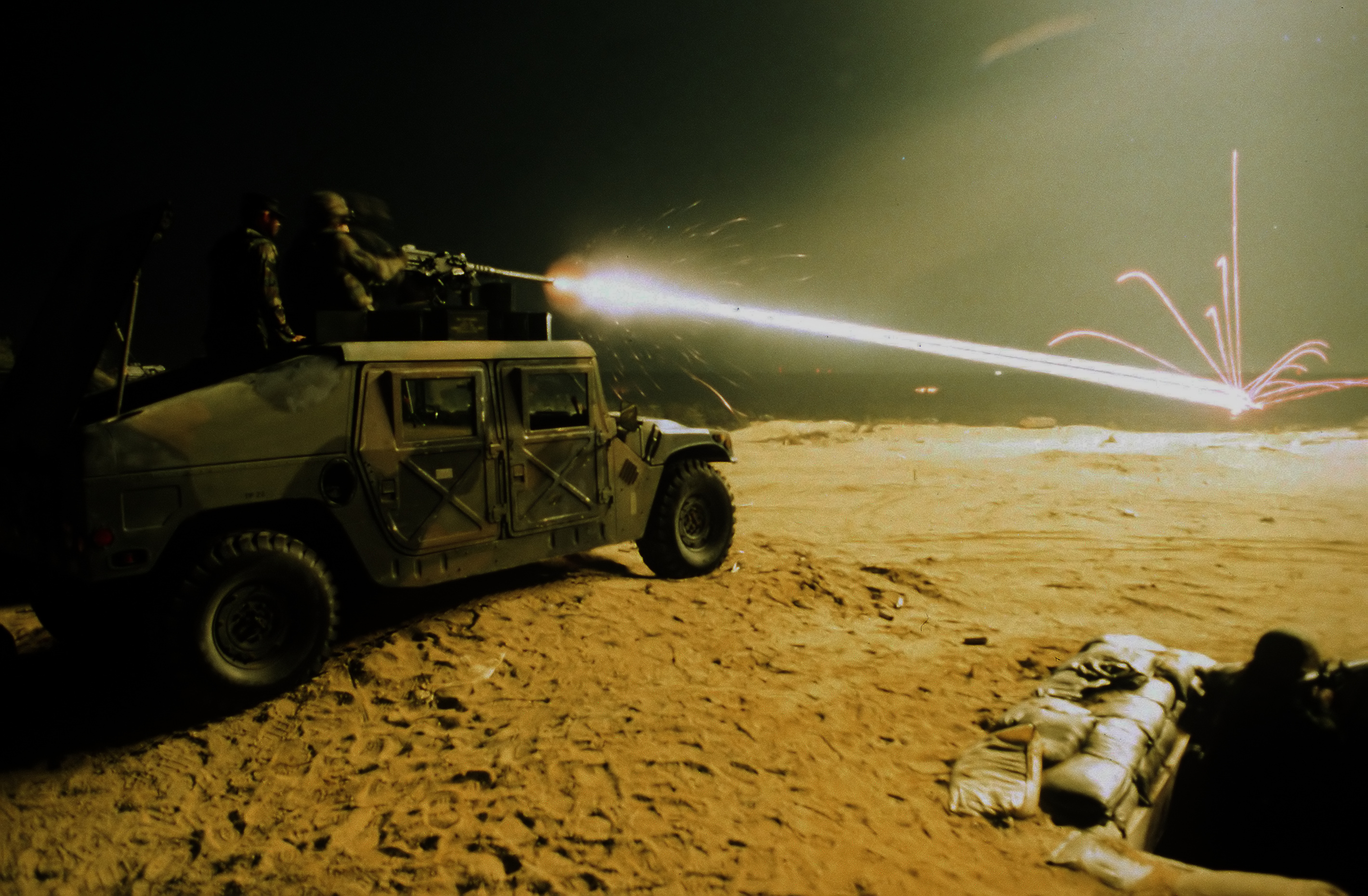
Tracer elements separating from M2 Browning .50 BMG machine gun rounds after hitting the target or backstop.

A ricochet (/ˈrɪkəʃeɪ/ RIK-ə-shay; French: [ʁikɔʃɛ]) is a rebound, bounce, or skip off a surface, particularly in the case of a projectile. Most ricochets are caused by accident and while the force of the deflection decelerates the projectile, it can still be energetic and almost as dangerous as before the deflection. The possibility of ricochet is one of the reasons for the common firearms safety rule "Never shoot a bullet at a flat, hard surface." Ricochets can occur with any caliber, but short or round ricocheting bullets may not produce the audible whine caused by tumbling irregular shapes. Ricochets are a hazard of shooting because, for as long as they retain sufficient velocity, ricocheting bullets or bullet fragments may cause collateral damage to animals, objects, or even the person who fired the shot.

== Variables ==
Ricochets occur when a bullet or bullet fragment is deflected by an object rather than penetrating and becoming embedded in that object. Ricochet behavior may vary with bullet shape, bullet material, spin, velocity (and distance), target material and the angle of incidence.

=== Velocity ===
High-velocity rifle cartridges have higher probability of bullet penetration, because increased energy released by an identical bullet may fracture or temporarily melt the target at the point of impact. Alternatively, the same energy release may melt and/or disintegrate the bullet to reduce size and range of deflected particles. Ricochets are more likely with handgun cartridges and low velocity rifle cartridges such as .22 long rifle. Buckshot and shotgun slugs have similarly high ricochet probability, but ricochet range of smaller shot is lower than intact rifle or handgun bullet ricochets.

=== Bullet ===
Sectional density, or mass of the bullet divided by the frontal area of the bullet, increases penetration of resistant surfaces. Elongated, spin-stabilized bullets fired from rifled firearms have greater sectional density than spherical bullets of the same diameter made from the same material; and elongated rifle cartridge bullets have greater sectional density than short bullets of the same diameter handgun cartridges. Bullet velocity is reduced by as much as 35% by each ricochet deflection, and velocity is further reduced by air resistance as cohesive bullet fragments often produce an audible whine tumbling after losing stability.

=== Target material ===
Comparative hardness and density determine the results of collisions with bullets. Bullets tend to penetrate low density materials like air with little deflection, although friction causes rotated projectiles to drift in the direction of rifling twist as the bullet falls through the atmosphere under the influence of gravity. Ricochets may be similarly deflected in the direction of rotation of the side of a spin-stabilized bullet contacting a resistant surface. Dense objects tend to prevail in collisions with less dense objects; so dense bullets tend to penetrate less dense materials, and dense materials tend to deflect light bullets. Resistance to penetration can be evaluated as the sectional density of the target material along the axis of bullet movement in front of the bullet. Metallic foil will be more easily penetrated than metal ingots, and sectional density of sheet metal increases as orientation of the sheet diverges from perpendicular to, toward parallel with, the bullet path. Bullets are more likely to ricochet off flat, hard surfaces such as concrete, rock or steel, but a ricochet can occur from irregular surfaces within heterogeneous materials including soil and vegetation. Uniformly soft, flexible materials like sand have a lower incidence of ricochet. Though it may not be intuitive, bullets easily ricochet off water; compare stone skipping.

=== Angle ===
The angle of departure, both vertically and horizontally, is difficult to calculate or predict due to the many variables involved, not the least of which is the deformation of the bullet caused by its impact with the surface it strikes. Probability of ricochet is highest from surfaces approximately parallel to the axis of bullet movement, and grazing ricochets typically depart the surface at a smaller angle than the angle of incidence (or approach). Probability of bullet penetration increases as the axis of bullet movement becomes perpendicular to the target surface; but penetration may create a depression or crater within which the bullet may ricochet more than once, possibly following the arc of the crater floor to depart the crater at a greater angle from the original surface than the angle of incidence. In an extreme case, a strong, cohesive bullet striking a nearly perpendicular elastic surface may ricochet directly back at the shooter. This situation is sometimes observed when hardened armor-piercing bullet cores fail to completely penetrate steel plate. The United States Army noted increased ricochet range after adopting the M855A1 green bullet with a larger steel core than the M855 bullet it replaced. Buckshot and subsonic bullets may be similarly reflected from rubber vehicle tires.

== Consequences ==
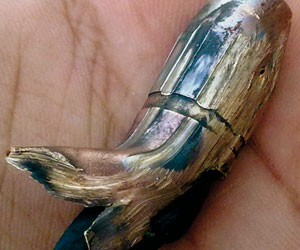
The roughened abrasions and asymmetrical jacket damage were caused when this recovered bullet ricocheted from a hard, granular surface.

Not all ricochets are accidental. Some bullets are fired to intentionally ricochet, just as in ricochets of some ball games like basketball and pool. Bullet traps at indoor shooting ranges often include durable steel plates to deflect bullets downward into a material intended to stop and capture the bullets. Cannonballs were often fired to strike the ground or water in front of their target in anticipation of ricochets which would keep the projectile at an effective distance above the ground or water surface through massed troops or ships.

The behavior of iron cannonballs documented during the era of muzzle-loading cannon may be a useful approximation for a BB gun or steel pellets fired from a shotgun, but inelastic collisions between the various shapes and materials of high-velocity bullets and the objects they may strike make bullet ricochets less predictable than the intuitive symmetry of low-velocity game spheres.

The problem with unintentional ricochets is potential damage caused to objects outside the intended path of the bullet. A responsible shooter anticipates potential bullet interactions within a cone of space around the aim point. The shooter is at the apex of the cone, and the cone is symmetrical around the intended bullet path. The angle of that cone may initially be defined by the accuracy of the firearm and the skill of the shooter; but any ricochet potential within the cone becomes the apex of a ricochet cone with a broader angle. The ground surface is a frequent source of ricochets. A bullet may be deflected more than once before it comes to rest.

Damage potential of ricochets, like bullets, is proportional to the mass of the bullet fragment and the square of its velocity. Ricochet velocity is always lower than collision velocity, but may be close to collision velocity for small angles of deflection. Ricochet mass may be similarly close to original bullet mass for full metal jacket bullets or green bullets replacing soft lead with solid copper or a steel core. Frangible bullets or lead core varmint hunting bullets are more susceptible to collision damage, and produce smaller ricochet fragments. Lower initial mass gives small fragment ricochets less damage potential, and distance of travel is reduced by more rapid loss of velocity from air resistance. Reduced ricochet range is one of the reasons the newer .17 HMR round with its frangible bullet has gained popularity against the older non-fragmenting .22 WMR.

Ricochets can be lethal. A notable death caused by ricochet was the hostage Katrina Dawson during the Lindt cafe siege in December 2014, killed by a ricochet from a police bullet when tactical officers stormed the building.

== See also ==
- Ballistics
- Gun safety
- Ricochet firing
