= Big Kahuna Reef =

2004 tile-matching puzzle video game

- Developer: Reflexive Entertainment
- Publisher: Reflexive Entertainment
- Series: Big Kahuna
- Platforms: Microsoft Windows, Mac OS, Mobile
- Release: Microsoft Windows; December 22, 2004; Mac OS; November 9, 2005; Mobile; October 11, 2006
- Genre: Puzzle
- Modes: Single-player, multiplayer

Big Kahuna Reef is a tile-matching puzzle video game developed by Reflexive Entertainment. Released in 2004, it was the first in a series of Big Kahuna titles. The look of the game is that of ocean scenes, exotic fish, and tiki heads.

== Gameplay ==
Big Kahuna Reef is set in an underwater reef with a board that is shaped like a grid, covered by various ocean-themed objects that have to be matched up in vertical or horizontal lines of three or more. To pass the level and progress, a player must break all of them by making chains of objects (such as starfish or shells) before the time runs out. Between levels, points are earned that unlock new fish and other undersea creatures. During the interludes between levels, one can create and observe their personal reef and its creatures in the Fish Screen mode.

A Relaxed Play feature allows the choice of any level, without any time limit. The game also includes an editor, giving the players an opportunity to make their own boards, making up to thousands of additional free user-created levels by people from around the world.

== Reception ==
Reception

Review scores
Publication	Score
GameSpot	8.5/10
Pocket Gamer	3/5
Gamezebo	3.5/5
Inside Mac Games	8/10
