= Reflexive Entertainment =

American video game developer (1997–2012)

- Company type: Private
- Industry: Video games
- Founded: 1997; 29 years ago
- Defunct: May 2010; 16 years ago
- Fate: Dissolved following acquisition by Amazon
- Headquarters: Lake Forest, California, United States
- Key people: Lars Brubaker; Ernie Ramirez; James C. Smith; Ion Hardie
- Products: Game development and distribution
- Parent: Amazon (2008–2010)
- Website: www.reflexive.com at the Wayback Machine (archived May 28, 2010)

Reflexive Entertainment was an American video game developer based in Lake Forest, California. The company was cofounded by Lars Brubaker, Ernie Ramirez, James C. Smith and Ion Hardie in 1997. They developed nineteen games independently (for Microsoft Windows, Xbox and Mac platforms), published two games, started distribution of downloadable casual games on its online Arcade, created a division of its Arcade entirely devoted to Mac games for Mac users and started hosting ad supported free online web browser games. In 2005, Reflexive's Wik and the Fable of Souls won three awards at the 2005 Independent Games Festival which included Innovation in Visual Art, Innovation in Game Design and the Seumas McNally Award For Independent Game Of The Year.

On October 20, 2008, Reflexive Entertainment was acquired by Amazon. On February 3, 2009, Amazon.com began hosting casual game content for internet download.

On March 31, 2010, Reflexive announced plans to stop selling games through its affiliate program in order to focus entirely on game development. In a letter sent to affiliates, CEO Brubaker stated that the program would continue its business as usual, which included web support and payment of referral fees on game sales until June 30.

== Games ==
All games are developed and published by Reflexive Entertainment unless otherwise stated.

Game title	Year released	System	Notes
Swarm	1998	Windows	
Star Trek: Away Team	2001	Windows	Published by Activision
Zax: The Alien Hunter	2001	Windows	Published by JoWooD Productions
Ricochet Xtreme	2001	Windows	
Crimsonland	2003	Windows	Developed by 10tons Entertainment
Lionheart: Legacy of the Crusader	2003	Windows	Published by Interplay Entertainment
Ricochet Lost Worlds	2004	Macintosh, Windows, Xbox (XBLA)	
Wik and the Fable of Souls	2004	Windows, Xbox 360 (XBLA)	
Ricochet Lost Worlds: Recharged	2004	Windows	
Big Kahuna Reef	2004	Macintosh, Windows	
Big Kahuna Words	2005	Windows	
Mosaic: Tomb of Mystery	2006	Windows	
Big Kahuna Reef 2	2006	Macintosh, Windows	
Monarch: The Butterfly King	2007	Windows	
Ricochet Infinity	2007	Macintosh, Windows, iPhone, PlayStation 3	
The Great Tree	2007	Windows	
Airport Mania	2008	iPhone, Macintosh, Windows, Nintendo DS	
Build In Time	2008	Macintosh, Windows	
Big Kahuna Party	2008	Wii (WiiWare)	
Miss Teri Tale: Where's Jason	2008	Macintosh, Windows	Developed by Ouat Entertainment
Music Catch	2008	iPhone, Macintosh, Windows	
Swarm Gold	2008	Macintosh, Windows	
Costume Chaos	2009	Macintosh, Windows	
A Fairy Tale	2009	Macintosh, Windows	
Sprouts Adventure	2009	Macintosh, Windows	
Simplz: Zoo	2010	Macintosh, Windows	
Demolition League	2010	Web Game (Facebook)	

== Awards ==
Ricochet Lost Worlds receives Best Action/Arcade game for 2004 award from RealNetworks

Wik and the Fable of Souls won three awards at the 2005 Independent Games Festival in San Francisco. Wik also won the 2005 Academy of Interactive Arts and Sciences Award for Downloadable Game of the Year.

Awards:

- 2005 Academy of Interactive Arts and Sciences

Downloadable Game of the Year!

- 2005 IGF Downloadable Game of the Year!

(Seumas McNally Award)

- 2005 IGF Innovation in Visual Arts
- 2005 IGF Innovation in Game Design

== Merger ==
Amazon acquired Reflexive Entertainment in October 20, 2008 and has been merged with the game development subsidiary, Amazon Game Studios, which was founded in 2012.
