= Ricochet Infinity =

2007 video game

- Developer: Reflexive Entertainment
- Publisher: Reflexive Entertainment (Note: iOS port published by Lemon Games.) (Note: PlayStation 3 version published by TikGames.)
- Producer: James C. Smith
- Programmers: James C. Smith; Lars Brubaker; Brian Fisher; Simon Hallam; Dan Ruskin; Lee Cooper; Loren Osborn
- Composer: Zach Young
- Series: Ricochet
- Platforms: Microsoft Windows; OS X iOS; PlayStation 3 (PSN)
- Release: Microsoft Windows: WW: July 31, 2007; iOS: WW: September 8, 2010; PlayStation Network: NA: January 4, 2011; EU: February 9, 2011; AU: February 9, 2011
- Genre: Breakout
- Modes: Single-player, multiplayer

Ricochet Infinity is the fourth installment of the Ricochet video game series by Reflexive Entertainment. Similarly to its predecessors, Ricochet Xtreme (2001), Ricochet Lost Worlds (2004) and Ricochet Lost Worlds: Recharged (2004), it is a Breakout clone. As in Atari's Breakout game, the purpose of each stage is destroy all the bricks on the screen. Like the rest of the games in the Ricochet series, Infinity is more stylized than Breakout, adding various power-ups and brick variations.

The "infinite" in the title stems from the fact that new stage sets have been released on a weekly basis.

A version of Ricochet Infinity published by Lemon Games for iOS was released in September 2010. The mobile version of the game makes use of motion sensitivity of the device as a gameplay mechanic. In 2011, the game was ported to PlayStation 3 via PlayStation Network as Ricochet HD, with publishing duties being handled by TikGames.

== Gameplay ==
The gameplay of Ricochet Infinity follows the previous trends. The player controls a paddle shield that attached to player ship and must keep at least one ball (called ion sphere) on screen. The objective is to break all breakable blocks in the level by hitting these blocks with the ion sphere(s), lasers or missiles. An ion sphere can be bounced on the shield. If no ion sphere remains on-screen, the player loses a life. If the player has no lives remaining, the player loses the game and must restart the stage from the beginning.

There is no storyline; instead, levels are divided into sets called planets, and completing all stages in each planet will unlocks the next planets. The planets are divided into two episodes; the first episode is Episode 1: Ricochet Infinity, which is available by default. The second one, Episode 2: Delta Quadrant, can be unlocked after completing all planets of the first episode.

In addition, players can download user-created levels, and the game includes a level editor which permits online sharing of user-created levels.

As in Ricochet Lost Worlds and Ricochet Lost Worlds: Recharged, all provided levels and most user-created levels contain items called Golden Rings. Collecting these Golden Rings can be a challenge, which is sometimes made harder with the fact that the ion spheres stop after all bricks are destroyed, even if there are still some Golden Rings remaining. Collecting these Golden Rings unlocks new ships and balls.

=== Level Editor ===
Ricochet Infinity has a revamped level editor that allows much more complicated movements etc. in a level. This level editor allows the players to create their own levels, which can be shared to the world. Unlike the other series, it has a Level Downloader to download created levels (while Ricochet Xtreme has no level editor, and Ricochet Lost Worlds and Ricochet Lost Worlds: Recharged user-created levels must be downloaded manually from the internet).

However, the ability to add custom backgrounds, bricks, environment styles and other developer build functions were removed.
