= Zax: The Alien Hunter =

2001 video game

- Developer: Reflexive Entertainment
- Publisher: JoWooD Productions
- Designer: Ion Hardie
- Platform: Windows
- Release: UK: September 28, 2001; NA: October 9, 2001
- Genre: Action
- Modes: Single-player, multiplayer

Zax: The Alien Hunter is an isometric shooter video game developed by Reflexive Entertainment, released in September 2001 for Windows.

== Plot ==
The player is Zax, an alien humanoid, who crash-lands on an unknown planet overrun by hostile robot forces, led by Om. Zax joins forces with the local tribes on the planet, the Korbo, whose people have been enslaved by Om and the robot army, to stage a rebellion. Zax must help the Korbo from total destruction, and find as much ore and parts as possible to fix his ship.

== Gameplay ==
Zax: The Alien Hunter is a shooter played in a top-down isometric perspective. Movement is controlled with the keyboard and weapon aim and fire is controlled with the mouse. The player invests minerals harvested on the surface of the planet to develop new weapons, and can also acquire power-ups that increase shields or gun power from defeated enemies, or replenish health from containers found throughout the environment. The game includes 22 missions over 100 maps. Progression is partly non-linear and relies on decisions made by the player during missions.

The game also features several multiplayer modes for up to 16 players, including 'capture the flag', 'deathmatch', and 'salvage king', which requires players to gather as much ore as they can. The multiplayer supports internet and LAN play.

== Development ==
Zax: The Alien Hunter was showcased by JoWooD Productions at E3 in May 2001. The game was marketed for its fusion of the features of Quake and Diablo.

== Reception ==
Reception

Aggregate score
Aggregator	Score
Metacritic	70/100

Review scores
Publication	Score
Computer Gaming World	1/5
Eurogamer	8/10
GameSpot	7.5
GameSpy	82%
IGN	7.7
PC PowerPlay	72%
PC Zone	47%

=== Reviews ===
Zax: The Alien Hunter received "mixed or average reviews", according to the review aggregation website Metacritic.

Positive reviews of Zax: The Alien Hunter focused on its gameplay. Louis Bedigian of GameZone stated the game was "insanely addictive", praising its multiplayer play. Ivan Sulic of IGN found the gameplay "legitimately gratifying" due to the "simply, refreshing and enjoyable" control scheme and "fast and furious" multiplayer mode. Scott Osborne of GameSpot stated that despite the simplicity of the gameplay, the game's "excellent pacing and rewarding action" made the game "refreshingly fun", noting that there is enough diversity to hold the player's interest and keep the action flowing.

Reviewers were mixed on the merits of the game's isometric presentation and graphics. Scott Osborne of GameSpot praised the game's "beautiful graphics" with "fine attention to detail" and "crisp and colourful" landscapes and creatures. Ivan Sulic of IGN also called the graphics "artistic", albeit "static" feast, but also thought that the vast majority of the environment is "purely decorative". James Lyon of PC Zone found the graphics dated.

The game also received negative reception. Jason Babler of Computer Gaming World dismissed the game as a "Diablo clone", labelling it as "the buggiest game" he had played. Scott Osborne of IGN similarly noted that the game "sounds like another Diablo wannabe, and in some ways it is", citing the game had not learned lessons from Diablo by having a short single-player campaign, few powers and abilities, and no character classes or skills.

Criticism of the game frequently made adverse comparisons to the isometric role-playing video game Diablo. Lead designer Ion Hardie acknowledged that this reception came from the dissonance between the action gameplay and the isometric graphics of role-playing video games normally reserved for Diablo.

=== Legacy ===
Lead designer Ion Hardie states that developer Reflexive Entertainment was approached by Interplay subsidiary Black Isle Studios to develop a game after "because of the fun they had" playing Zax: The Alien Hunter. The following Reflexive Entertainment game, Lionheart: Legacy of the Crusader, was published by Black Isle Studios in 2003.
