= Crimsonland =

2003 shooter video game

- Developer: 10tons Entertainment
- Publisher: Reflexive Entertainment
- Platforms: Microsoft Windows; OS X Linux; Windows Phone; Android; PlayStation Vita; PlayStation TV; PlayStation 3 PlayStation 4 PlayStation 5 Xbox One; Nintendo Switch
- Release: 22 April 2003
- Genre: Shoot 'em up
- Modes: Single-player, multiplayer

Crimsonland is a top-down arena shooter video game with role-playing elements. It was developed by Finnish studio 10tons Entertainment and published by Reflexive Entertainment in 2003. In 2014 a re-release through digital distribution followed.

== Gameplay ==
The player is placed in the middle of the map while enemies gradually enter and make their way towards the player. The player has to eliminate the enemies before their health reaches zero. With each death of an enemy the player will gain experience points. Each level the player gains, the player can select special perks that range anywhere from faster reload times, faster shooting speed, faster movement, to status effects like radiation (creating an area of affect around the player that damages all enemies within its range), poison bullets, and many others. Randomly, when an enemy is killed they will drop a power-up that may be extra points, temporary invulnerability, fire bullets, slowing of time, and many others.

The game also offers local multiplayer for two players on the original and up to four on the re-release. In a multiplayer game, all players share the same experience and perks but are free to pick up any weapons or power-ups that may appear.

== Development ==
Originally developed by 10tons Entertainment and released as freeware/demo version, in 2003 a commercial shareware version with publisher Reflexive Entertainment followed. The game was re-released and self-published through digital distribution in 2014 with updates to graphics, perks, weapons, enemies, and game modes. In 2015 it was released for the Xbox One and later for Nintendo Switch in 2017.

== Reception ==
The general reception has been fairly positive. On Steam, the user reviews have Crimsonland rated as "Very Positive" and a 4.5 out of 5 from TouchArcade. IGN gave Crimsonland a 7.5 out of 10. Meanwhile, Metacritic has Crimsonland at 68 for PC and 64 on the PlayStation 4 and PlayStation Vita.
