= 12-pounder Whitworth rifle =

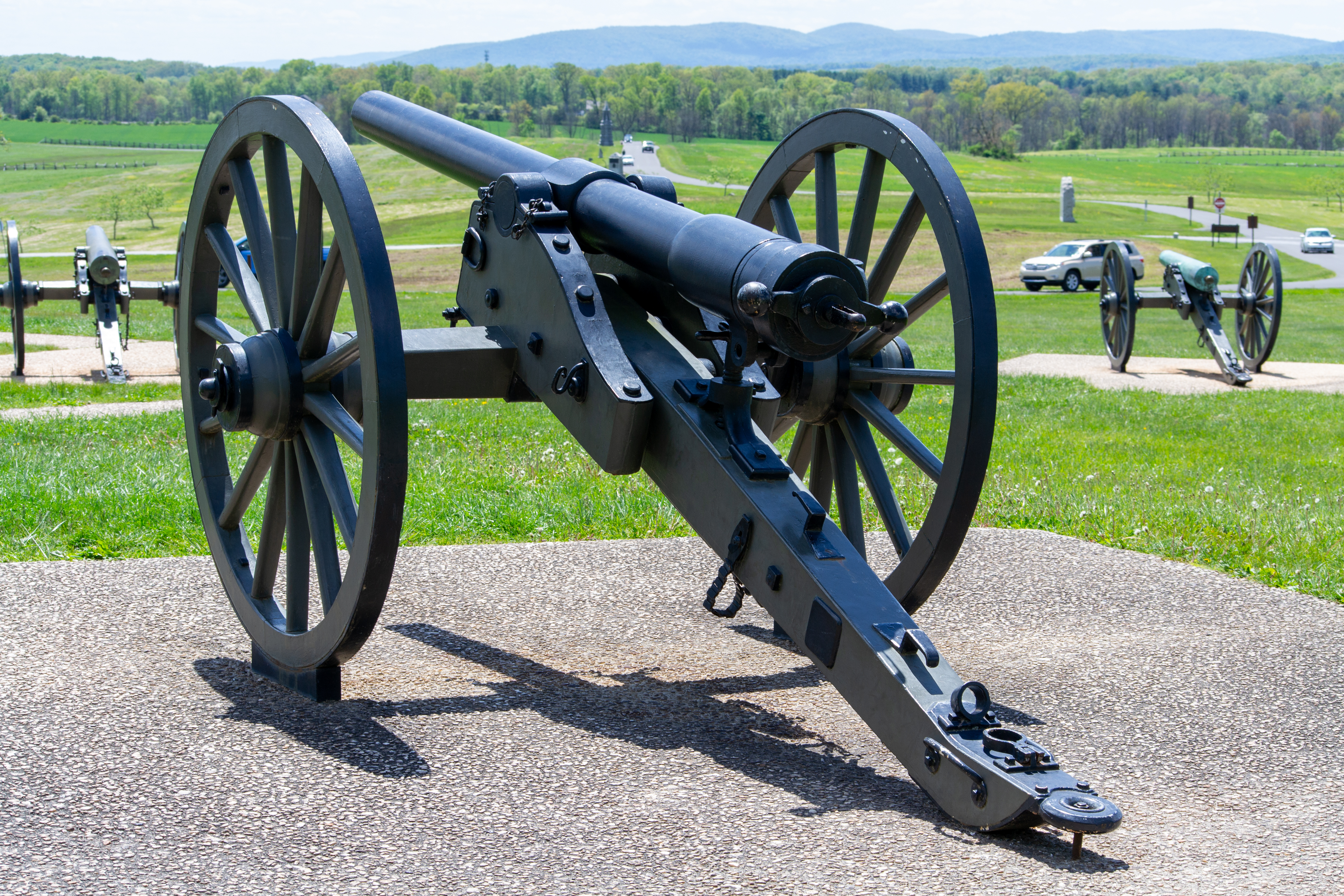
- Type: Field gun
- Place of origin: United Kingdom

Service history
- Used by: Confederate States; United States; Empire of Brazil
- Wars: American Civil War, War Of The Triple Alliance

Production history
- Designer: Joseph Whitworth
- Manufacturer: Joseph Whitworth

Specifications
- Mass: 896 lbs
- Barrel length: 7ft 9in

The 12-pounder Whitworth rifle was a medium caliber field gun deployed during the mid-19th century. Designed by Joseph Whitworth, the gun was most notably used during the American Civil War. The gun was also used by the Imperial Brazilian Army in the War of the Triple Alliance.

== Description ==
The 12-pdr rifle was designed in the early 1850s by British manufacturer Joseph Whitworth, who had recently been contracted to improve the Pattern 1853 Enfield. During his experiments with the Enfield, Whitworth was inspired to begin experimenting with a hexagonally-rifled barrel; Whitworth would later apply these principles to his field guns.

Along with Whitworth's smaller 3-pdr gun, the artillery piece was considered for adoption by the British government's Board of Ordnance. However, Whitworth's guns eventually lost out to the Armstrong gun. During the American Civil War the weapon was exported and saw service in the Union and Confederate armies, though it was considered a rarity.

From a design standpoint, the weapon was unique. Like all of Whitworth's designs, the weapon had a distinctive hexagonally-rifled barrel and was a breechloader (though it could be loaded via the muzzle with modifications). The cannon was forged using a method in which iron plates would be overlapped and forced together using hydraulic presses.

The 12-pounder Whitworth saw service with the Army of Northern Virginia. One Whitworth was used in the Confederate defense of Charleston. Brig. Gen. John Gregg's brigade used a Whitworth at the Battle of Raymond on May 12, 1863. The weapon also saw some service in the Union army (notably with the Army of the Potomac in the Peninsula campaign), and in one instance a group of Americans living in England gifted a battery of four Whitworths to the United States government.

== See also ==
120-pounder Whitworth naval gun
