= Swarm (1998 video game) =

- Developer: Reflexive Entertainment
- Publisher: Reflexive Entertainment
- Platform: Windows
- Release: NA: March 19, 1998; WW: 2008 (updated version)
- Genre: Third-person shooter
- Mode: Single-player

Swarm is a 1998 shoot 'em up developed and published for Microsoft Windows by Reflexive Entertainment. The action is viewed from a top-down perspective in outer space and uses pre-rendered 3D graphics. The player controls an assault craft that battles against alien creatures in order to obtain special minerals called EZT nodules. The player is able to upgrade their ship with power-ups.

In 2008, Reflexive released an updated version of the game as Swarm Gold.

== Plot ==
Swarm is set in the Praulac Nebula, which is inhabited by a strange insectoid race called the Clagnor. Negotiations between humans and the Clagnor have failed, leading to an all-out war between the two races. The story follows Raul Mastesson, a prison convict given the task of fighting the Clagnor for a year. After this, if by any chance he survives, his name will be cleared unless he takes an offer for another year on the job for twice the pay.

== Gameplay ==
Each sector or level consists of a finite wrap-around space area, in which Clagnor enemies, asteroids, weapon power-ups, and EZT nodules (a fictional substance [Endron Zymithium Trisistaline] described as a fuel source) are placed randomly. The player enters and exits each level via a jumpgate that disappears after the level is started and reappears once it is completed.

There are three types of levels in Swarm: "get all the EZT", "kill them all", and bonus levels. The majority of these are "get all the EZT" levels, in which the player's primary mission is to collect all the EZT found in the level while fighting against the Clagnor and avoiding obstacles (e.g. asteroids and space junk). In the "kill them all" levels, which are mostly every 10 levels or so, there are no EZT crystals and the player's goal is to destroy all the Clagnor drones in the level. In the bonus levels, which are usually every 5 or 10 levels, there are neither Clagnor nor EZT in the area, and so the player can freely travel around and collect weapons, ammunition, and shield bonuses for a limited time. Because the level's goal is chosen at random, it means the player can potentially get 3 bonus levels in a row.

== Reception ==
Reception

Review scores
| Publication | Score |
|---|---|
| Computer Games Strategy Plus | 3.5/5 |
| Next Generation | 2/5 |

The game received mixed reviews. Next Generation said, "For gamers after some good old-fashioned, arcade-style action, Swarm delivers. Just don't go in expecting bleeding-edge graphics or an enthralling story because they're nowhere to be found here."

== See also ==
- Escape Velocity, a role-playing game set in space from Ambrosia Software
- Starscape, a 2D space combat game from Moonpod
