= 3-pounder Whitworth rifle =

- Type: field gun

Service history
- Used by: United States
- Wars: American Civil War

Production history
- Designer: Joseph Whitworth
- Manufacturer: Joseph Whitworth

Specifications
- Mass: 208 lbs
- Barrel length: 6 ft
- Breech: 1.5 inches
- Effective firing range: 9,500 yards (9,688 claimed)

The 3-pounder Whitworth rifle was a small caliber field gun deployed during the mid-19th century. Designed by Joseph Whitworth, the gun was most notably used during the American Civil War.

== Description ==
The 3-pdr rifle was designed by British manufacturer Joseph Whitworth in the early 1850s. Along with Whitworth's 12-pdr rifle, the artillery piece was considered for adoption by the British government's Board of Ordnance, eventually losing out to the Armstrong gun. During the American Civil War the weapon was imported and saw service in the Union army and possibly in the Confederate army. In service, the rifle was sometimes referred to as a mountain gun, though this might stem from a confusion over caliber sizes.

From a design standpoint, the weapon was unique. Like all of Whitworth's designs, the weapon had a hexagon-ally rifled barrel. It was also a breechloader, an unusual feature for the time. The piece had exceptional range and accuracy, being capable of firing a 3-pound shell over 9,500 yards. However, the small size of the shell limited its bursting charge, consequently reducing the number of fragments formed when the shell detonated. According to a 1860 New York Times article covering Whitworth's weapons, the relatively small 3-pdr had superior range compared to his larger rifled guns.
