= Ricochet Lost Worlds: Recharged =

2004 video game

Ricochet Lost Worlds:Recharged
- Developer: Reflexive Entertainment
- Publisher: Reflexive Entertainment
- Composer: Zach Young
- Platform: Microsoft Windows
- Release: October 2004
- Genre: Breakout game
- Mode: Single player

Ricochet Lost Worlds: Recharged is the third game in the Ricochet video game series by Reflexive Entertainment. The difference between the earlier Ricochet Lost Worlds and Ricochet Lost Worlds: Recharged is the idea of user-made levels that are downloadable online. Many Reflexive Entertainment Games have since had the option to download more user-made levels after the regular levels are beaten.

Around 7 December 2017, the official website that hosted all user-made levels and the forums for both the Ricochet and the Big Kahuna series were permanently shut down because they were no longer sustainable to run.
