= Ricochet firing =

Intentional firing of a cannonball to make it skip across the ground

Ricochet firing is the firing of artillery at a low angle and non-maximal power so as to cause the shells to skip across the ground.

== Background ==
In traditional artillery tactics, either a cannon, a howitzer or occasionally a mortar would fire a shot that would just clear the outer parapet of a fortification, and then would bounce or ricochet inside the fortification's bounds. One of the primary purposes of ricochet fire was to dismount artillery and guns positioned on an enemy's fortifications. Additionally, ricochet fire could also be used to cause chaos behind an enemy army's fortifications, as the ricocheting cannonball would devastate logistical structures not fortified to withstand cannon fire.

The first European use of ricochet fire (tir à ricochet) has been accredited to the Marquis de Vauban during the siege of Philippsburg in 1688. He perfected it at the siege of Ath in 1697.
