= Ricochet Lost Worlds =

2004 video game

- Developer: Reflexive Entertainment
- Publisher: Reflexive Entertainment
- Composer: Zach Young
- Platforms: Microsoft Windows, Mac OS X, Xbox
- Release: Microsoft Windows; April, 2004; Mac OS X November, 2005; Xbox; November 6, 2004
- Genre: Breakout clone
- Mode: Single player

Ricochet Lost Worlds was developed by Reflexive Entertainment and is the sequel to Ricochet Xtreme. It features several new bricks, power-ups and background art. It also has the new "ring" feature, where you try to collect all the rings on each level. If you collect all five rings on every level, you become "Ring Master" and get the trophy at the end of the game. It is possible to beat the game without getting every ring, but it is less challenging.

Around 7 December 2017, the official website that hosted all user-made levels and the forums for both the Ricochet and the Big Kahuna series were permanently shut down because they were no longer sustainable to run.
