= Brooke rifle =

American Civil War coast defense gun

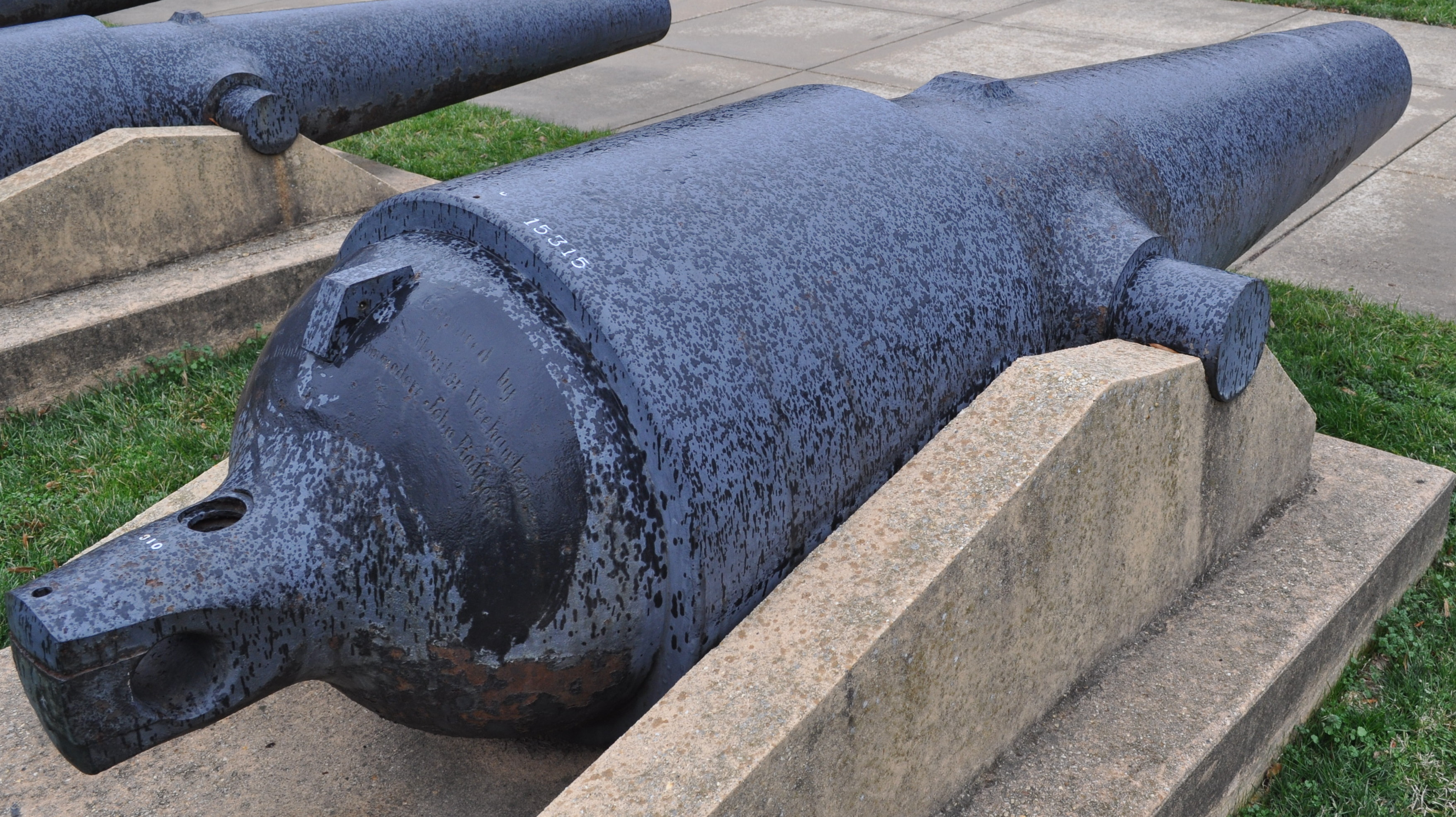
A 7-inch (178 mm) single-banded Brooke rifle captured aboard CSS Atlanta

The Brooke rifle was a type of rifled, muzzle-loading naval and coast defense gun designed by John Mercer Brooke, who was an officer in the Confederate States Navy. They were produced by plants in Richmond, Virginia, and Selma, Alabama, between 1861 and 1865 during the American Civil War. They served afloat on Confederate ships and ashore in coast defense batteries operated by the Confederate States Army.

== Design and production ==
Brookes can be identified by the presence of at least one band of wrought iron at the breech and a rough-finished, tapering barrel. The barrels were made of cast iron for ease of manufacture, but one or more wrought iron bands was welded around the chamber to reinforce it against the high chamber pressure exerted when the gun fired. Because no southern foundries had the capacity to wrap the rifles in a single band like the Parrott design, a series of smaller bands were used, each usually 2 inches (51 mm) thick and 6 inches (152 mm) wide. All of Brooke's rifles used the same seven-groove rifling with a right-hand twist. Most of Brooke's guns had a Gomer-style powder chamber, shaped like a truncated cone with a hemispherical tip, but the 6.4-inch rifles had a simple hemispherical powder chamber.

These weapons were manufactured at the Tredegar Iron Works (sometimes referred to as J.R. Anderson & Co, after owner Joseph Reid Anderson) in Richmond, Virginia, and at Selma Naval Ordnance Works in Selma, Alabama.

== Markings ==
Guns manufactured at Selma bear the foundry imprint "S", those from Tredegar "TF". "R.N.O.W" may be found on some guns as they were bored and rifled by the Richmond Naval Ordnance Works in Richmond, Virginia after a fire in May 1863 temporarily crippled Tredegar's boring shop.

== Types ==
=== 6.4-inch Rifle ===
Brooke reported fourteen single-banded 6.4 in (163 mm) rifles were completed by 8 January 1863, although Tredegar records list only eleven as some were double-banded before being shipped. Three were cast in 1861 with the remainder in 1862. Two of the earliest were mounted on the broadside of the ironclad CSS Virginia. Two were mounted fore and aft on pivot carriages aboard the ironclad gunboat CSS Neuse. Two others were mounted on the broadside of the ironclad CSS Atlanta and survive today in Willard Park of the Washington Navy Yard.

Double-banded rifles were produced from 28 October 1862 by direction of Stephen Mallory, Confederate Secretary of the Navy. Twenty-four were cast by Tredegar between 1862 and 1864 while Selma cast twenty-seven, but only fifteen were shipped due to casting problems. Five of the damaged gun blocks were rebored as 8-inch (203 mm) double-banded smoothbores. Nine survivors exist, including four from CSS Tennessee II and one from CSS Albemarle.

=== 7-inch Rifle ===
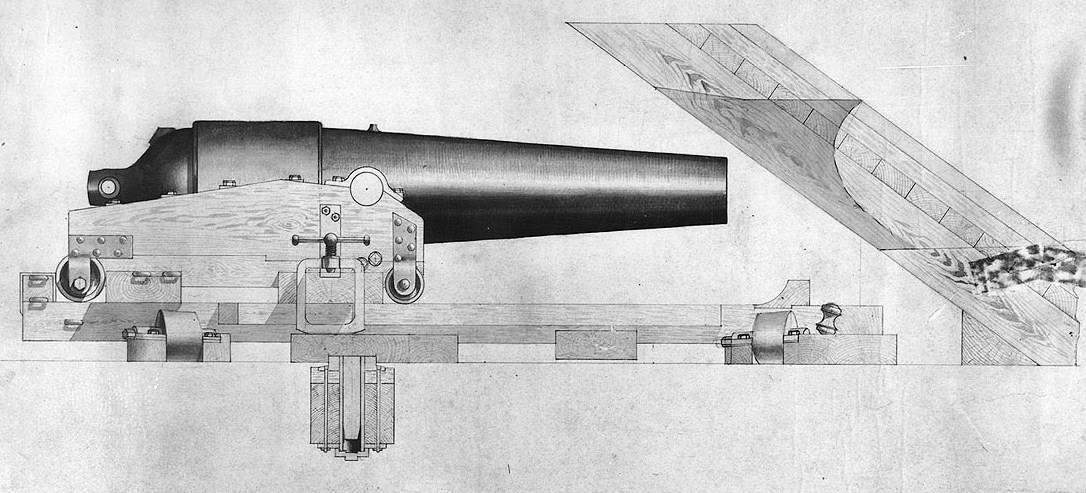
Drawing of a single-banded Brooke for the CSS Texas

The first seven single-banded 7-inch (178 mm) were bored and rifled from 9-inch (229 mm) Dahlgren gun blocks between July and December 1861. Two of these were the front and rear pivot guns of the CSS Virginia. Tredegar made another nineteen to the Brooke pattern between 1862 and 1863 of which three survive. Two of these are found at the Washington Navy Yard as trophies from CSS Atlanta.

Selma cast fifty-four double-banded rifles in 1863 and 1864, but only shipped thirty-nine due to casting flaws. Tredegar cast thirty-six between 1863 and 1865. Eight survive, two from CSS Tennessee II, one in the Washington Navy Yard and the other in Selma. Another, number S89, may be found at Fort Morgan State Historic Park. On September 29, 2015, an archeological team from the University of South Carolina recovered a 7-inch double-banded gun from the CSS Pedee. S96, which was mounted at Fort Sidney Johnston on the Tombigbee River, is currently displayed in front of the city hall of Jackson, Alabama. An additional rifle, S95, sits on private property near the site of Fort Stonewall.

Three triple-banded rifles were cast by Tredegar in 1862. These were 15 inches (380 mm) longer than the other 7-inch rifles and were unique among Brooke guns in that they lacked cast trunnions. Instead a separate trunnion strap was fitted around the breech. One was mounted on the CSS Richmond and another was sent to the harbor defenses of Charleston, South Carolina, where it remains as a trophy in Ft. Moultrie.

=== 8-inch Rifle ===
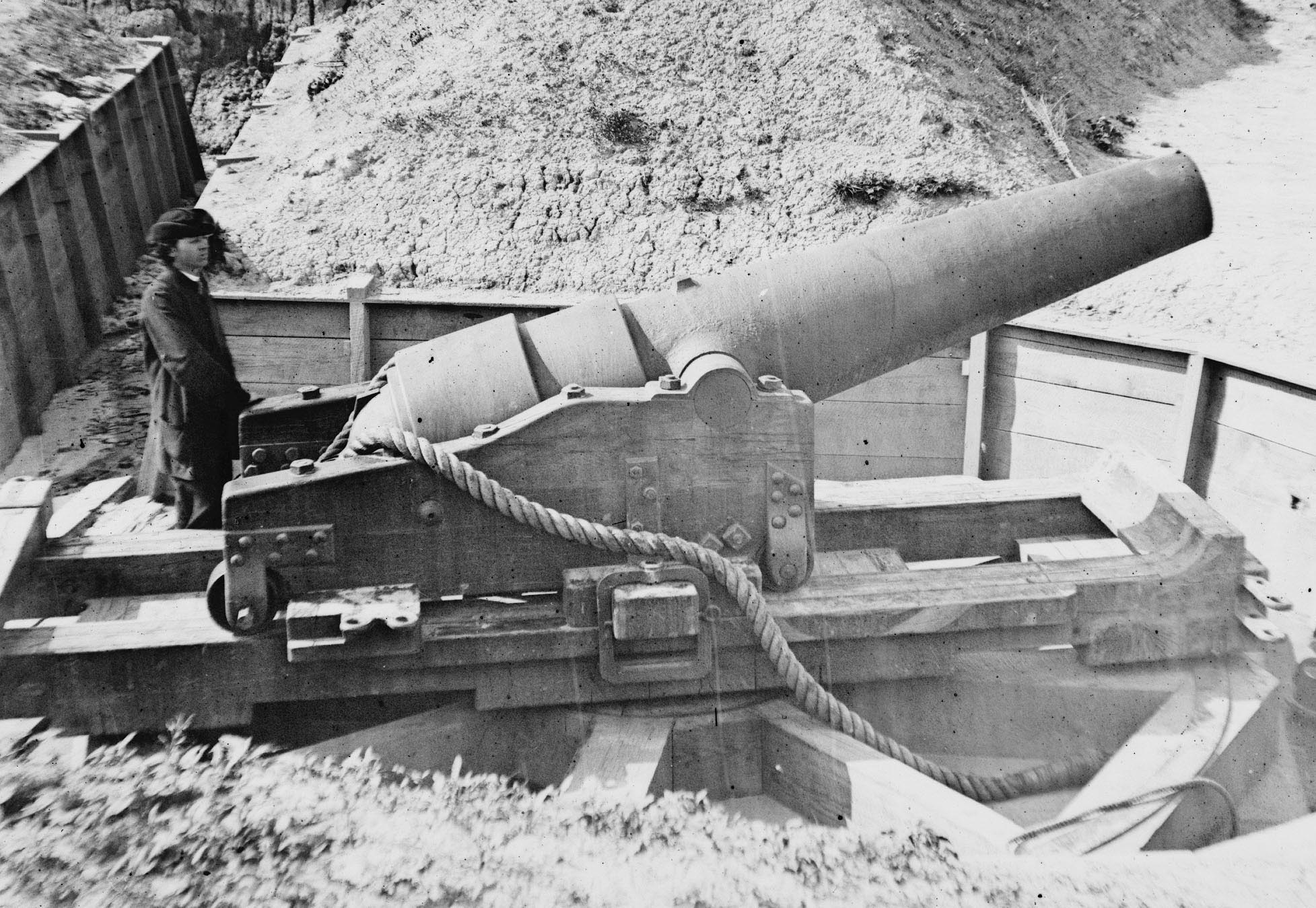
A 8-inch (203 mm) double-banded Brooke rifle

Tredegar cast four double-banded 8 in (203 mm) rifles in April and May 1864. One was mounted in CSS Virginia II while another was sent to the batteries defending the James River. It was present, but lacked shells during the fighting at Dutch Gap Canal on 13 August and 22 October 1864. Shells were delivered on 27 October and 2 November 1864. No known survivors.

=== Brooke smoothbores ===
Brooke designed a series of smoothbores that were produced in small numbers by the Selma and Tredegar foundries. Selma re-bored five flawed 6.4-inch blanks as 8-inch double-banded guns, one of which (S26) survives mounted in a cemetery in Gainesville, Alabama. Brooke's 1863 report to Secretary Mallory shows a plate of an unbanded 8-inch smoothbore, but nothing further is known of it. Similar attempts to bore out flawed 7-inch gun blocks to 9-inch (229 mm) smoothbores were unsuccessful. Seven 10-inch (254 mm) double-banded guns were cast by Selma and four by Tredegar in 1864. Two survive, one of which is a trophy from CSS Columbia in the Washington Navy Yard. Selma cast twelve 11-inch double-banded smoothbores in 1864, although only eight were shipped. One survives in Columbus, Georgia. In 1863 and 1864 two 11-inch triple-banded guns were cast by Tredegar, but none are known to survive.

=== Ammunition ===
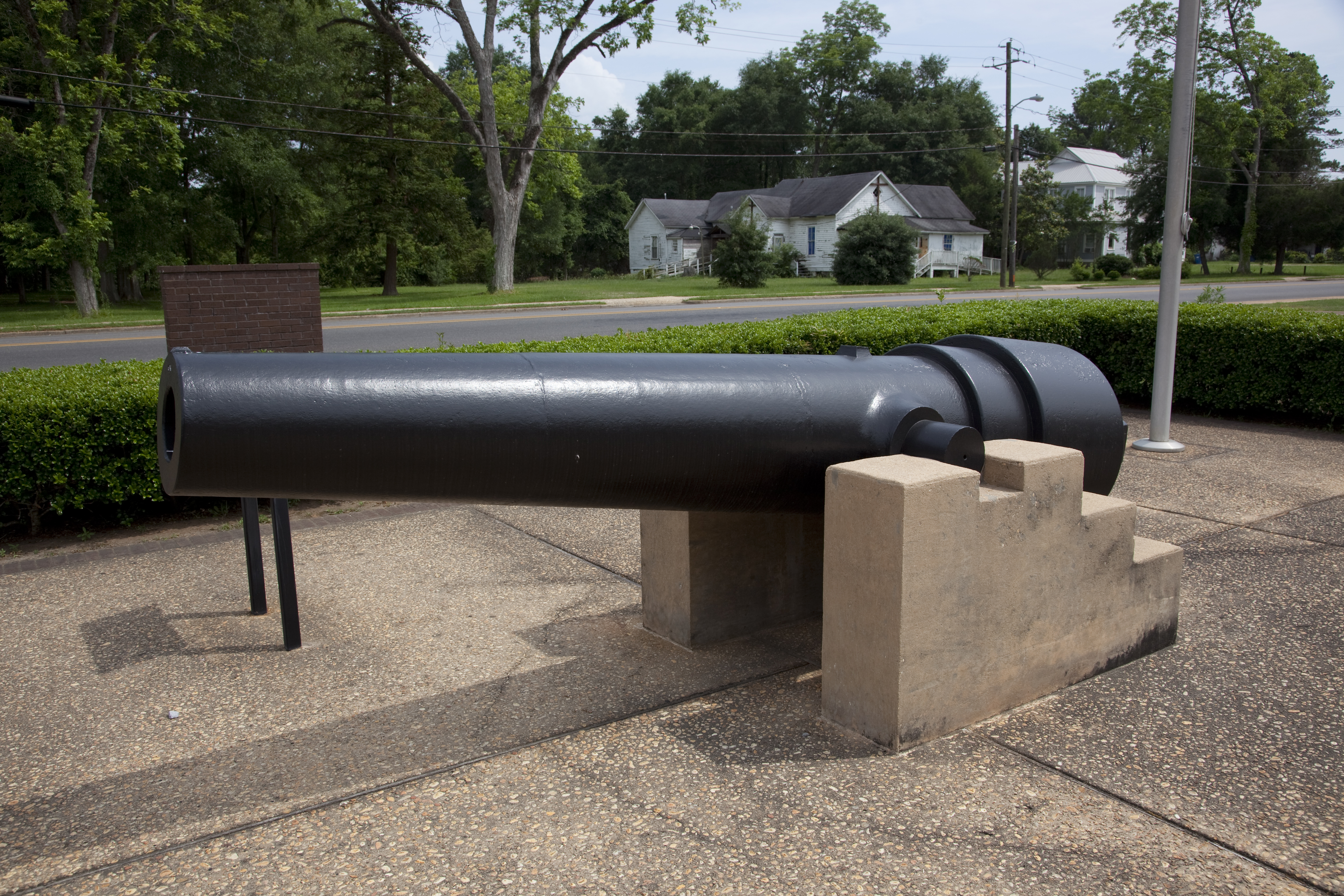
Brooke rifle S96 from Fort Sidney Johnston on display in Jackson, Alabama.

Brooke's rifles fired both armor-piercing and explosive shells of his own design. The former were solid cylindrical projectiles with a blunt or flat nose to reduce the chance of a ricochet, and were often referred in contemporary accounts as "bolts". The latter were hollow cylinders with rounded or pointed noses. They were filled with black powder with a fuse set to detonate a variable amount of time after being fired. His smoothbores used spherical solid shot for armored targets and hollow spherical explosive shells against unarmored targets.

== Specifications ==
Gun type	Weight (approximate)	Overall length	Caliber
6.4-inch single-banded rifle	9,100 lb (4,100 kg)	141.85 in (360.3 cm)	18.5
6.4-inch double-banded rifle	10,600 lb (4,800 kg)	141.85 in (360.3 cm)	18.5
7-inch single-banded rifle	15,000 lb (6,800 kg)	146.05 in (371.0 cm)	17.1
7-inch double-banded rifle	15,000 lb (6,800 kg)	146.15 in (371.2 cm)	17.3
7-inch triple-banded rifle	20,827 lb (9,447 kg)	151.2 in (384 cm)	19.4
8-inch double-banded rifle	21,750 lb (9,870 kg)	158.5 in (403 cm)	16.2
8-inch double-banded smoothbore*	10,370 lb (4,700 kg)	141.85 in (360.3 cm)	14.8
10-inch smoothbore	21,300 lb (9,700 kg)	158.25 in (402.0 cm)	13
11-inch smoothbore	23,600 lb (10,700 kg)	170.75 in (433.7 cm)	13

- Note: Data for 8-inch smoothbore is approximate

== See also ==
- Siege artillery in the American Civil War

Contemporary rifled artillery

- James rifle
- Parrott rifle
- Sawyer rifle
- Wiard rifle
