= Cooper bombs =

British 20 pound bomb used in World War I

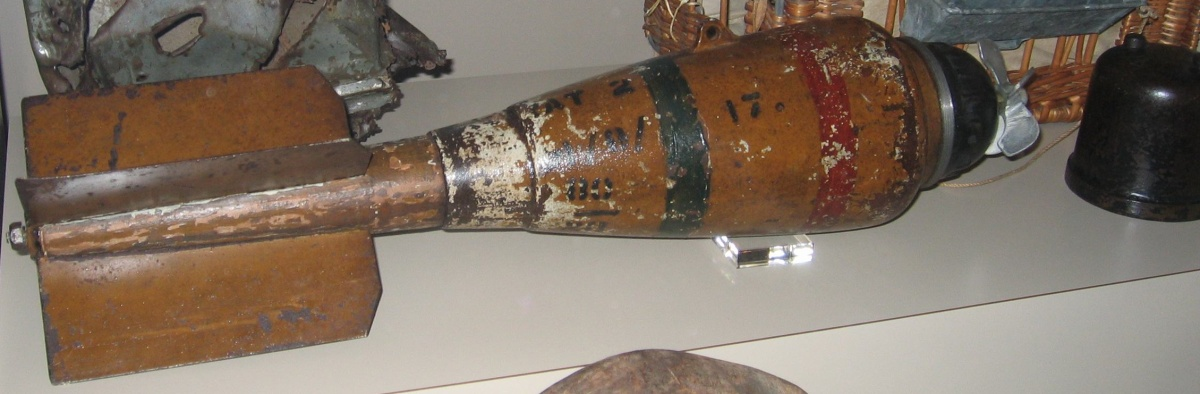
20 lb (9 kg) Cooper bomb.

The Cooper bomb was a British 20-pound (9 kg) bomb used extensively in World War I. It was the first high explosive bomb to be adapted by the Royal Flying Corps.

== Design ==
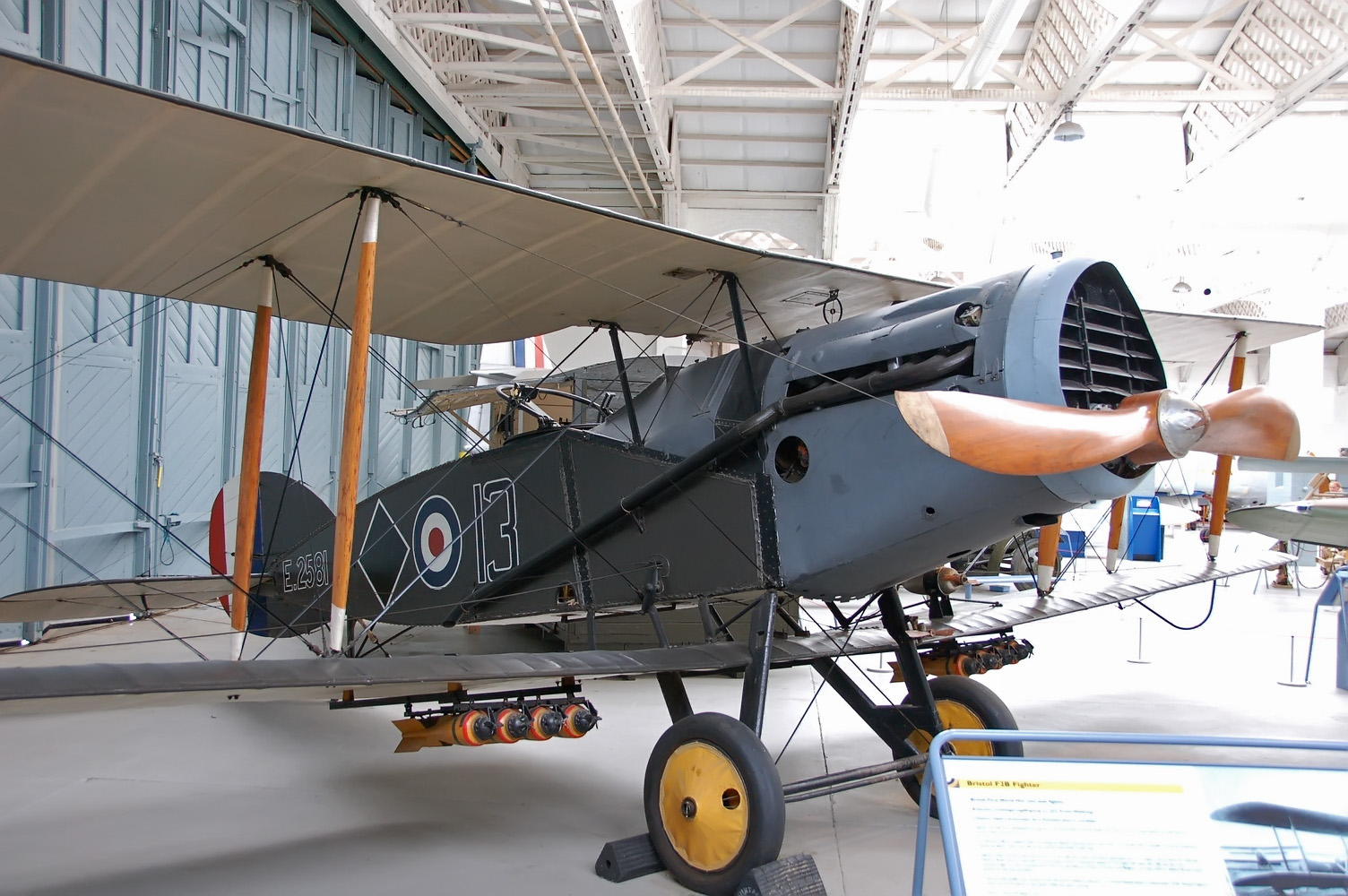
Bristol F.2 Fighter with 8 Cooper bombs under the wings.

The bomb was 24 lb (11 kg) in weight, of which 20 lb (9 kg) was the bomb casing and 4 lb (1.8 kg) was an explosive charge of Amatol. The main body was 5/16 inch (8 mm) thick, and was made of cast iron, steel, or semisteel. The aft body was made of wood and the fins from sheet steel.

== List of aircraft that used the Cooper bomb ==
- Royal Aircraft Factory S.E.5
- Bristol F.2 Fighter
- Airco DH.4
- Sopwith Camel
- Royal Aircraft Factory F.E.2
