= Dahlgren gun =

American naval gun of the 19th Century

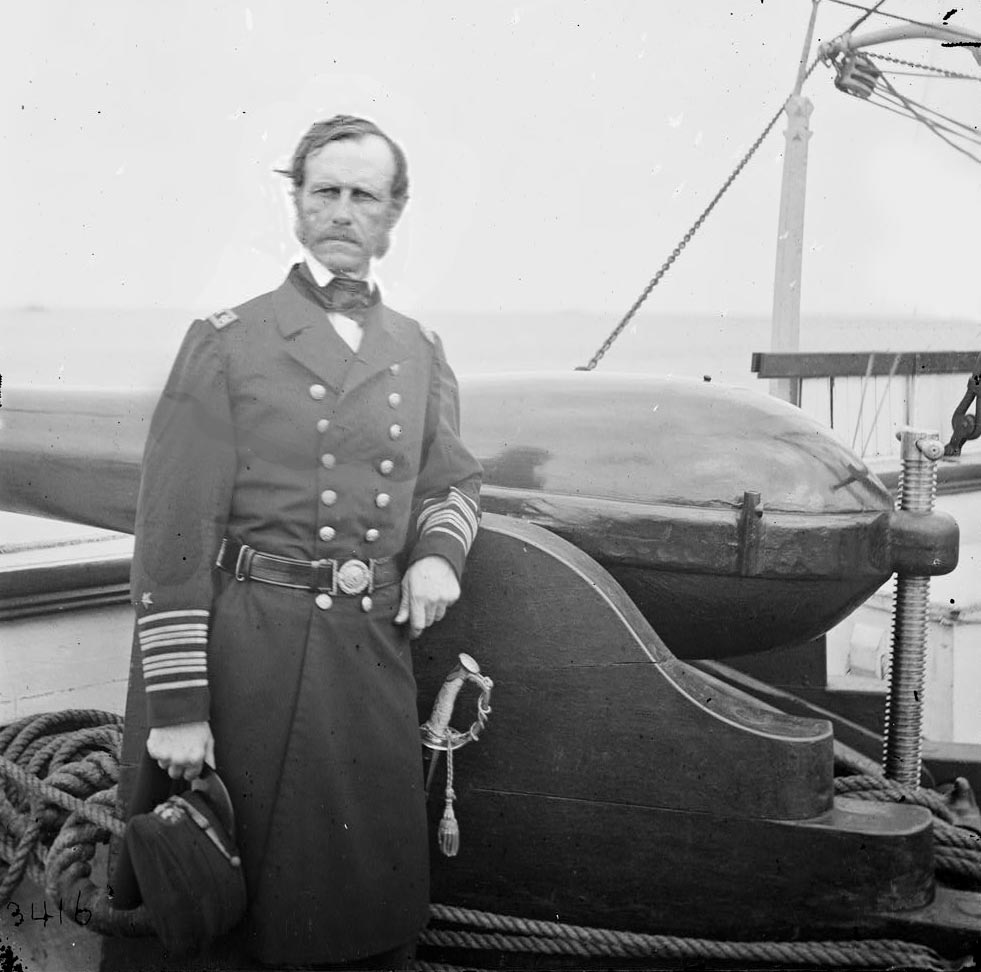
John A. Dahlgren standing next to a 50 lb (22.7 kg) Dahlgren rifle aboard USS Pawnee in 1865

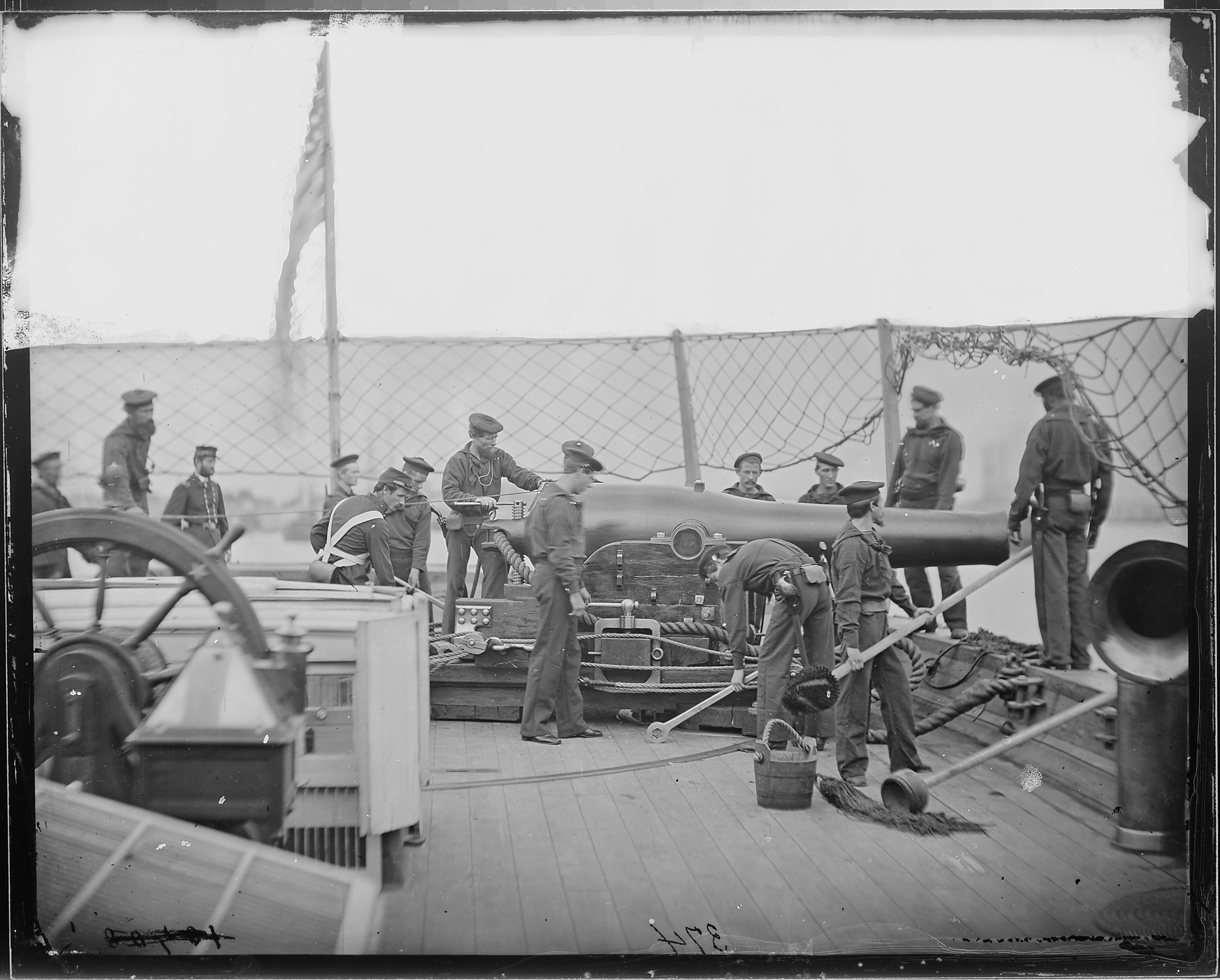
A 9 in (229 mm) Dahlgren smoothbore naval gun and crew in the stern pivot position of USS Miami, 1864. (National Archives).

Dahlgren guns were muzzle-loading naval guns designed by United States Navy Rear Admiral John A. Dahlgren (November 13, 1809 – July 12, 1870), mostly used in the American Civil War. Dahlgren's design philosophy evolved from an accidental explosion in 1849 of a 32 lb (14.5 kg) gun being tested for accuracy, killing a gunner. He believed a safer, more powerful naval cannon could be designed using more scientific design criteria. Dahlgren guns were designed with a smooth curved shape, equalizing strain and concentrating more weight of metal in the gun breech where the greatest pressure of expanding propellant gases needed to be met to keep the gun from bursting.

== Dahlgren boat howitzers ==
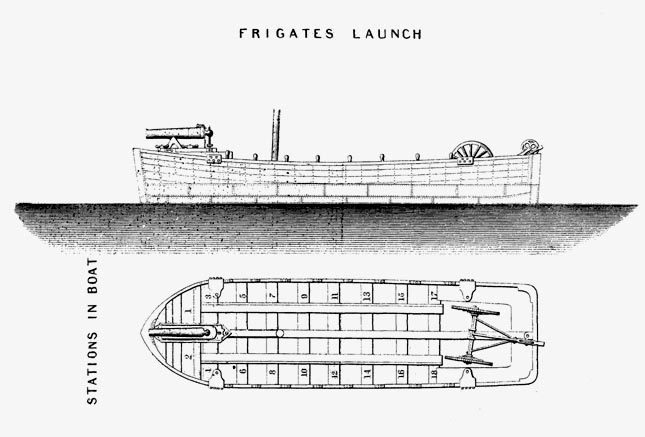
Dahlgren boat howitzer mounted in frigate's launch. The field carriage can be seen in stern

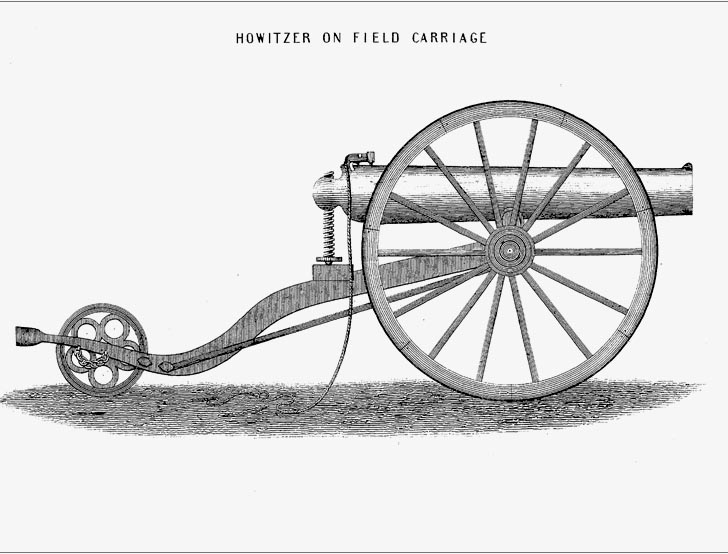
Dahlgren boat howitzer mounted on field carriage

During the Mexican–American War, the U.S. found itself lacking in light guns that could be fired from ships' boats and landed to be used as light artillery in support of landing parties. Light artillery borrowed from the army proved unsatisfactory. In 1849, then-lieutenant Dahlgren began to design a family of smoothbore muzzle-loading boat howitzers that could be mounted in ships' launches and cutters as well as onto field carriages. The first boat howitzers to be designed were a light 12 lb (5.4 kg) "12-pounder", a heavy 12-pounder (originally designated a "medium"), and a 24 lb (10.9 kg) "24-pounder". Later a lighter 12-pounder (the "small") and a rifled 12-pounder heavy howitzer were introduced. All of the boat howitzers were very similar in design, cast in bronze, with a mounting lug or loop on the bottom of the barrel instead of trunnions, and an elevating screw running through the cascabel. Having the single mounting lug expedited moving the howitzer from the launch to field carriage and back. In naval service the boat howitzers had gun crews of 10 in the boat and 11 ashore.

The field carriage was made of wrought iron. No limber was used in naval service, but two ammunition boxes (each containing nine rounds) could be lashed to the axle of the field carriage. Members of the gun crew also carried a single round in an ammunition pouch. The smoothbore boat howitzers fired shell, shrapnel, and canister. The rifled 12-pounder fired shot and shell. Percussion primers were used in naval service, but the howitzers could also use friction primers obtained from the army.

The small and the light 12-pounder boat howitzers were not popular. The heavy 12-pounder howitzers were most popular at their intended jobs, while the 24-pounder boat howitzer were found to serve excellently as primary and secondary armaments on river gunboats and similar small vessels. Some 24-pounder boat howitzers were apparently rifled, but some contemporary accounts confuse rifled 24-pounder boat howitzers and the 20-pounder rifles (discussed below)

=== Army use of boat howitzers ===
Aside from use in naval service, boat howitzers saw service with the land forces as well. The boat howitzers were occasionally used in artillery batteries, but were more often used in infantry units, in a role that would later be called infantry support guns.

At First Bull Run, Company I of the 71st New York Infantry Regiment brought two boat howitzers with them. The unit had trained on boat howitzers while deployed at Washington D.C., and when called to Bull Run, brought two of them along. When the regiment retreated they left the howitzers behind for the Confederate forces to capture.

During the Antietam Campaign, Whiting's Battery (Company K, 9th NY Infantry [Hawkins' Zouaves]), employed five Dahlgren boat howitzers (two rifled, two smoothbore, and one of indeterminate type). The howitzers fired on Confederate skirmishers at Snavely's Ford and suppressed them (Johnson & Anderson, p. 78). The Confederate Grimes' (Portsmouth) Battery had two smoothbore Dahlgren boat howitzers, with which they fought near Piper's Stone Barn (Johnson & Anderson, p. 78). The boat howitzers appeared to be popular—when Grimes' battery was forced to turn in one of its guns, it chose to turn in a three-inch ordnance rifle rather than one of its boat howitzers (Johnson & Anderson, p. 24).

The 1st New York Marine Artillery Regiment ("Howard's Artillery, Naval Brigade") also armed themselves with boat howitzers, using them for their designed use of amphibious expeditions. The unit participated in 16 raids along the North Carolina coast employing their boat howitzers. The New York Marine Artillery was issued twelve 12-pounder rifled boat howitzers made by Norman Wiard out of semi-steel, a low-carbon iron alloy. Other than the material used, the Wiard boat howitzers were identical to the Dahlgren 12-pounder rifled boat howitzers. The Wiard howitzers were not made in large numbers (Ripley 1984, p. 168).

Boat howitzers were used in the western theaters also. The Indiana Brigade used a Dahlgren boat howitzer in fighting near Grand Prairie, Arkansas, on July 5, 1862. (War Department 1885, p. 109).

While boat howitzers were never commonly used by either army, by the end of the war their use by land forces was very rare.

=== Table of Dahlgren boat howitzers ===
Designation	Bore	Length Overall	Weight	Service Charge	Range (yards)	Number Made
12-pdr small (5.4 kg)	4.62 inches (11.7 cm)	32.5 inches (83 cm)	300 pounds (140 kg)	—	—	23
12-pdr light	4.62 inches (11.7 cm)	51.75 inches (131.4 cm)	430 pounds (200 kg)	10 ounces (280 g)	—	177
12-pdr heavy	4.62 inches (11.7 cm)	63.5 inches (161 cm)	750 pounds (340 kg)	1 pound (0.45 kg)	1,085 yards (992 m) at 5° elev.	456
12-pdr rifled	3.4 inches (8.6 cm)	63.5 inches (161 cm)	880 pounds (400 kg)	1 pound (0.45 kg)	1,770 yards (1,620 m) at 6° elev.	424
24-pdr (10.9 kg)	5.82 inches (14.8 cm)	67 inches (170 cm)	1,300 pounds (590 kg)	2 pounds (0.91 kg)	1,270 yards (1,160 m) at 11° elev.	1009

== Dahlgren shell guns ==
Throughout the 18th and early 19th centuries, the primary ship-to-ship weapons were muzzle-loading smoothbore broadside guns firing solid iron shot short distances. This all changed when the French Navy adopted a design of Col. Henri-Joseph Paixhans for a shell gun (canon-obusier) of 22 cm (8.7-inch) capable of throwing a 59 lb (26.8 kg) shell in a reasonably flat trajectory (Gardiner 1992, p. 154) in 1842. The U.S. Navy shortly followed suit, adopting an 8 in (203 mm), 63 cwt (2,858 kg) Paixhans-style shell gun. Dahlgren was determined to design a new generation of shell gun that would be capable of firing explosive shells at higher velocity and greater range. They would also have the capacity to effectively fire solid shot. The ability to fire solid shot would become increasingly important as armored warships appeared on the scene:

Paixhans had so far satisfied naval men of the power of shell guns as to obtain their admission on shipboard; but by unduly developing the explosive element, he had sacrificed accuracy and range.... The difference between the system of Paixhans and my own was simply that Paixhans guns were strictly shell guns, and were not designed for shot, nor for great penetration or accuracy at long ranges. They were, therefore, auxiliary to, or associates of, the shot-guns. This made a mixed armament, was objectionable as such, and never was adopted to any extent in France... My idea was, to have a gun that should generally throw shells far and accurately, with the capacity to fire solid shot when needed. Also to compose the whole battery entirely of such guns.

— Admiral John A. Dahlgren.

All of the Dahlgren shell guns were cast iron columbiads, with a distinctive soda bottle shape, and all but two had an elevating screw running through the cascabel. Although some Dahlgren shell guns were tested to failure, no Dahlgren shell gun burst during service, a notable distinction for the time. Dahlgren shell guns were capable of firing shot, shell, shrapnel, canister, and (with the exception of the XV-inch shell gun) grapeshot.

=== Specific shell and related guns ===
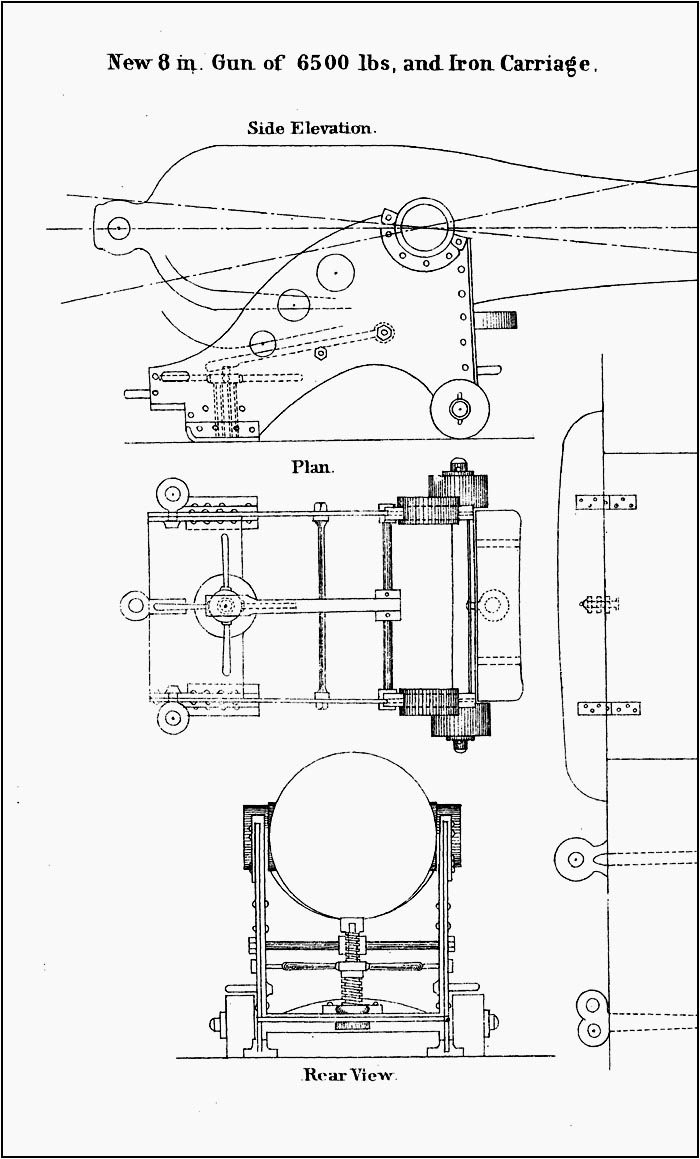
Line engraving of a VIII-inch Dahlgren shell gun on an iron carriage

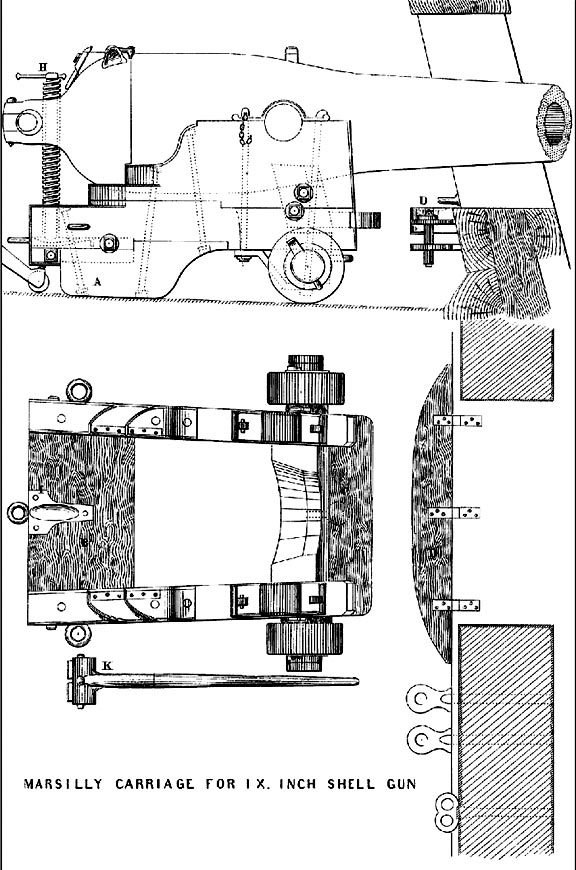
IX-inch Dahlgren mounted on a Marsilly carriage

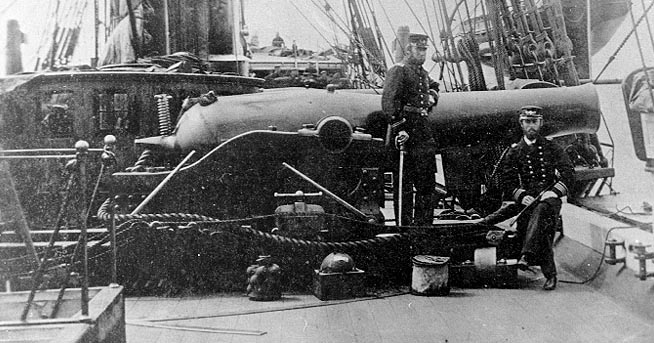
View on deck of USS Kearsarge showing aft XI-inch Dahlgren shell gun

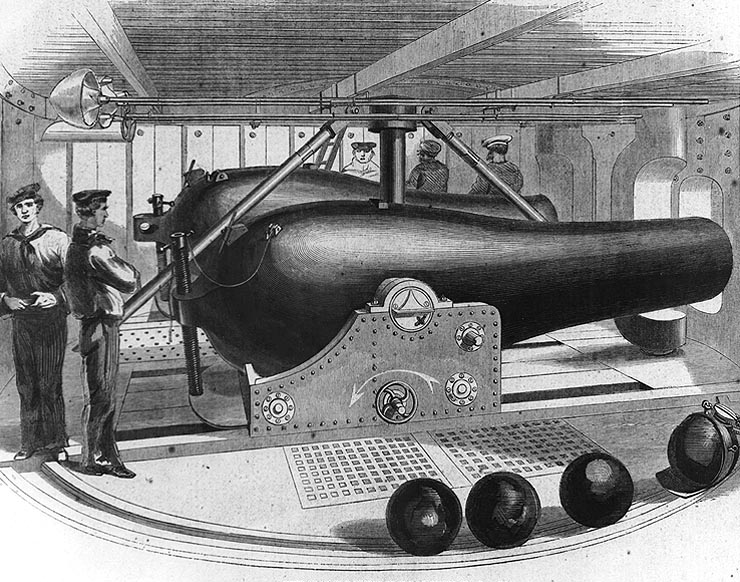
Interior of USS Passaic's gun turret

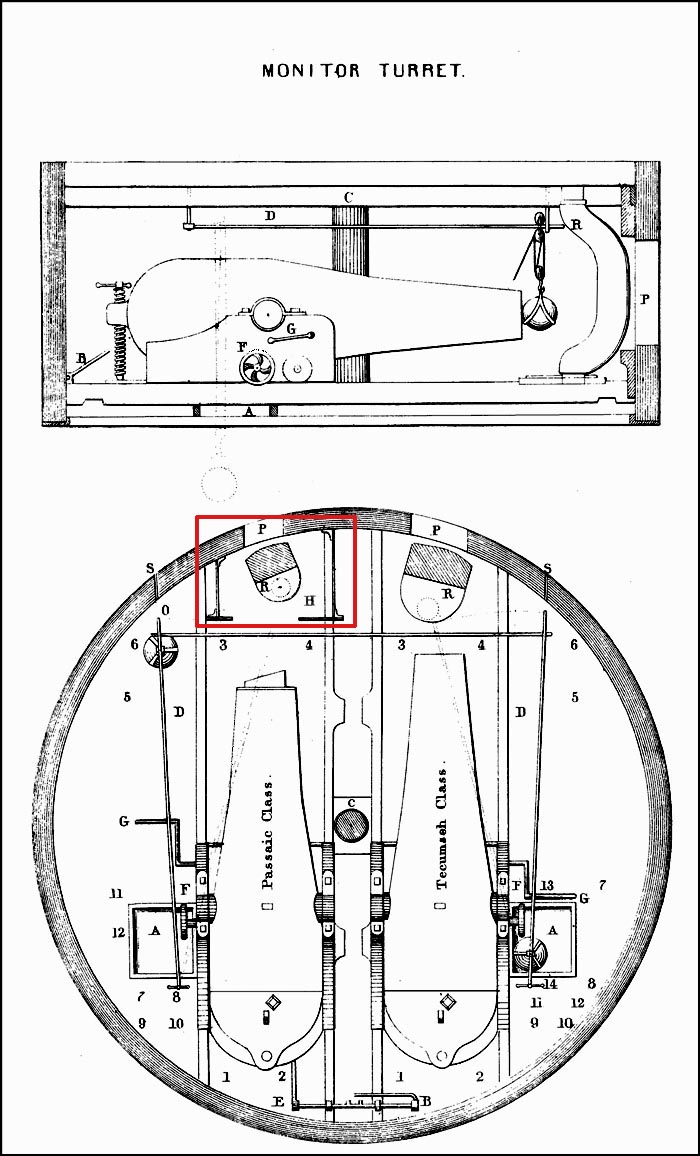
Engraving of hypothetical monitor turret showing both XV-inch short Passaic and XV-inch long Tecumseh mounted in same turret. The smoke-box of the XV-inch short Passaic is highlighted by the red box.

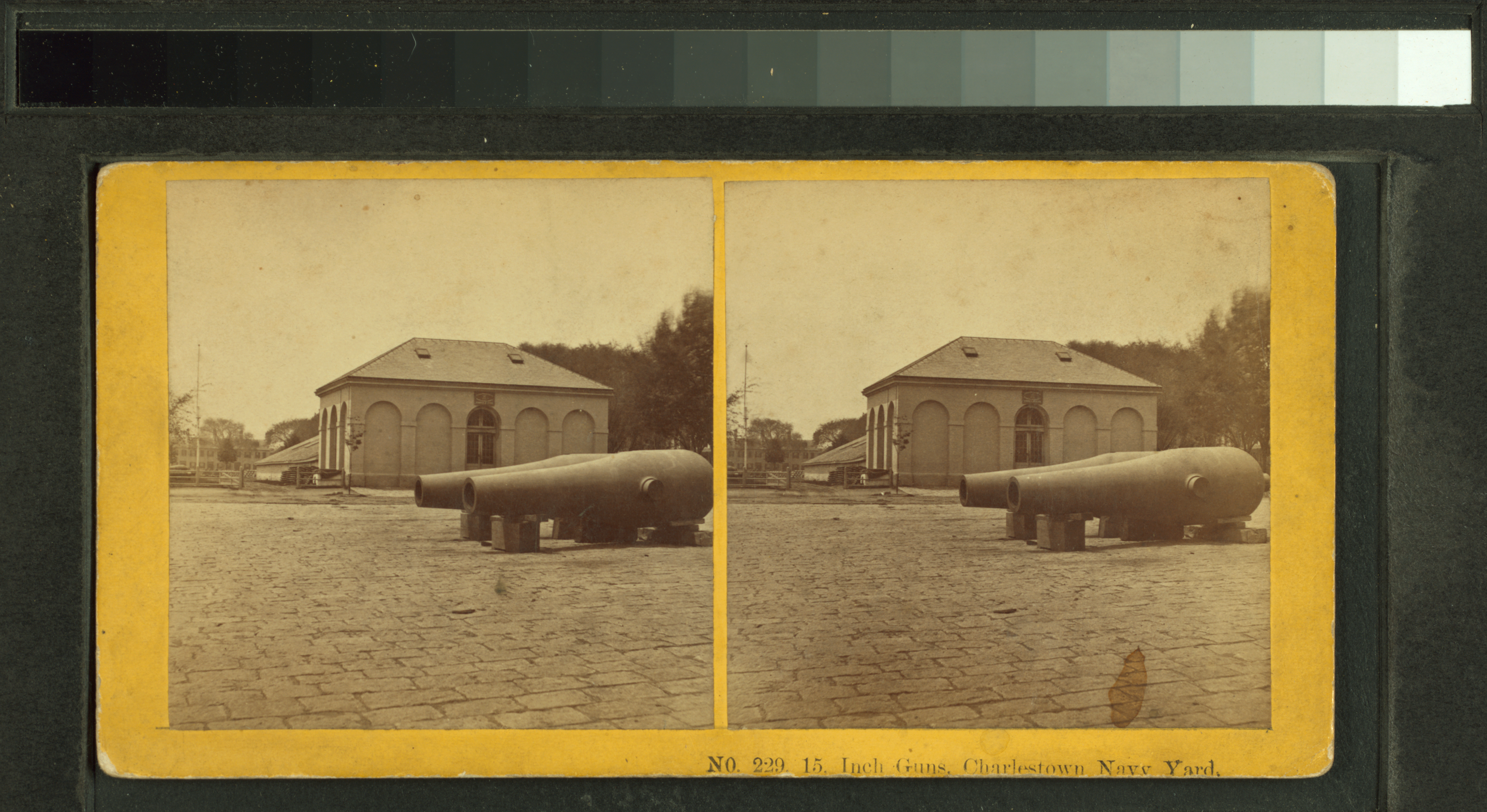
Stereoscopic view of XV-inch Dahlgren guns, Charlestown Navy Yard, Boston, Massachusetts

==== Thirty-two-pounder ====
Thirty-two-pounder gun of 27 cwt. M.1855: Little is known about the 32 lb (14.5 kg) 27 cwt (1,225 kg) gun as few were believed to have been produced. The U.S. Navy had several different models of 32-pounders, which are hard to differentiate in records. Thirty-two-pounders were the primary armaments of older ships like USS Cumberland (commissioned 1842, sunk by CSS Virginia) and USS Congress (commissioned 1842, struck its colors to CSS Virginia). Later ships were armed with mixtures of shell guns, most of which were designed by Dahlgren. The 32-pounders were still useful in providing primary or secondary armament to smaller ships and river gunboats. While earlier 32-pounders primarily fired solid shot, and these guns were called shot guns (Department of the Navy 1866, p. B/xvi) these newer guns could also fire shell. The 32-pounder gun of 27 cwt. had a crew of six and a powder-boy.

Thirty-two-pounder gun of 4,500 pounds and VIII-inch Dahlgren shell gun: 383 of the 32-pounders (Dahlgren 1872, p. App.A) each weighing 4,500 lb (2,041 kg) and 355 of the 8 in (203 mm) Dahlgrens were cast by Alger Builders, Fort Pitt Foundry, and Seyfert, McManus & Co. between 1864 and 1867. The 32-pounder had a crew of 10 and a powder-boy while the VIII-inch had a crew of 12 and a powder-boy. Some have argued that these guns are not Dahlgren designs, pointing out that while the guns generally resemble his designs, these guns used old-style breeching jaws instead of the breech loop found on other Dahlgrens and that there is no elevating screw running through the cascabel (Ten Brink 2000). It is also asserted that the guns would have to be elevated by quoins. This is not accurate, particularly for the VIII-inch Dahlgren, as a new iron carriage with an elevating screw beneath the breech of the gun was developed for VIII-inch (Department of the Navy 1866, p. III/66) and other carriages with breech elevating screws were also used (Department of the Navy 1866, p. I/83). It is also argued that the bores were too small for their late introduction and very few saw service during or after the American Civil War. These guns would most likely have been intended for small riverine and estuarine gunboats, which the navy scrapped as quickly as possible after the war. The documentary evidence also supports a conclusion that these two guns should be considered to be Dahlgren designs. In Mrs. Dahlgren's petition to the national government for compensation for the use of Admiral Dahlgren's inventions, both the 32-pounder gun of 4,500 pounds and VIII-inch shell gun are specifically described as designs of Admiral Dahlgren (Dahlgren 1872, p. App. A). Also, in February 1867, Cyrus Alger & Co. paid a royalty on the Dahlgren patent for production of "ten eight-inch guns weighing 64,270, $642.70." (Ripley 1984, p. 103) There can be little doubt that both of these guns should be credited as Dahlgren designs.

==== IX-inch ====
IX-inch Dahlgren shell gun: 1,185 guns were cast at Alger, Bellona, Fort Pitt, Seyfert, McManus & Co., Tredegar, and West Point foundries between 1855 and 1864. Fort Pitt Foundry also made 16 for the army in 1861. The IX-inch Dahlgren was the most popular and versatile of Dahlgren shell guns made. The IX-inch guns served as broadside armament on larger ships such as USS Susquehanna, which carried 12 IX-inch Dahlgren guns in broadside mounts in addition to her two pivot guns and USS Powhatan which carried 10 IX-inch guns in broadside mounts in addition to her two XI-inch Dahlgren pivot guns. These broadside guns would normally be mounted on a Marsilly carriage (see illustration). Smaller coastal blockade ships such as USS Fort Henry and USS Hunchback mounted IX-inch Dahlgrens on pivot mounts. IX-inch Dahlgrens were used on several river gunboats such as USS Essex and USS Benton. If mounted as either a pivot gun or a broadside gun the IX-inch Dahlgren had a crew of 16 and a powderman.

==== X-inch ====
X-inch Dahlgren shell gun (light): 10 were cast at Seyfert, McManus & Co. and West Point foundries between 1855 and 1864. Pivot mounted on board ships such as USS Cumberland, USS Brooklyn and USS Merrimack (pre-CSS Virginia) with a crew of 20 and a powderman.

X-inch Dahlgren shell gun (heavy): 34 cast between 1862 and 1865. Designed from the beginning to fire shot against armored ships with heavier powder charges. Mounted on a pivot mount with a crew of 20 and a powderman.

==== XI-inch ====
XI-inch Dahlgren shell gun: 465 were cast at Alger; Builders; Fort Pitt; Hinkley, Williams & Co.; Portland Locomotive Works; Seyfert, McManus & Co.; Trenton Iron Works; and West Point foundries between 1856 and 1864. This is the only Dahlgren gun to have been designed both with and without a muzzle swell. The gun was typically mounted on a pivot or in a turret on a monitor. When mounted in a turret, the crew for an XI-inch Dahlgren was seven including powdermen. The crew for the gun when mounted on a pivot was 24 men and a powderman. XI-inch Dahlgrens were carried on Neosho, Marietta, Casco, Milwaukee, and Passaic(1 XI-inch and 1 XV-inch short) class monitors as well as the original USS Monitor. USS Kearsarge, USS Powhatan, and many other conventional ships carried XI-inch Dahlgrens on pivot mounts. A few larger river gunboats, such as USS Tuscumbia and USS Indianola also carried XI-inch Dahlgrens.

==== XIII-inch ====
XIII-inch Dahlgren shell gun: The XIII-inch Dahlgren was originally intended for Passaic-class monitors but proved unsuccessful and the XV-inch Dahlgren was used instead.

==== XV-inch ====
XV-inch Dahlgren shell gun (short or Passaic): 34 were cast by the Fort Pitt Foundry between 1862 and 1864 (Ten Brink 2000). The first XV-inch guns' barrels were so short that the muzzle was inside the monitor's turret when the gun was discharged (although the Passaic class' turrets featured gunports drilled to fit the XI-inch Dahlgren in any case). The resulting blast and fumes in the turret would have made the gun impossible to work. The navy constructed smoke-boxes inside the turrets of the monitors equipped with the short XV-inch gun (see illustration), but the presence of the smoke-boxes slowed the rate of fire for the guns. When mounted in a turret, the crew for a XV-inch Dahlgren was 10 including powdermen. These were carried on Passaic (1 XI-inch and 1 XV-inch short) and early Canonicus-class monitors. 15-inch Dahlgren guns for the Russian version of the Passaic, the Uragan class, were produced at the new Aleksandrovsk gun factory in Petrozavodsk in Russian Karelia.

XV-inch Dahlgren shell gun (long or "Tecumseh"): 86 were cast by the Alger, Fort Pitt, and Seyfert, McManus & Co. foundries between 1864 and 1872 (Ten Brink 2000). The new XV-inch gun was lengthened 16 inches so that the muzzle was flush with the outside of the turret when fired, eliminating the need for the smoke-box, Carried on later Canonicus-class monitors.

==== XX-inch ====
XX-inch Dahlgren shell gun: four were cast by the Fort Pitt Foundry between 1864 and 1867 as part of the original planned armament for USS Puritan. Three of these, named 'Satan', 'Lucifer' and 'Moloch' were accepted by the U.S. Navy, but saw no service. The fourth gun, named 'Beelzebub' was sold to Peru, where it became part of the defenses of Callao.

=== Dahlgren shell guns and Rodman casting ===
The navy's demand for 15-inch guns to defeat the new Confederate ironclads placed Dahlgren in a dilemma. All of his earlier shell guns had been cast solid, then had the bore drilled out—the traditional way to make artillery. Dahlgren's efforts with the XIII-inch shell gun were unsatisfactory and it was not clear that he could solid cast a 15-inch gun. However 15-inch guns had been successfully cast using the hollow casting technique developed by Thomas Jackson Rodman. In his method the gun was cast around a pipe. As the casting cooled, a smaller pipe was inserted into the first and water was pumped through the small pipe. At the same time hot coals were placed against the outside of the casting. This caused the casting to cool slowly from the inside out. As the outer parts of the casting cooled, they compressed the already cooled inner parts, making a stronger gun. The Bureau of Ordnance ordered that the Dahlgren XV-inch and XX-inch shell guns be cast using the Rodman hollow casting method. This use of Rodman hollow casting with a Dahlgren designed gun led to friction between Dahlgren and the Bureau of Ordnance, as well as some confusion in nomenclature.

=== Table of Dahlgren shell and related guns ===
Designation (bore)	Length Overall	Weight of gun	Weight of shot	Weight of shell	Service charge	Range (yards)
32-pdr. of 27 cwt. (6.2 inch)	93.72 in.	3,200 lb.	32 lb.	26.5 lb.	4 lb.	1,637 @ 6° elev.
32-pdr of 4,500 lb. M.1864 (6.2 inch)	107.5 in.	4,500 lb.	32 lb.	26.5 lb.	6 lb.	1,756 @ 5° elev.
VIII-inch	115.5 in.	6,500 lb.	65 lb.	52.7 lb.	7 lb.	2,600 @ 11° elev.
IX-inch	131 in.	9,000 lb.	90 lb.	73.5 lb.	13 lb.	3,450 @ 15° elev.
X-inch	146 in.*	12,000 lb.	124 lb.	101.5 lb.	12.5 lb.	3,000 @ 11° elev.
X-inch (heavy)	145 in.*	16,500 lb.	124 lb.	101.5 lb.	18 lb.	—
XI-inch	161 in.	15,700 lb.	166 lb.	133.5 lb.	20 lb.	3,650 @ 15° elev.
XIII-inch	162 in.*	36,000 lb.	276 lb.	216.5 lb.	40 lb.	—
XV-inch short "Passaic"	162 in.*	42,000 lb.	440 lb.	352 lb.	35 lb.	2,100 @ 7° elev.
XV-inch long "Tecumseh"	178 in.*	43,000 lb.	440 lb.	352 lb.	35 lb.	2,100 @ 7° elev.
XX-inch	204 in.	100,000 lb.	1,080 lb.*	—	100 lbs.	—

Estimated values are indicated by an asterisk. Estimates by (Ripley 1984, pp. 369–370), except for the estimate of the overall length of the X-inch (heavy) which is based on a bore length of 117.75 inches and the estimate of the weight of the XX-inch shell which is based on the weight of the shell for the Columbiad, Seacoast, 20-inch, Model 1864.

== Dahlgren rifled guns ==
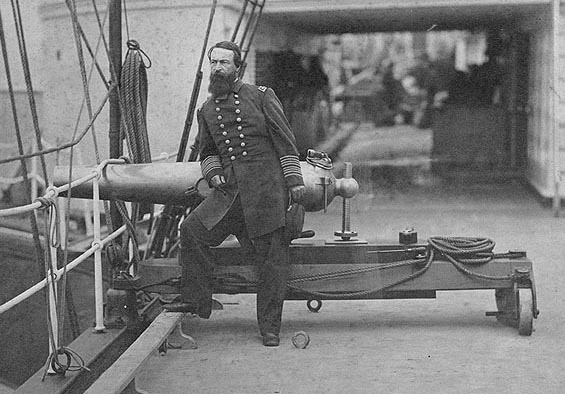
Admiral David Dixon Porter, USN, Commander, North Atlantic Blockading Squadron, on the main deck of his flagship, USS Malvern, leaning against a 20-pounder Dahlgren Rifle in 1864

Dahlgren also designed several rifled muzzle-loading cannon.

Twenty-pounder rifle: an entirely bronze gun that was popular and was the only Dahlgren rifle (other than the 12-pounder boat howitzer) that continued in service after the American Civil War. Crew of six and a powder-boy, firing a 20 lb. shell in front of 2 lb. of powder it had a range of 1,960 yards at a 6.5° elevation.

Thirty-pounder rifle: these guns were iron with bronze trunnions and trunnion bands. They were cast at the Fort Pitt Foundry and the Washington Navy Yard. In February 1862, Dahlgren recommended that the first 13 cast at Fort Pitt be withdrawn because the iron was inferior. One 30-pounder rifle was mounted on USS Harriet Lane.

Fifty-pounder rifle: these guns were typical Dahlgren rifles—iron with bronze trunnions and trunnion bands. They were apparently a popular design, although by the end of the war it had been supplanted by the 60-pounder Parrott rifle, which continued in service after the American Civil War. A photograph of Admiral Dahlgren leaning against a 50-pounder rifle may be found at the beginning of this article.

Eighty-pounder rifle: the first 80-pounder was cast at the West Point foundry with trunnions. Subsequent rifles were cast without trunnions and bronze trunnion band and trunnions were added. The gun was initially well received but soon showed a tendency to burst. USS Hetzel, a converted Coastal Survey ship armed with one IX-inch Dahlgren and one 80-pounder Dahlgren rifle was engaged in the bombardment of Roanoke Island in support amphibious landings, when the following entry was made in her log for February 7, 1862: "At 5:15, rifled 80-pounder aft, loaded with six pounds powder and solid Dahlgren shot, 80 pounds, burst in the act of firing into four principal pieces. The gun forward of the trunnions fell on deck. One third of the breech passed over the mastheads and fell clear of the ship on the starboard bow. One struck on port quarter. And the fourth piece, weighing about 1,000 pounds, driving through the deck and magazine, bringing up on the keelson, set fire to the ship. Fire promptly extinguished." (Ripley 1984, p. 106)

One hundred-fifty-pounder rifle: the 150-pounder was a typical Dahlgren rifle with a cast iron barrel and a bronze trunnion band and trunnions. Although the test firing was successful the guns were not placed in service, because Dahlgren doubted the quality of the iron.

Twelve-inch rifle: in 1864 the Fort Pitt foundry bored three XV-inch Dahlgren shell gun blanks, one was finished using the Atwater design, one with the Parrott design, and one with the Rodman approach. The Rodman solid shot weighed 618 to 619 pounds and the Atwater solid shot 416 to 535 pounds. The weights of the Parrott projectiles are not recorded. In 1867, at Fort Monroe, the guns were tested with charges varying between 35 and 55 pounds until the guns failed.

=== Table of Dahlgren rifled guns ===
Designation	Bore	Length overall	Weight of gun	Service charge	Number made
20-pdr rifle	4 in.	—	1,340 lb.	2 lb.	100
30-pdr rifle	4.2 inc.	92 in.	3,200 pounds	—	55
50-pdr rifle	5.1 in.	107 in.	3,596 lb.	—	34
80-pdr rifle	6 in.	—	—	6 lb.	14
150-pdr rifle	7.5 in.	140 in.*	—	—	5
12 in. rifle	12 in.	178 in.*	45,500 lb.	35–55 lb.	3

Estimated values are indicated by an asterisk. Estimates by (Ripley 1984, pp. 369–370).

== See also ==
- Armstrong gun
- USS Monitor
