= Sylvanus Sawyer =

American inventor (1822–1895)

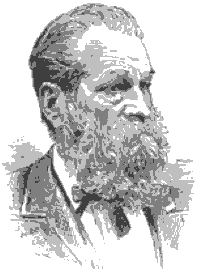
- Born: 15 April 1822; Templeton, Massachusetts
- Died: 13 October 1895 (aged 73); Fitchburg, Massachusetts
- Resting place: Pine Grove Cemetery, Templeton, Massachusetts
- Occupations: Inventor, manufacturing engineer
- Years active: circa 1843–circa 1885
- Employer(s): Self, founder of American Rattan Company, Fitchburg, MA
- Known for: Rattan processing machinery, artillery and projectiles

Sylvanus Sawyer (15 April 1822 in Templeton, Massachusetts – 13 October 1895, in Fitchburg, Massachusetts) was a United States inventor.

== Biography ==
John Sawyer, his father, was a farmer, mill owner and lumberman. His mother was Lucy Balcolm Sawyer. His siblings included Addison M., Joseph B., Catharine H., Mary W., and Aurelia M. Sawyer. Joseph and Addison were Sylvanus' business partners, and Addison was Sylvanus' co-inventor on at least one artillery ammunition patent, as well as receiving at least two patents on his own. From childhood Sylvanus showed great mechanical ingenuity; while he was a lad, he invented a reed organ. Due to an injury at age 12, from then until age 21 feeble health unfitted him for farm labor, and he occupied himself largely with carpenter's and smith's tools. In 1839 he went to Augusta, Maine, with a view of working with his brother-in-law, a gunsmith, and, though his health soon forced him to return, he learned to repair firearms and do much similar work, in which he engaged until his majority at age 21. During this time he also made several inventions, including a steam engine, a screw propeller, and a small foot-powered railroad car. However, lacking capital and experience, he was unable to manufacture any of these or otherwise profit from them, and they became public property.

He went to Boston about 1843 and, while working in a machine shop there, invented a machine for preparing chair cane from rattan. Thousands of dollars had previously been spent in vain attempts to construct such a machine, but Sawyer's was successful, and after it was patented, on 24 June 1851 ("machinery for cutting rattan"), he and his brother Joseph established a shop in East Templeton, where they manufactured chair cane with it. In the following December, the American Rattan Company was formed to use their machine, and erected a large shop in Fitchburg, Massachusetts. Sawyer devised several auxiliary rattan-processing machines through at least 1855, and, besides serving as director, was manager of the company's shop. His inventions were said to have entirely revolutionized the chair cane business, transferring it from southern India, China, and the Netherlands to the United States.

In the summer of 1853 he invented improvements in rifled cannon projectiles, which were patented in 1855. These included the placing of a coating of lead or other soft metal on the rear and sides of the shell, which was expanded laterally by the discharge and prevented the "windage" or passage of gas by the projectile, also filling the grooves of the rifling and obviating the use of helical projections. An arrangement of a percussion cap insured the explosion of the shell on impact.

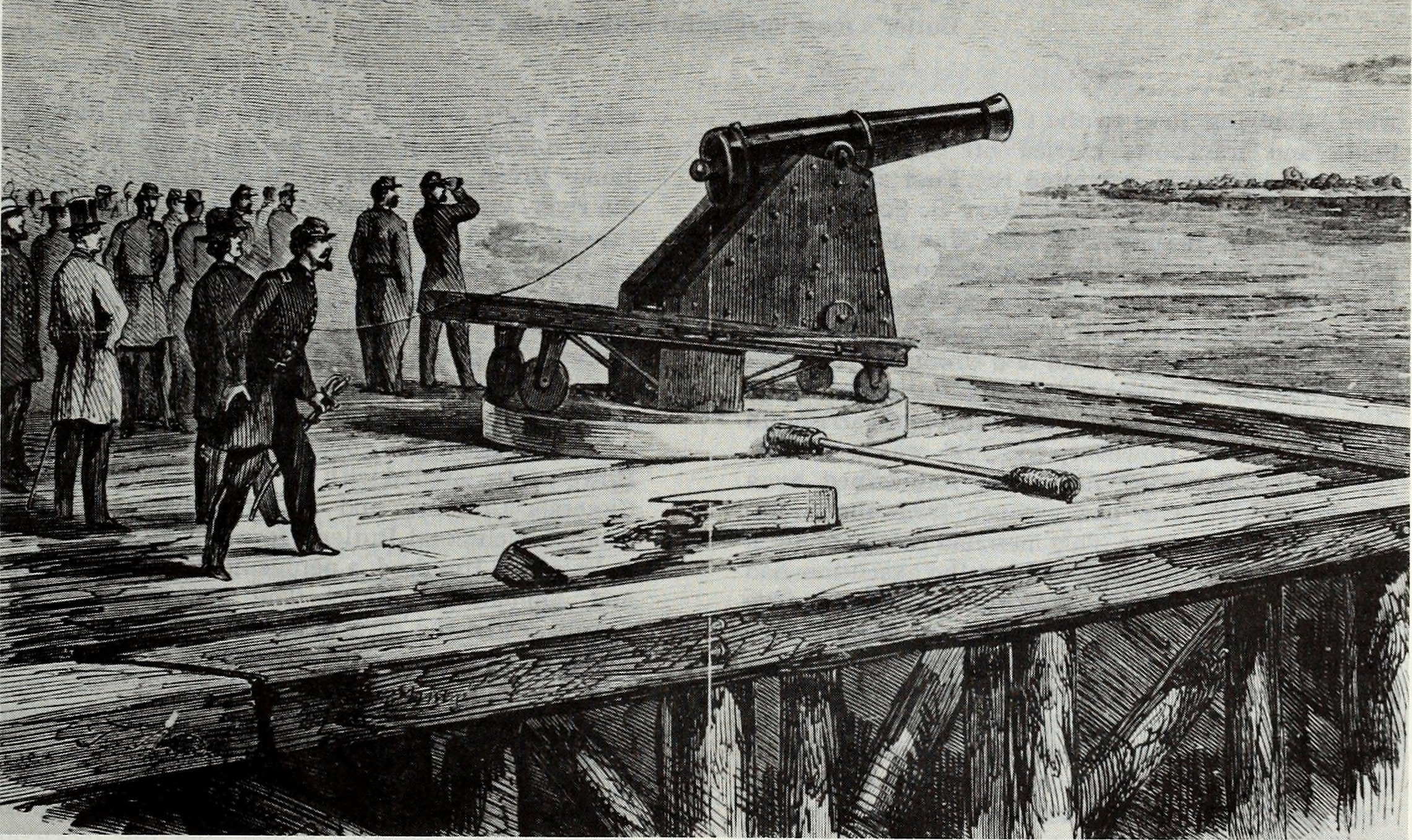
The Sawyer gun being demonstrated by Major General Benjamin Butler for Major General Wool at the Rip Raps (Fort Calhoun), 1861

In 1857–58, with his brother Addison, Sawyer conducted experiments on his invention, at his own expense, for the benefit of the U.S. Ordnance Bureau. A further successful trial with a weapon of 24-pounder (5.86-inch) bore firing 42-pound rifled projectiles was conducted in 1859 at Fort Monroe. The Secretary of War announced that the practicability of rifled cannon and projectiles had at last been demonstrated. It was recommended that four field guns be issued for practice, but before the order was carried into effect the American Civil War had begun. Sawyer delivered the U.S. Army's first cast steel rifled artillery weapon, a 9-pounder ordered in June 1861. The 24-pounders designed by Sawyer were mounted at Newport News, Virginia, with one on the Rip Raps (Fort Calhoun, later Fort Wool) in mid-1861. An illustration of the latter weapon shows it mounted on a high-angle carriage. The gun at Fort Wool was the only land-based Union gun in Hampton Roads that could reach the Confederate Sewell's Point battery, a distance of two miles, which it did with great accuracy, damaging the railroad iron-clad batteries. A 32-pounder (or 30-pounder) Sawyer rifle (of 12-pounder (4.62-inch) bore) also did "great execution" on board the armed steam tug Fanny, but the Confederates captured this vessel on 1 October 1861. The Union recaptured her remains after the Battle of Elizabeth City, North Carolina on 10 February 1862. Fanny was grounded and "blown up", but this gun was salvaged from her. It was preserved as a "30-pounder Sawyer rifle" at the Washington Navy Yard, D.C. as of 2012. The Fanny also had an "8-pounder rifled cannon" that may have been a Sawyer design.

Sawyer claimed that he was treated unjustly by the ordnance officers during the Civil War. Notwithstanding the report in his favor, his guns were not extensively adopted, but his improvements were incorporated in others that, he said, were infringements on his patents. He was advised by government officials to wait until the war had ended and then prosecute the chiefs of ordnance of the army and navy, but they both died shortly after its close, and nothing had been done in the matter. But he received several orders for guns directly from department commanders, to whom he furnished what are said to be the first batteries of cast-steel rifled guns made in the United States. He patented other improvements in projectiles and fuzes in 1861–63, and in 1864–65 built a shop for the manufacture of ordnance, as he anticipated orders from the United States, Mexico, Brazil, and Chile, all of which he had negotiated with. However, the close of the wars in the United States and South America caused it to be turned to other uses.

He took out patents on dividers and calipers in 1867, a steam-generator in 1868, a sole sewing-machine in 1876, and a centering watchmaker's lathe on 10 July 1882. He subsequently engaged in the manufacture of watchmakers' tools, but soon retired from business, and took much interest in agriculture. In the early 1890s he developed a system for producing fertilizer by filtering Fitchburg's sewage.

He served as an alderman in Fitchburg.

== Sawyer artillery ==
Sylvanus Sawyer designed at least five types of rifled artillery guns and a full line of projectiles for them, including solid shot, shell, case-shot, and canister rounds. His company initials of "S. & A.M. Sawyer" or "S. & J.B. Sawyer", found on orders for his weapons, indicate that he partnered with his brothers Addison and Joseph in designing and manufacturing artillery. Both Sylvanus and Addison received patents for artillery projectiles and fuzes and were co-inventors on at least one patent. However, their weapons were only purchased in limited or experimental quantities by the U.S. Army and U.S. Navy. A December 1861 report from Major General Benjamin F. Butler to Major General George B. McClellan states "I have also nearly ready eight rifled 5- and 6-inch guns of the Sawyer pattern...". These may correspond to the 4.62-inch, 5-inch, and 5.82-inch weapons Sawyer designed.

=== 9-pounder rifle ===
A 9-pounder Sawyer rifle ordered in June 1861 is said to be the U.S. Army's first cast steel rifled weapon. Documentation survives for only one weapon of this type.

=== 3.67-inch rifle ===
The only Sawyer weapon that appears to have been produced in more than experimental quantity is a 3.67-inch cast steel rifle. This was the standard bore for a 6-pounder weapon firing round shot, and the weapon is usually referred to as a 6-pounder in period documentation. However, as usual for rifled artillery of this period, the elongated projectiles recovered from the Port Hudson battlefield made for this weapon range from 12 pounds (shell with percussion fuze) to 16 pounds (solid bolt). The 2nd Vermont Battery was armed with six 3.67-inch Sawyer rifles at this battle. Surviving documentation as of 1983 showed that orders for these guns were made in December 1861 (3 guns), May 1864 (6 guns), and November 1864 (6 guns); there may have been other orders. One of these weapons survives in Minneapolis, Minnesota. Experts have noted that the rifling grooves on two surviving Sawyer weapons are 2-3 times as deep as is typical for Civil War weapons. This type of weapon was also used on U.S. Navy gunboats; a January 1865 report by Brigadier General Charles K. Graham, in command of a gunboat flotilla, to Major General E.O.C. Ord states that two of these weapons were on the side-wheeler Chamberlain and a mix of four guns each, either 3.67-inch Sawyers or 12-pound howitzers, were on the side-wheel light draft boats Burnside, Reno, Foster, and Parke.

=== 3-inch rifle ===
An order for three 3-inch cast steel Sawyer rifles was placed with Sawyer in December 1861. One weapon believed to be from this order survived in Fitchburg, MA as of 1997. Unusually, the order was placed with "A.M. Sawyer" vice the usual "S. & A.M. Sawyer", A.M. being Sylvanus' brother Addison. The date (31 December 1861) and weight (785 lbs.) are the same as those for an order of three 3.67-inch rifles.

=== 4.62-inch (30-pounder) rifle ===
Two 4.62-inch (12-pounder bore) rifled Sawyer guns survived the Civil War; one as of 2012 at the Washington Navy Yard, D.C., the other in private hands in Vermont as of 1997. Both of these were made by Cyrus Alger and Co. The former gun was on the Union's armed steam tug Fanny, captured by the Confederates on 1 October 1862 and recaptured after the Battle of Elizabeth City, North Carolina on 10 February 1862, and is stamped "1856". A Naval Historical Foundation web page notes that the weapon has an erroneous inscription stating that it was captured from the CSS Louisiana. The USS Louisiana was in the Elizabeth City battle, may have participated in the recovery of the weapon, and this may have led to the confusion. The weapon in Vermont in 1997 was on the USS Young Rover, a bark with sail and steam propulsion. The Navy Yard weapon is currently called a 30-pounder Sawyer rifle, and was described by the Confederates as a 32-pounder. Also on Fanny at the time the Confederates captured her was an "8-pounder rifled cannon" that may have been a Sawyer weapon.

=== 5-inch rifle ===
Orders for two 5-inch iron ("possibly Sawyer", perhaps due to the early date) rifles each were placed with Cyrus Alger and Co. in October and December 1861.

=== 24-pounder bore (5.82-inch) rifle ===
Four 24-pounder (5.82-inch) bore rifles machined from Model 1845 42-pounder smoothbore seacoast gun blocks were ordered in 1857–58. One of these was the "Sawyer gun" used at Fort Calhoun in 1861 with 42-pound shells. These were made at the West Point Foundry in Cold Spring, New York, with one delivered in 1857 and three in 1859. One is noted "for Mr. Sawyer's experiments" and another is noted "for Mr. Sigourney's experiments". A 24-pounder Sawyer gun tested at Fort Monroe had a recorded weight of 8,822 pounds, only one pound different from the delivered weight of the "Sigourney" gun. An unknown number of these weapons were in a battery at Newport News, Virginia in mid-1861, with one on the Rip Raps (Fort Calhoun, later Fort Wool) that attracted media attention for long-range fire on Confederate batteries at Sewell's Point. One of these and a 3.67-inch Sawyer rifle were in the siege train of the Siege of Richmond in 1864–65, as reported postwar by Henry Larcom Abbot, an engineer officer. However, the 24-pounder weapon burst at the tenth round, and the 3.67-inch and other smaller siege weapons were seldom used, only "to repel or aid assaults". One 24-pounder bore weapon survives as a memorial in Allegany, New York. Unusually, it has only two narrow rifling grooves.

== See also ==
- Field artillery in the American Civil War
- Siege artillery in the American Civil War

Contemporary rifled artillery

- James rifle
- Parrott rifle
- Brooke rifle
- Wiard rifle
