= USS Young Rover =

Gunboat of the United States Navy

History

United States
- Acquired: 27 July 1861
- Commissioned: 10 September 1861
- Decommissioned: 1865
- Fate: Sold, 22 June 1865

General characteristics
- Tonnage: 418
- Length: 141 ft (43 m)
- Beam: 28 ft 1 in (8.56 m)
- Draft: 11 ft (3.4 m)
- Propulsion: sail; steam engine
- Speed: 13 knots (24 km/h; 15 mph)
- Armament: one 12-pounder Sawyer rifle; four 32-pounder guns

USS Young Rover was a bark with an auxiliary steam engine acquired by the Union Navy during the American Civil War. She was used by the Union Navy as a gunboat in support of the Union Navy blockade of Confederate waterways.

== Service history ==
Young Rover, a bark with auxiliary steam propulsion, was purchased by the Navy at Boston, Massachusetts, on 27 July 1861; converted to naval service at the Boston Navy Yard; and commissioned there on 10 September 1861, Acting Master I. B. Studley in command. On 6 September, the warship received orders to report for duty with the Atlantic Blockading Squadron. She arrived in Hampton Roads, Virginia, on the 17th and was soon dispatched to blockade duty off the Carolinas. On 1 November, she brought help and stood by during the rescue of a United States Marine Corps battalion and the ship's company of the chartered steamer Governor which soon thereafter sank in a heavy gale off the southern Atlantic coast. Later that month, she returned to Hampton Roads and blockaded the mouth of the York River. The warship operated out of Hampton Roads into the spring of 1862 serving as a unit of the North Atlantic Blockading Squadron which was laboring to seal off the Confederate coast.

On 17 April 1862, Young Rover was reassigned to the Potomac River Flotilla to guard against the traffic in supplies to the South between Maryland and Virginia. That assignment lasted less than a month. On 14 May 1862, she received orders to join the East Gulf Blockading Squadron at Key West, Florida. She served briefly off the South Pass at the mouth of the Apalachicola River in far northwestern Florida and then settled down to a summer's worth of duty blockading St. Marks, Florida, on Apalachee Bay where the gulf coast of Florida begins its southward turn, and the Florida panhandle becomes a peninsula. She returned to Key West early in October and, on the 11th, received orders to proceed to Philadelphia, Pennsylvania, for repairs. At the conclusion of the yard work, she resumed duty along the Atlantic Ocean coast from the base at Hampton Roads and remained so employed during the winter of 1862 and 1863.

After repairs at Baltimore, Maryland, in April and May she returned to Hampton Roads where she began duty as guardship as a consequence of her deteriorating sailing and her almost nonexistent steaming abilities. That assignment, conducted at various locations in the southern Chesapeake Bay -- Fortress Monroe, Hampton Roads, and at the mouths of the James and York Rivers—occupied her until the fall of 1864. On 20 November she received orders to proceed to the Delaware breakwater, there to protect American shipping entering and leaving the Delaware. She departed Hampton Roads on 1 December and arrived at the mouth of the Delaware River several days later. For the remainder of the war, she served on the Delaware River under the cognizance of the Commandant, Philadelphia Navy Yard. Following the collapse of the Confederacy, Young Rover was sold at auction at the Boston Navy Yard on 22 June 1865.

== Surviving weapon ==
As of 1997 an unusual 4.62-inch rifled Sawyer gun (Alger #1177, 1861) previously on Young Rover survived in private hands in Vermont.
