= James rifle =

Type of artillery gun

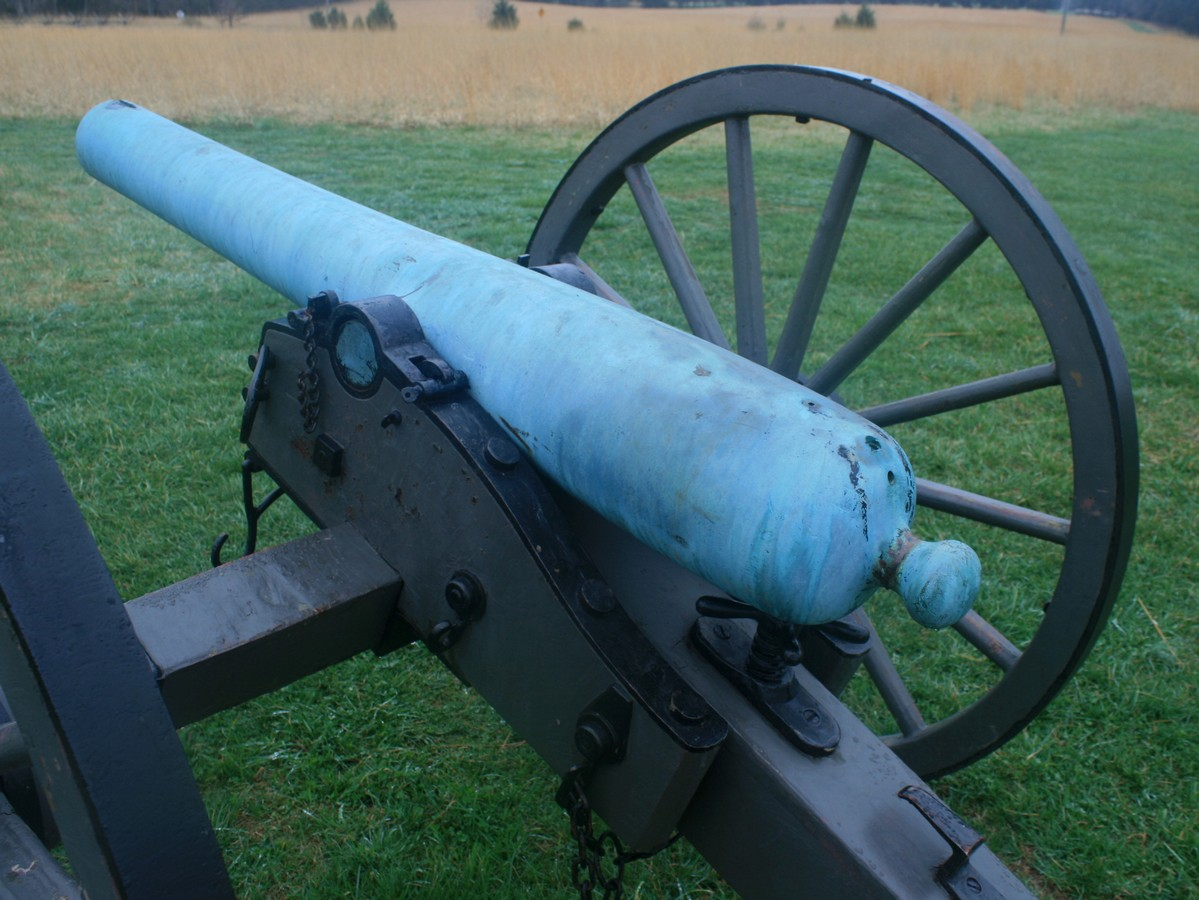
A 14-pounder (6.35 kg) (3.8 in (97 mm)) James rifle on the First Bull Run battlefield, the only weapon entirely designed by James adopted by the US Army.

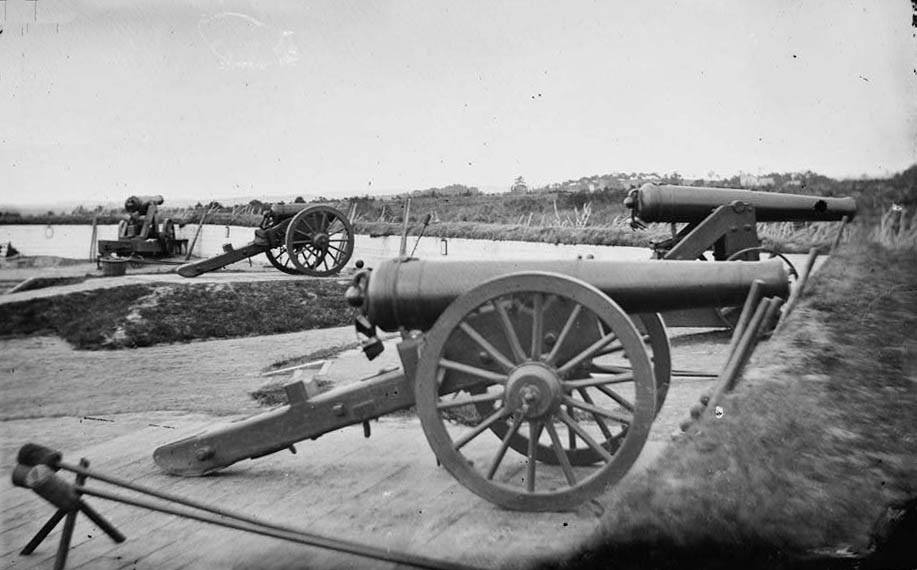
Two Model 1829 32-pounder (14.5 kg) seacoast guns, rifled by the James method (sometimes called 64-pdr (29 kg) James rifles). The one in the foreground is on a siege carriage. The one behind is on an iron, front pintle, barbette carriage.

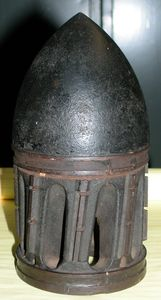
A James pattern solid shot. The “birdcage” at the base would have been covered by sheet lead which, upon firing the gun, would have expanded into the grooves of the rifling.

James rifle is a generic term to describe any artillery gun rifled to the James pattern for use in the American Civil War, as used in some period documentation. Charles T. James developed a rifled projectile and rifling system. Modern authorities such as Warren Ripley and James Hazlett have suggested that the term "James rifle" only properly applies to 3.8 in (97 mm) bore field artillery pieces rifled to fire James' projectiles. They contend that the term does not apply to smoothbores that were later rifled to take the James projectiles in 3.67 in (93 mm) caliber or other calibers, and that those should instead be referred to as "Rifled 6 (or other) pounder", etc. The rifle was created in 1861.

== Field artillery ==
Early in the war there were many 6-pounder (2.72 kg) bronze smoothbore guns in service with the field artillery and few rifled pieces available. A number of these guns were rifled to fire the 3.67 in (93 mm) caliber James projectile. These are classified as "rifled 6-pounder guns" or alternately as 12-pounder (5.44 kg) James rifles.

James worked with Ames Manufacturing Company, Chicopee, Massachusetts to produce 3.8 in (97 mm) bore rifled cannon in at least six known variants, also firing James projectiles. Collectively, these are referred to as 14-pounder (6.35 kg) James rifles. The initial type was created by reaming existing 6-pounder (2.72 kg) Model 1841 guns to 3.8 in (97 mm), then rifling them. This eliminated any deviations from tube wear — a common problem with bronze cannon that had already seen service. The other five types were new pieces, all using the smooth curves of the Ordnance profile and thus resembling the more widely used iron 3-inch Ordnance rifle except for material (in most cases). The first five variants were bronze, while the final type was iron.

The James projectiles were falling out of favor by the time of the inventor's death in late 1862, and the various James rifles were gradually phased out of service in favor of other types. Those still in service often used Hotchkiss ammunition. A key factor in demise of these pieces was how quickly "bronze rifles became inaccurate through wear or stretching or both."

== Siege rifles ==
In the early part of the Civil War the Union army lacked heavy rifled siege artillery. To fill this gap, the army rifled existing heavy smoothbore pieces with the system developed by Charles T. James. Firing shot and shells also designed by James, these newly rifled guns gave good service during the April 1862 bombardment of Fort Pulaski, along with Parrott rifles. However, they were retired from front line service soon after, and the James projectiles were gradually replaced by Hotchkiss projectiles due to stripping of the lead sabot. The rapid reduction of Fort Pulaski was probably the James system's most significant contribution to the war. After the war, the event was used to justify stopping work on masonry forts and led to a brief period of new construction of earthwork forts.

Large caliber smoothbore guns rifled with James system

Name	Bore	Weight of projectile	Weight of gun	Length of gun
24-pdr (10.9 kg) M. 1839, rifled (48-pdr (21.8 kg) James rifle)	5.82 in (148 mm)	48 lb (21.8 kg) (shot)	5,790 lb (2,630 kg)	124 in (3,150 mm)
32-pdr (14.5 kg) M. 1829, rifled (64-pdr (29 kg) James rifle)	6.4 in (163 mm)	64 lb (29.0 kg) (shot)	7,531 lb (3,416 kg)	125 in (3,175 mm)
42-pdr (19.1 kg) M. 1841 rifle (84-pdr (38.2 kg) James rifle)	7 in (178 mm)	64 lb (29.0 kg) (shell): 81 lb (36.7 kg); (shot)	8,465 lb (3,840 kg)	129 in (3,277 mm)

== Surviving examples ==
Over 150 14-pounder James rifles survive, many of them at Shiloh National Military Park, Tennessee, including over 50 6-pounder weapons bored out to 3.8 inches and rifled. Other heavy guns with James rifling survive as well.

Several 14-pounder James rifles at the Manassas National Battlefield Park in Virginia commemorate the Providence Marine Corps of Artillery, which served in the First Battle of Bull Run as the First Rhode Island Battery with this type of weapon.

An iron rifled 14-pounder artillery piece, used by James in experiments at Napatree Point in Watch Hill, Rhode Island, is in the collection of the Newport Artillery Company.

== See also ==
- Field artillery in the American Civil War
- Siege artillery in the American Civil War

Contemporary rifled artillery

- Sawyer rifle
- Parrott rifle
- Brooke rifle
- Wiard rifle
