= Parrott rifle =

Muzzle loading artillery weapon

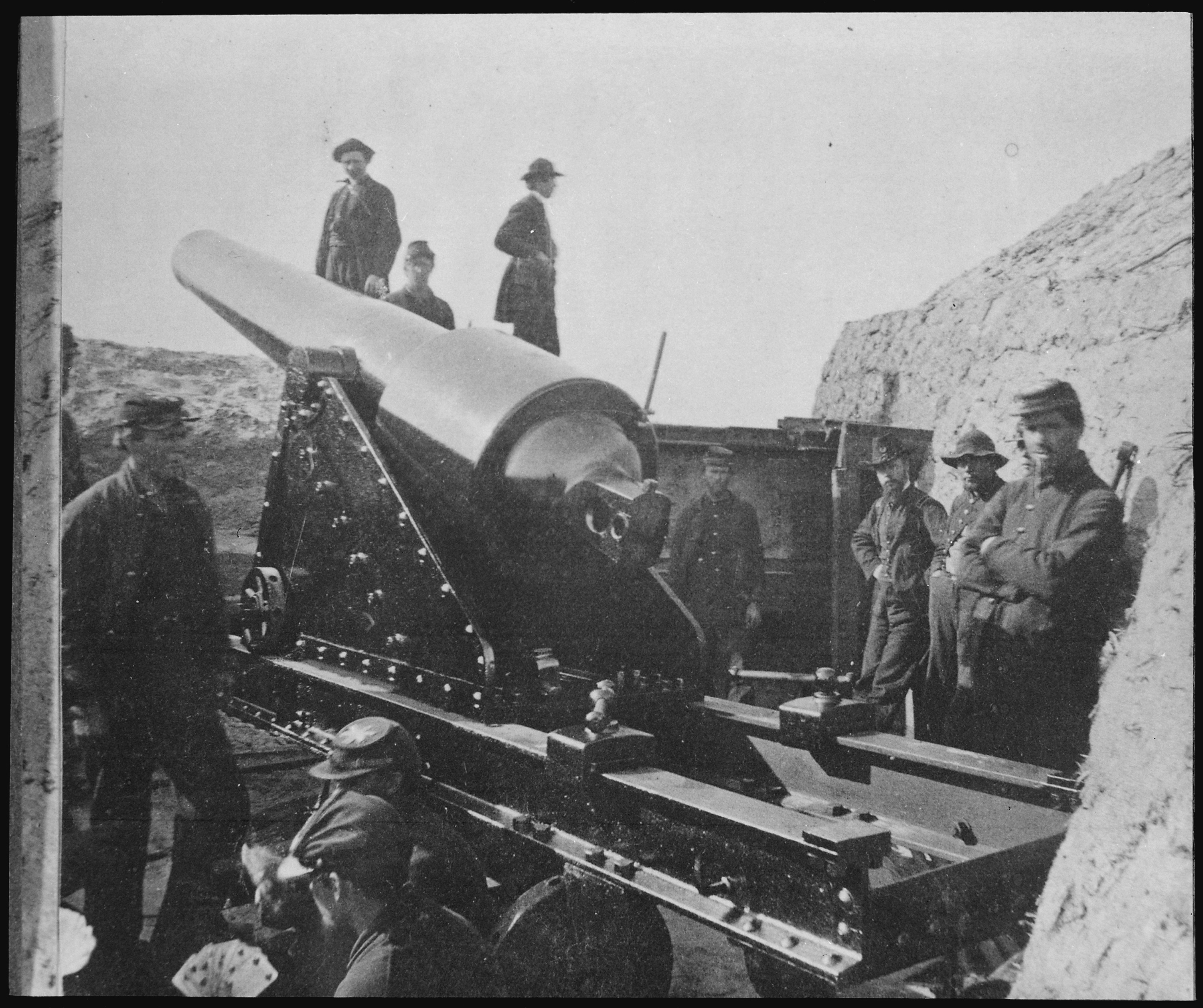
A 200-pounder Parrott rifle on Morris Island, South Carolina, 1865

The Parrott rifle was a type of muzzle-loading rifled artillery weapon used extensively in the American Civil War.

== Parrott rifle ==
The gun was invented by Captain Robert Parker Parrott, a West Point graduate. He resigned from the service in 1836 and became the superintendent of the West Point Foundry in Cold Spring, New York. He created the first Parrott rifle (and corresponding projectile) in 1860 and patented it in 1861. Daniel Treadwell, who developed a method for making built-up guns in the early 1840s, claimed that Parrott's patent infringed on Treadwell's earlier one, but in 1866 United States District Court court dismissed the case, deciding that Treadwell's claim was invalidated by a 1843 British patent to John Frith.

Parrotts were manufactured with a combination of cast and wrought iron. The cast iron made for an accurate gun, but was brittle enough to suffer fractures. Hence, a large wrought iron reinforcing band was overlaid on the breech to give it additional strength. There were earlier cannons designed this way, but the method of securing this band was the innovation that allowed the Parrott to overcome the deficiencies of these earlier models. It was applied to the gun red-hot and then the gun was turned while water was poured down the muzzle, allowing the band to attach uniformly. By the end of the Civil War, both sides were using this type of gun extensively.

Parrott rifles were manufactured in different sizes, from the 10-pounder up to the rare 300-pounder. The 20-pounder was the largest field gun used during the war, with the barrel alone weighing over 1,800 pounds (820 kg). Both the 10- and 20-pounders were used by both armies. The smaller size was much more prevalent; it came in two bore sizes: 2.9 inches (74 mm) and 3.0 inches (76 mm). Confederate forces used both bore sizes during the war, which added to the complication of supplying the appropriate ammunition to its batteries. Until 1864, Union batteries used only the 2.9 inches (74 mm). The M1863, with a 3.0-inch (76 mm) bore, had firing characteristics similar to the earlier model; it can be recognized by its straight barrel, without muzzle-swell. Its range was up to 2,000 yards (1,800 m) with a trained crew.

On June 23–24, 1862, President Abraham Lincoln made an unannounced visit to West Point, where he consulted with retired Gen. Winfield Scott regarding the handling of the Civil War and the staffing of the War Department. Following this meeting, President Lincoln visited the West Point Foundry at which the 100- and 200-pounder Parrott cannons were successfully demonstrated in live firing.

Naval versions of the 20-, 30-, 60-, and 100-pounder Parrotts were also used by the Union navy. The 100-pound naval Parrott could achieve a range of 6,900 yards (6,300 meters) at an elevation of 25 degrees, or fire an 80 lb (36 kg) shell 7,810 yards (7,140 m) at 30 degrees elevation.

Although accurate, as well as being cheaper and easier to make than most rifled artillery guns, the Parrott had a poor reputation for safety and they were shunned by many artillerists. At the end of 1862, Henry J. Hunt attempted to get the Parrott eliminated from the Army of the Potomac's inventory, preferring the 3-inch ordnance rifle. When the Parrott gun burst in battle, gunners would chip out the jagged parts and continue firing. In 1889, The New York Times called on the Ordnance Bureau of the War Department to discontinue use of the Parrott gun altogether, following a series of mishaps at the West Point training grounds.

Several hundred Parrott gun tubes remain today, many adorning battlefield parks, county courthouses, and museums. The gun tubes made by Parrott's foundry are identifiable by the letters WPF (West Point Foundry), along with a date stamp between 1860 and 1889, found on the front face of the gun tube. The first production Parrott gun tube (serial number 1) still exists, and is preserved on a reproduction gun carriage in the center square of Hanover, Pennsylvania, as part of a display commemorating the Battle of Hanover. A list of many of the surviving tubes can be found at the National Register of Surviving Civil War Artillery.

The larger sizes of Parrott rifles (100-pounder and up) were deployed in coast defense from 1863 to 1900, when they were replaced by Endicott period forts and weapons. Along with Rodman guns, some were deployed shortly after the outbreak of the Spanish–American War in 1898 as a stopgap; it was feared the Spanish fleet would bombard the United States East Coast.

== The 300-pound solution ==
By summer 1863, Union forces became frustrated by the heavily fortified Confederate position at Fort Sumter, and brought to bear the 10-inch (250 mm) Parrott, along with several smaller cannons. In all, two 80-pounder Whitworths, nine 100-pounder Parrotts, six 200-pounder Parrotts, and a 300-pounder Parrott were deployed. It was widely believed in the north that a massive 10-inch Parrott would finally break the previously impenetrable walls of the fort, which had become the symbol of stalwart steadfastness for the Confederacy.

The Washington Republican described the technical accomplishments of the 10-inch (25 cm) Parrott:

The breaching power of the 10-inch 300-pounder Parrott rifled gun, now about to be used against the brick walls of Fort Sumter, will best be understood by comparing it with the ordinary 24-pounder siege gun, which was the largest gun used for breaching during the Italian War.

The 24-pounder round shot, which starts with a velocity of 1,625 feet per second, strikes an object at the distance of 3,500 yards, with a velocity of about 300 feet per second. The 10-in rifle 300-pound shot has an initial velocity of 1,111 feet, and has afterward a remaining velocity of 700 feet per second, at a distance of 3,500 yards.

From well-known mechanical laws, the resistance which these projectiles are capable of overcoming is equal to 33,750 pounds and 1,914,150 pounds, raised one foot in a second respectively. Making allowances for the differences of the diameters of these projectiles, it will be found that their penetrating power will be 1 to 19.6. The penetration of the 24-pounder shot at 3,500 yards, in brick work, is 62 [sic?] inches. The penetration of the 10-inch projectile will therefore be between six and seven feet into the same material.

— The Washington Republican, August 12, 1863

The Union soldiers knew Fort Sumter's brick walls averaged about 5 feet (150 cm) thick, and thus recognized the potential for such a cannon to help them succeed in taking back their fort.

== Swamp Angel ==
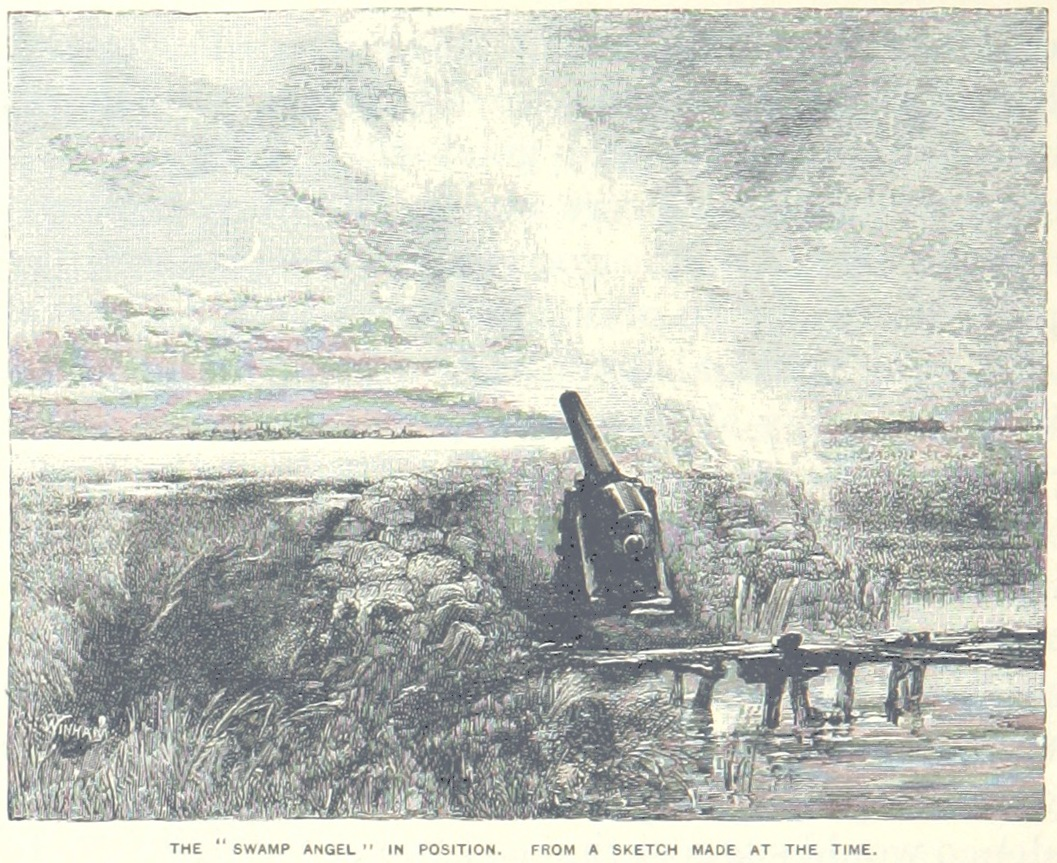
The Swamp Angel

A famous large 8-inch (200 mm) Parrott cannon, called the Swamp Angel, was used by federal Brigadier General Quincy Adams Gillmore to bombard Charleston, South Carolina. It was manned by the 11th Maine Volunteer Infantry Regiment.

On August 21, 1863 Gillmore sent Confederate general P. G. T. Beauregard an ultimatum to abandon heavily fortified positions at Morris Island or the city of Charleston would be shelled. When the positions were not evacuated within a few hours, Gillmore ordered the Parrott rifle to fire on the city. Between August 22 and August 23, the Swamp Angel fired on the city 36 times (the gun burst on the 36th round), using many incendiary shells which caused little damage and few casualties. The battle was made more famous by Herman Melville's poem "The Swamp Angel".

After the war, a damaged Parrott rifle said to be the Swamp Angel was moved to Trenton, New Jersey, where it rests as a memorial today at Cadwalader Park.

== Parrott rifles by size ==
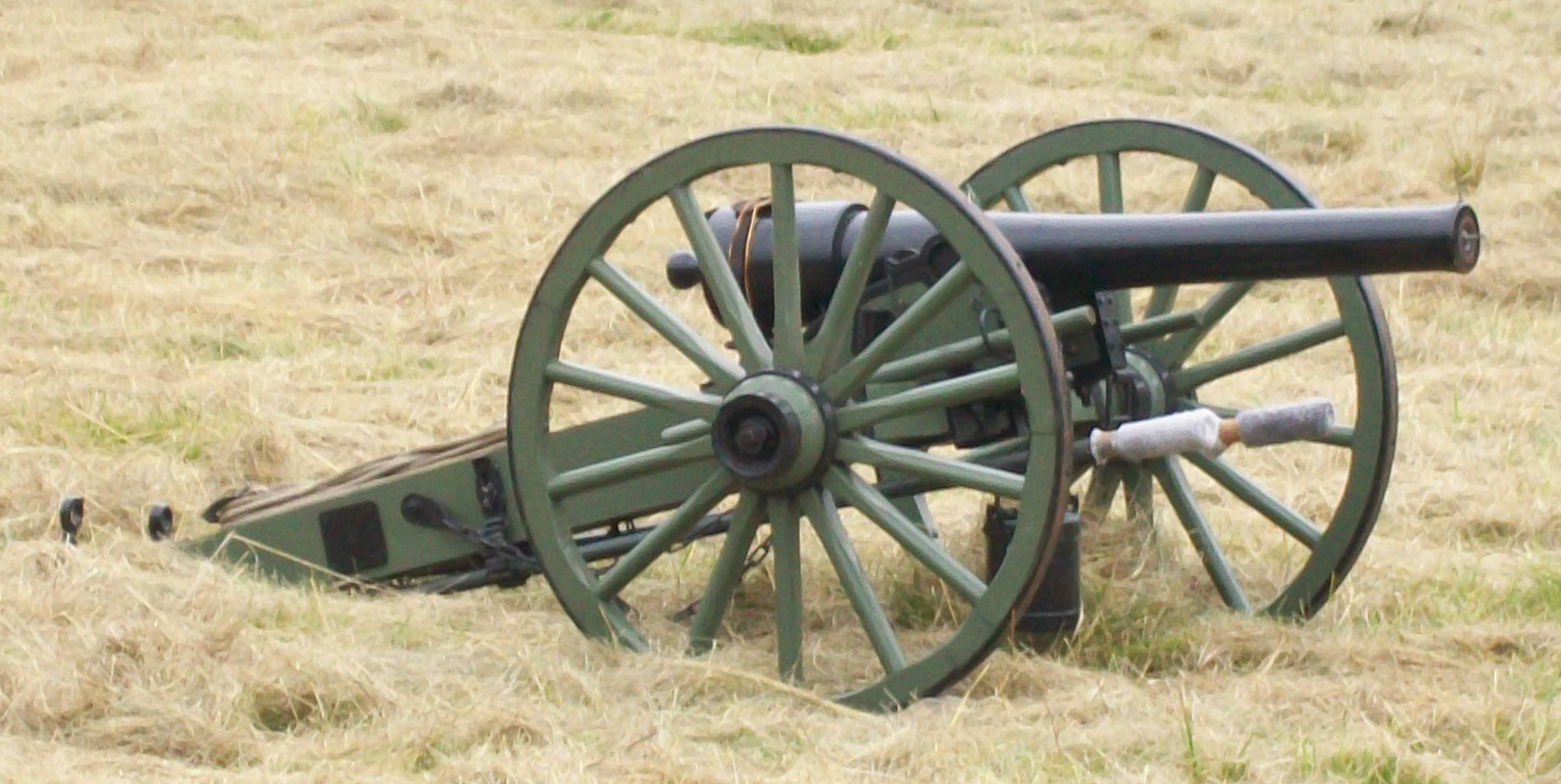
A replica 10-pound Army Parrott rifle.

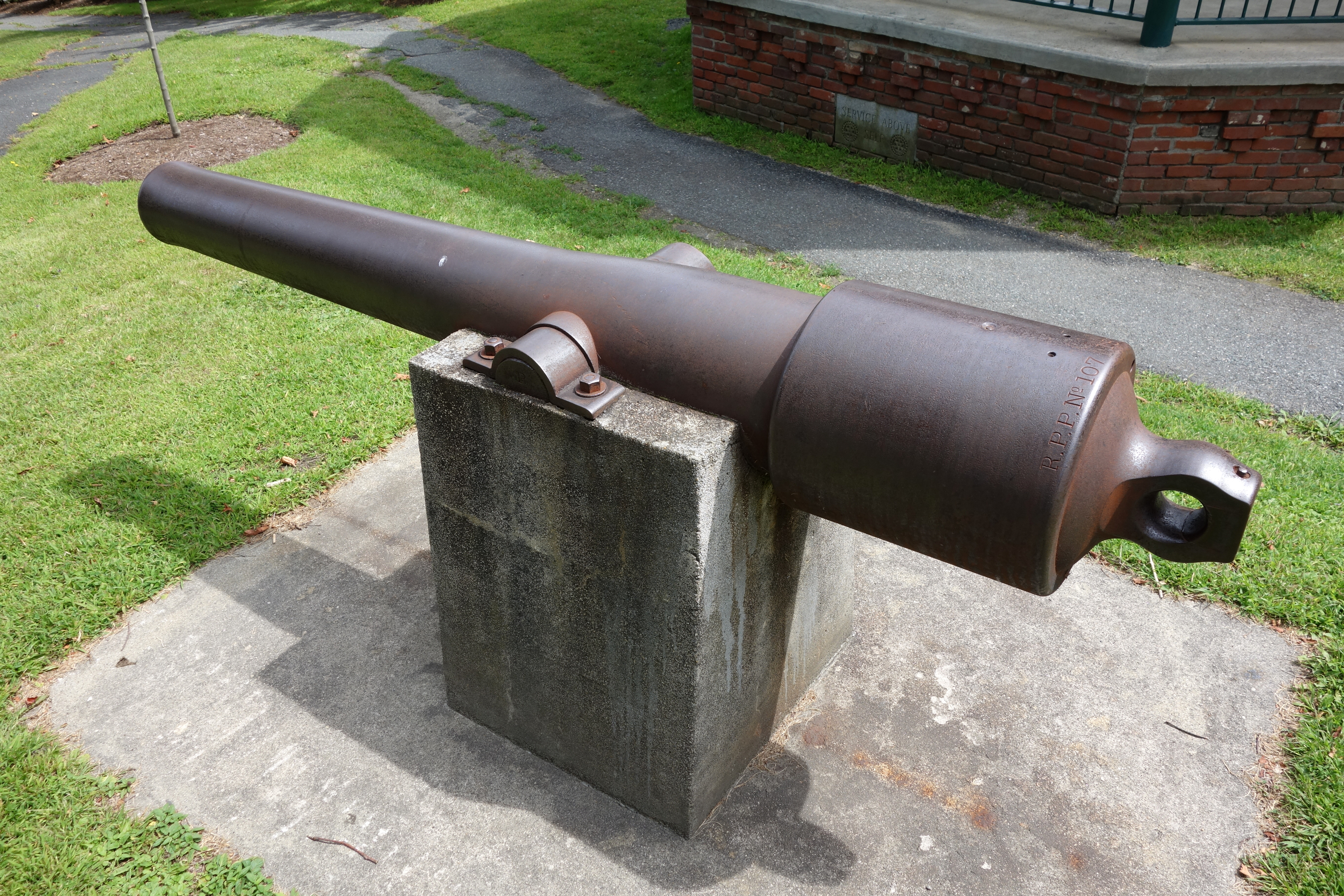
Parrott gun No. 107 (USS Kanawha), a 3.67-in (20-lb) Naval Parrott.

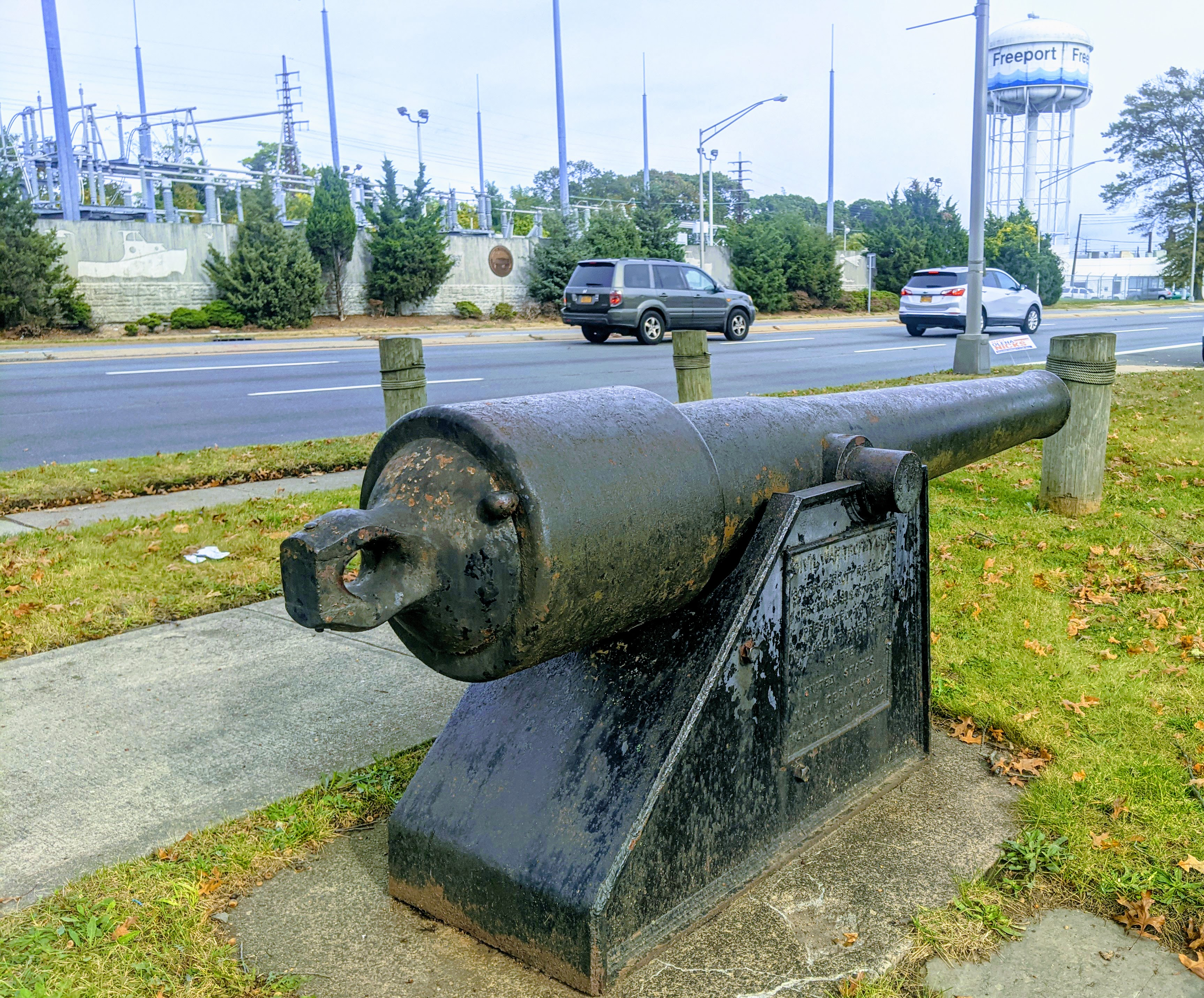
Parrot rifle in Freeport, New York, from USS Hartford, Adm Farragut's flagship in Mobile Bay.

Parrott Guns by Size
Model	Length	Weight	Munition	Charge size	Maximum range at elevation	Flight time	Crew size
2.9-in (10-lb) Army Parrott	73 in (190 cm)	890 lb (400 kg)	10 lb (4.5 kg) shell	1 lb (0.45 kg)	5,000 yd (4,600 m) at 20 degrees	21 secs	8
3.0-in (10-lb) Army Parrott	74 in (190 cm)	890 lb (400 kg)	10 lb (4.5 kg) shell	1 lb (0.45 kg)	1,830 yd (1,670 m) at 5 degrees	7 secs	8
3.67-in (20-lb) Army Parrott	79 in (200 cm)	1,795 lb (814 kg)	19 lb (8.6 kg) shell	2 lb (0.91 kg)	4,400 yd (4,000 m) at 15 degrees	17 secs	8
3.67-in (20-lb) Naval Parrott	81 in (210 cm)	1,795 lb (814 kg)	19 lb (8.6 kg) shell	2 lb (0.91 kg)	4,400 yd (4,000 m) at 15 degrees	17 secs	8
4.2-in (30-lb) Army Parrott	126 in (320 cm)	4,200 lb (1,900 kg)	29 lb (13 kg) shell	3.25 lb (1.47 kg)	6,700 yd (6,100 m) at 25 degrees	27 secs	9
4.2-in (30-lb) Naval Parrott	102 in (260 cm)	3,550 lb (1,610 kg)	29 lb (13 kg) shell	3.25 lb (1.47 kg)	6,700 yd (6,100 m) at 25 degrees	27 secs	9
5.3-in (60-lb) Naval Parrott	111 in (280 cm)	5,430 lb (2,460 kg)	50 lb (23 kg) or 60 lb (27 kg) shell	6 lb (2.7 kg)	7,400 yd (6,800 m) at 30 degrees	30 secs	14
5.3-in (60-lb) Naval Parrott (breechload)	111 in (280 cm)	5,242 lb (2,378 kg)	50-lb or 60 lb (27 kg) shell	6 lb (2.7 kg)	7,400 yd (6,800 m) at 30 degrees	30 secs	14
6.4-in (100-lb) Naval Parrott	138 in (350 cm)	9,727 lb (4,412 kg)	80 lb (36 kg) or 100 lb (45 kg) shell	10 lb (4.5 kg)	7,810 yd (7,140 m) at 30 degrees (80-lb)	32 secs	17
6.4-in (100-lb) Naval Parrott (breechload)	138 in (350 cm)	10,266 lb (4,657 kg)	80 lb (36 kg) or 100 lb (45 kg) shell	10 lb (4.5 kg)	7,810 yd (7,140 m) at 30 degrees (80-lb)	32 secs	17
8-in (150-lb) Naval Parrott	146 in (370 cm)	16,500 lb (7,500 kg)	150 lb (68 kg) shell	16 lb (7.3 kg)	8,000 yd (7,300 m) at 35 degrees	180	?
8-in (200-lb) Army Parrott	146 in (370 cm)	16,500 lb (7,500 kg)	200 lb (91 kg) shell	16 lb (7.3 kg)	8,000 yd (7,300 m) at 35 degrees	?	?
10-in (300-lb) Army Parrott	156 in (400 cm)	26,900 lb (12,200 kg)	300 lb (140 kg) shell	26 lb (12 kg)	9,000 yd (8,200 m) at 30 degrees	202.5 secs*	?

(*) This time is an educated guess, the time is unknown. Flight times appear to be extremely inaccurate. Example: 10-in (300-lb) projectile would have to average only 133 ft/s (41 m/s) to be in flight for 202 seconds to cover 9,000 yd (8,200 m). A more accurate estimate will be in the range of 30 seconds.

== See also ==
- Field artillery in the American Civil War
- Siege artillery in the American Civil War
- Civil War Defenses of Washington
- Rodman gun
- Seacoast defense in the United States

Contemporary rifled artillery

- James rifle
- Sawyer rifle
- Brooke rifle
- Wiard rifle
