= Wiard rifle =

American light artillery pieces

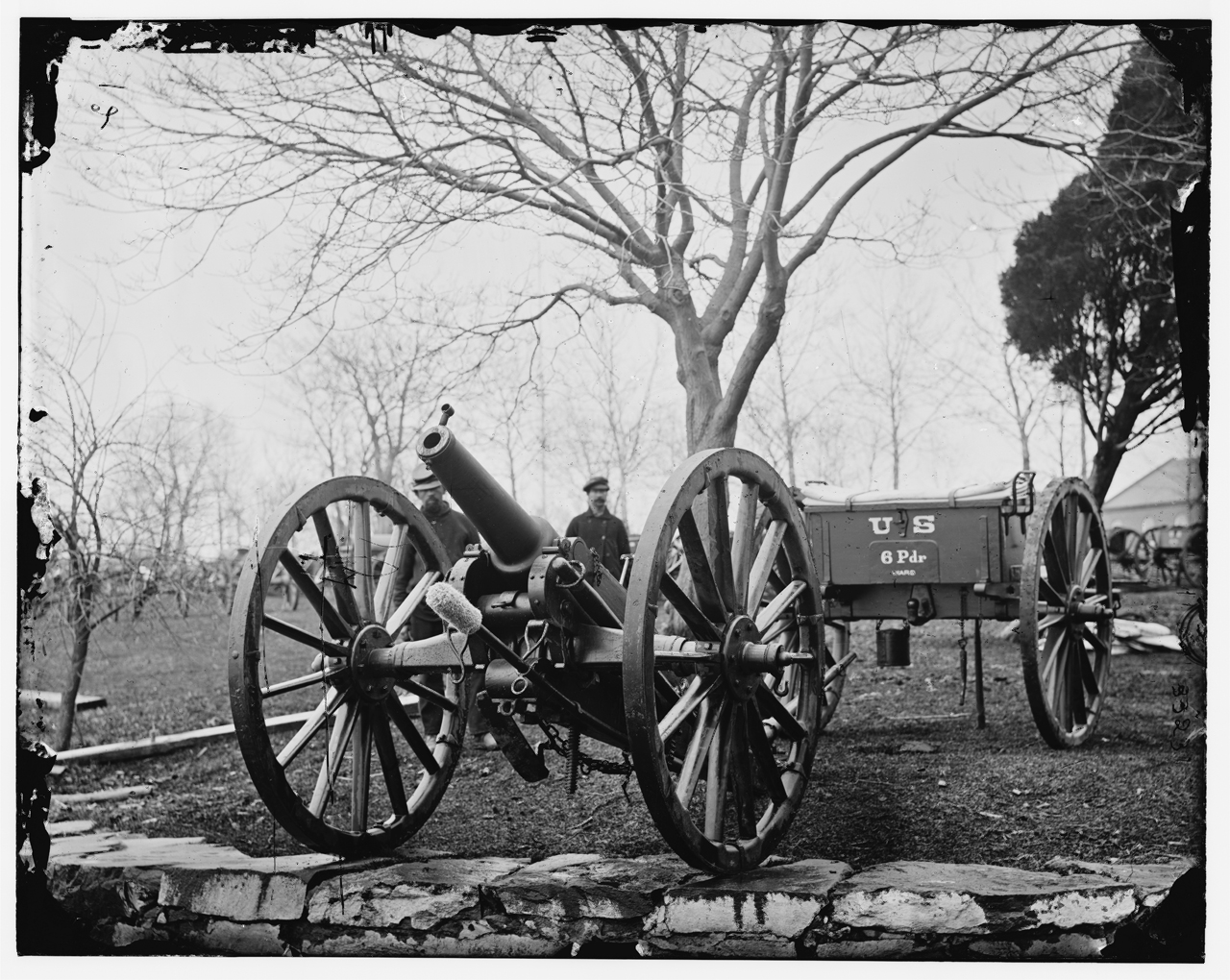
6-pdr (2.72 kg) Wiard gun and carriage at the Arsenal (now Fort McNair), Washington, D.C.

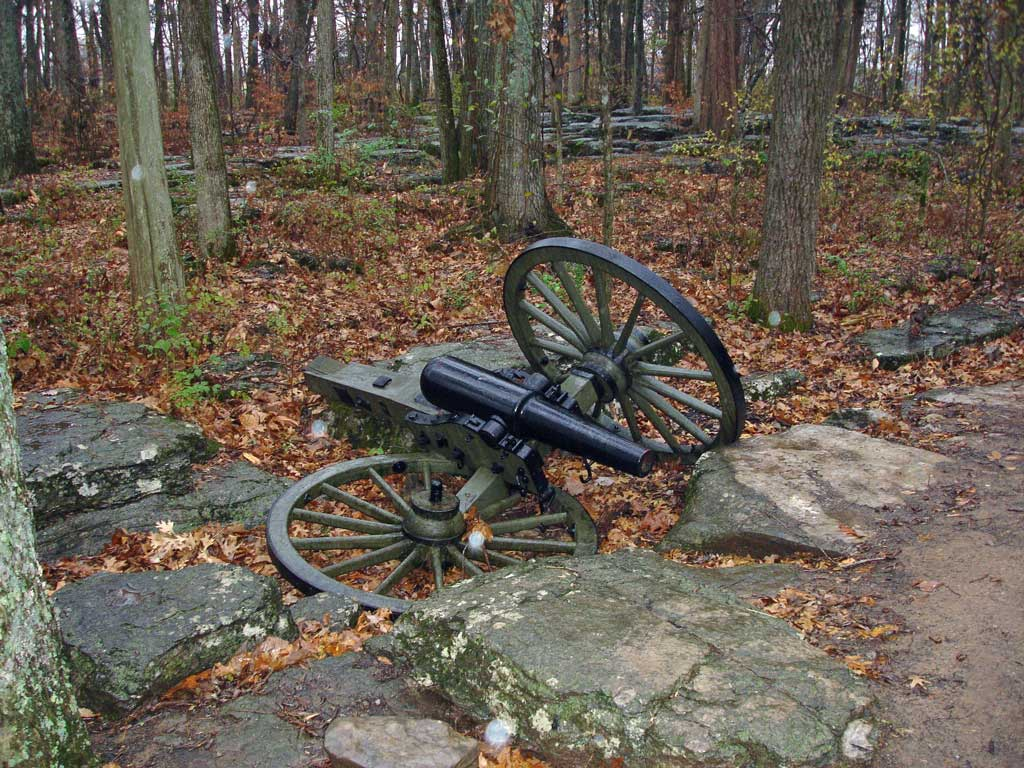
6-pdr (2.72 kg) Wiard gun with reproduction non-Wiard carriage at Stones River National Battlefield in Tennessee

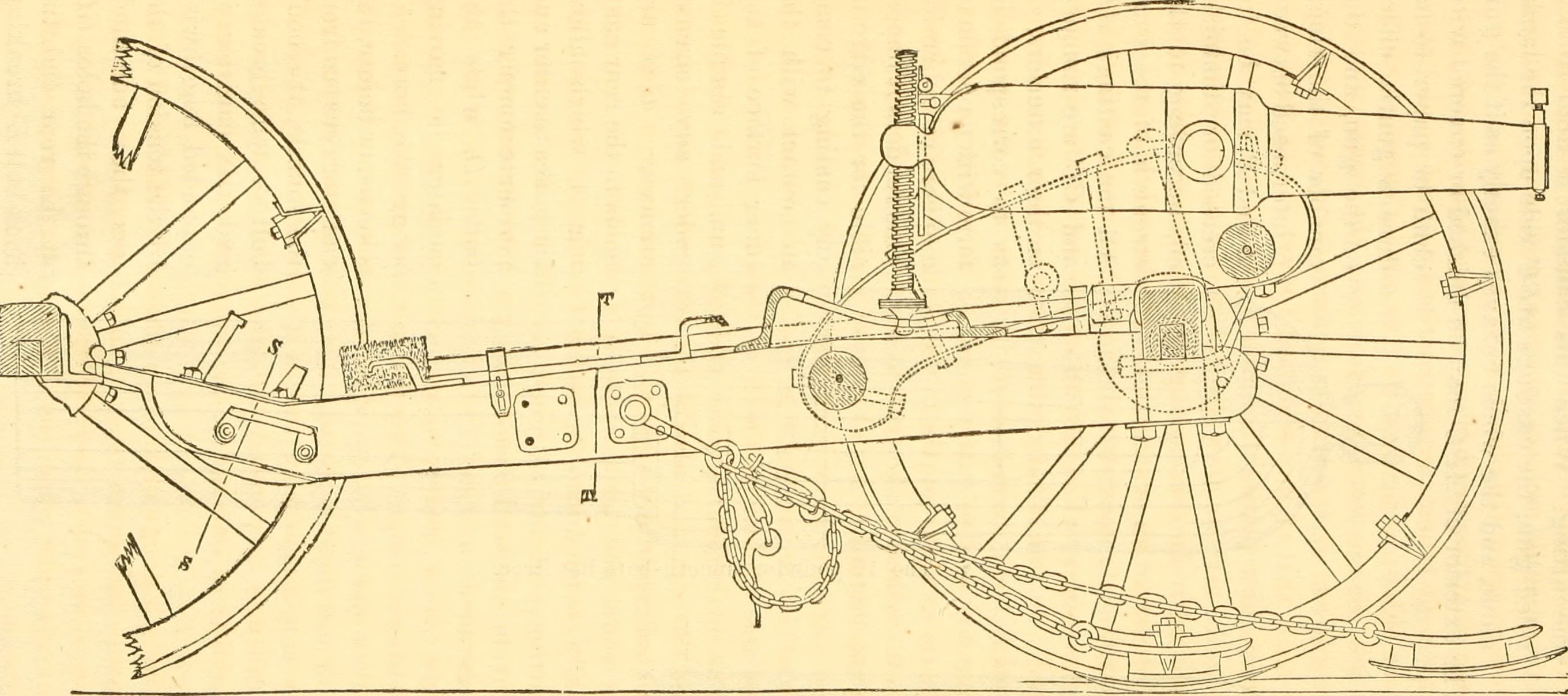
6-pdr (2.72 kg) Wiard gun and carriage. Production weapons lacked the cascabel and used a different elevating screw under the breech.

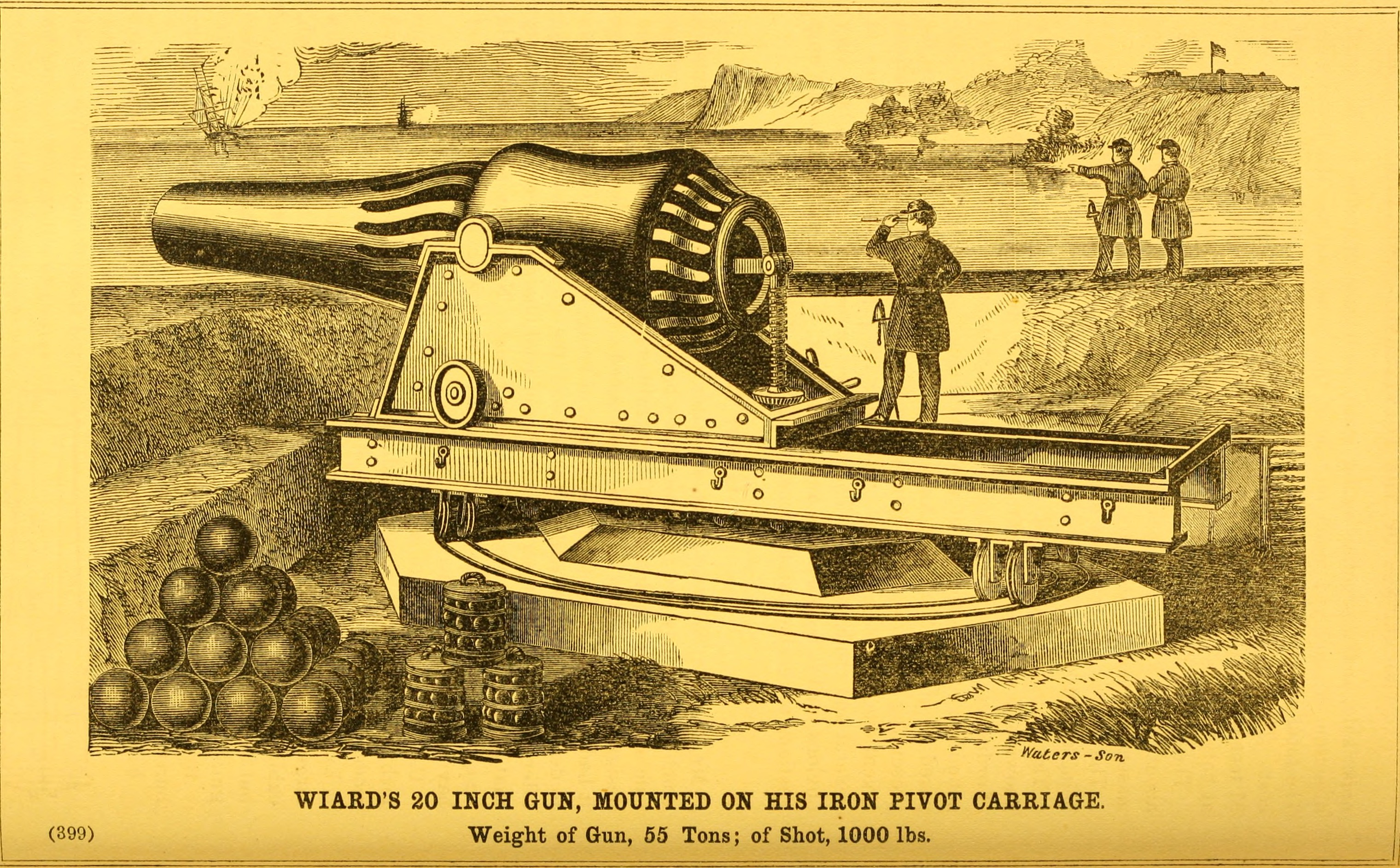
Proposed Wiard 20 in (510 mm) gun on a pivot carriage

The Wiard rifle refers to several weapons invented by Norman Wiard, most commonly a semi-steel light artillery piece in six-pounder and twelve-pounder calibers. About 60 were manufactured between 1861 and 1862 during the American Civil War, at O'Donnell's Foundry, New York City: "although apparently excellent weapons, [they] do not seem to have been very popular". Wiard also designed a rifled steel version of the Dahlgren boat howitzer (a 12-pounder (5.44 kg) weapon with a 3.4 in (86 mm) bore), among other gun types. Further, Wiard unsuccessfully attempted to develop a 15 in (381 mm) rifled gun for the US Navy and proposed a 20 in (510 mm) gun. In 1881 he unsuccessfully proposed various "combined rifle and smoothbore" weapon conversions of Rodman guns and Parrott rifles.

Wiard described two calibers: a six-pounder (2.72 kg) rifle with a 2.6 in (66 mm) bore, and a twelve-pounder (5.44 kg) smoothbore weapon with a 3.67 in (93 mm) bore. All survivors are rifled, though this may have occurred long after manufacture; this was a common practice during the war. Surviving Wiard guns vary considerably in manufacturing details and markings. Documentation survives for orders of 45 6-pounder Wiards, six 12-pounder 3.67 in (93 mm) Wiards (though at least 13 survive), and 12 12-pounder 3.4 in (86 mm) Wiard rifled howitzers.

== 6-pounder rifle ==
The six-pounder's tube was 53 in (135 cm) long, weighed 725 pounds (329 kg) and had an effective range (at 35°) of 7,000 yards (6,400 m), with a standard powder charge of 0.75 pounds (0.34 kg) and 6 lb. (2.72 kg) Hotchkiss bolt-type projectiles.

The 6-pdr Wiard rifle was cast in puddled wrought iron (semi-steel) and was mounted in a special Wiard field carriage that was unique in its design. The rim base was spaced farther apart than any diameter of the tube, permitting unrestricted rotation on the trunnions without interference from the undercarriage. Wiard altered the shape of the carriage's cheeks, relocated the axle and provided a long elevating screw; this made firing at elevation of up to 35 degrees possible. It also meant that one carriage could slide beneath the next, allowing for more efficient storage and transportation. Other innovations included a flat trail plate with a metal keel (preventing the rifle digging itself in the ground upon recoil), and a better system for braking the carriage without damaging the iron tires.

Reportedly, three artillery batteries associated with Union Major General Daniel Sickles' "Excelsior Brigade" were armed with 6-pdr and 12-pdr Wiard guns, possibly as a result of a friendship between Wiard and Sickles. Two batteries of six 6-pdr guns each were ordered specifically for that brigade in 1861. None of Wiard's weapons were widely adopted, and few survive today.

== 15-inch experimental rifle ==
Wiard published pamphlets claiming that thermal stress was the primary reason for burst cannon. This was a significant problem during the Civil War, especially with Parrott rifles. The US Navy Ordnance Department under Rear Admiral John A. Dahlgren awarded Wiard a contract to produce two 15 in (381 mm) rifled guns of about the same weight as the smoothbore XV-inch (381 mm) Dahlgren shell gun. Wiard was to be paid $10,750 in 1860s money for each gun. The result was probably one of the most complex guns ever cast in one piece. The reinforce area around the breech was nine inches larger diameter than the bore and concave in profile. Running through the reinforce were numerous fluted passages for cooling, made with shallow S-curves. One gun did not survive the manufacturing process when the numerous casting cores resisted removal; the other gun burst at its first shot. It appears no further development occurred, though an artist's concept of a similar proposed 20 in (510 mm) weapon survives.

== 1881 conversion proposals ==
In 1881 Wiard proposed to the Secretary of War the conversion of numerous existing Rodman and Parrott coast artillery weapons into considerably lengthened "combined rifle and smoothbore" guns, by cutting off the muzzle portions of the guns and bolting on a long rifled barrel extension. The conversions would be preceded by a number of experiments, including some breechloading conversions. His proposals were apparently rejected.

== Surviving examples ==
At least 24 6-pounder Wiard rifles survive. Examples can be seen on display in front of the Fayette County Courthouse in Uniontown, Pennsylvania, two in the US Army Field Artillery Museum at Fort Sill, Oklahoma, and four at Shiloh National Military Park with two at Stones River National Battlefield in Tennessee.

At least 13 rifled 12-pdr (3.67-inch) Wiards survive, including four at Shiloh National Military Park in Tennessee and three in private hands.

Two 12-pdr (3.4-inch) Wiard boat howitzers are at the National Museum of the United States Navy in the Washington Navy Yard, D.C. One each are in Charleston, South Carolina (at the Charleston Rifle Club) and Bellevue, Ohio.

Wiard-manufactured versions of the 3-inch Ordnance rifle are in Belchertown, Massachusetts and Ripley, Ohio.

== See also ==
- Parrott rifle
- Rodman gun
- Field artillery in the American Civil War
- Siege artillery in the American Civil War
- James rifle
- Sawyer rifle
