= Semi-steel =

Semi-steel casting is a lower cost method to produce a casting that is not quite as strong as a steel casting but less expensive to manufacture. It was used more commonly as a marketing term.

The carbon and silicon percentages are reduced to the amount approximately consistent with those in steel. This is done using pig iron or gray iron casting scrap and reducing the relative amount of carbon through the addition of relatively pure steel or wrought iron scrap in a well heated cupola furnace. The percentage of carbon is typically between foundry cast iron and wrought iron.

6-pounder and 12-pounder Wiard rifles designed by Norman Wiard and used in the American Civil War (1861–1865) were made of semi-steel (puddled wrought iron).
