= Siege artillery in the American Civil War =

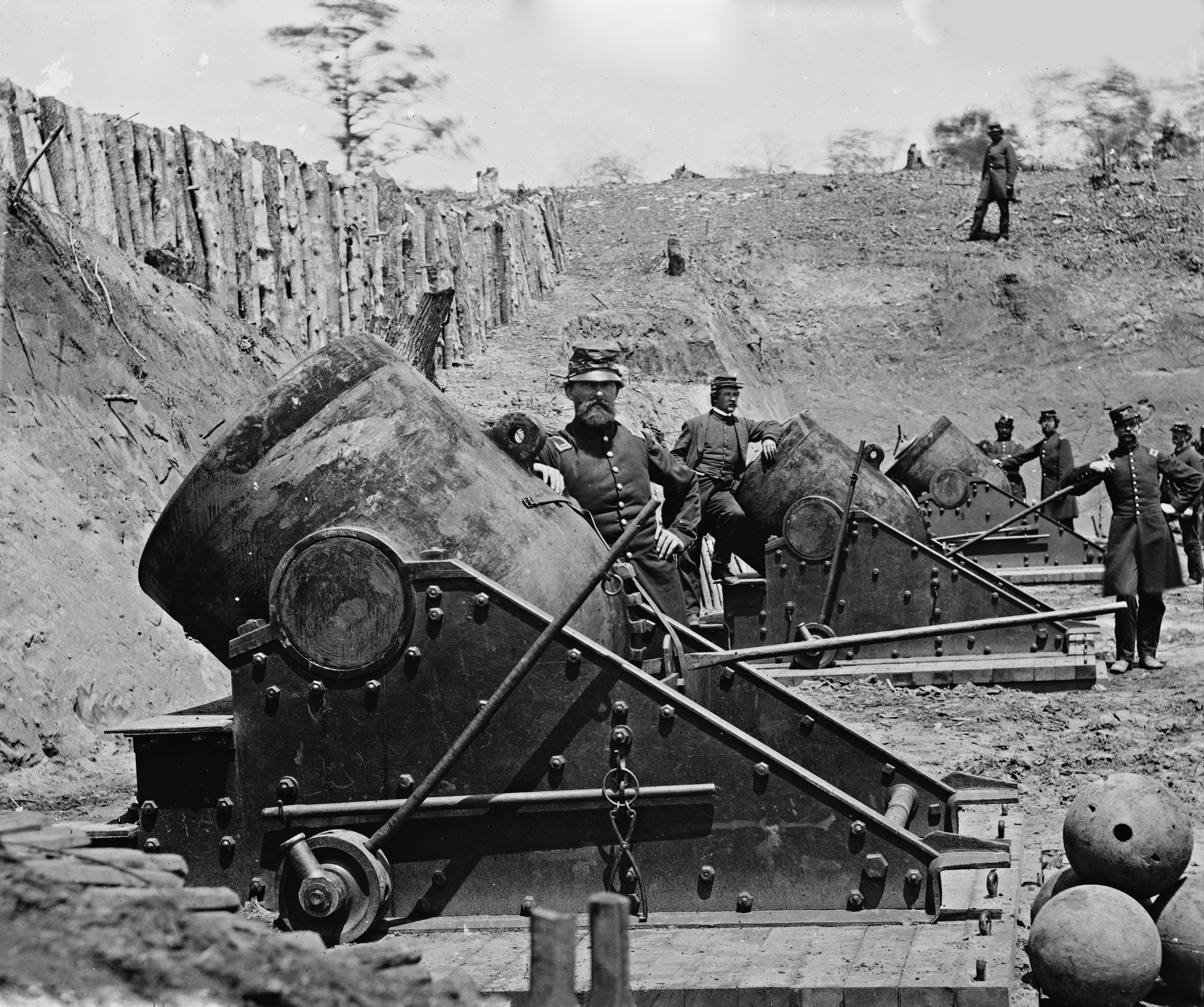
Federal battery with 13-inch seacoast mortars, Model 1861, during the Siege of Yorktown, Virginia (1862).

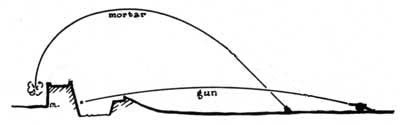
Drawing showing trajectories of gun and mortar fire

Siege artillery is heavy artillery primarily used in military attacks on fortified positions. At the time of the American Civil War, the U.S. Army classified its artillery into three types, depending on the gun's weight and intended use. Field artillery were light pieces that often traveled with the armies. Siege and garrison artillery were heavy pieces that could be used either in attacking or defending fortified places. Seacoast artillery were the heaviest pieces and were intended to be used in permanent fortifications along the seaboard. They were primarily designed to fire on attacking warships (Gibbon 1863, p. 54). The distinctions are somewhat arbitrary, as field, siege and garrison, and seacoast artillery were all used in various attacks and defenses of fortifications. This article will focus on the use of heavy artillery in the attack of fortified places during the American Civil War.

The weight and size of siege artillery prevented it from regularly travelling with the armies. When needed, siege artillery and other material needed for siege operations were assembled into what was called a siege train and transported to the army. In the American Civil War, the siege train was always transported to the area of the siege by water.

The siege trains of the Civil War consisted almost exclusively of guns and mortars. Guns fired projectiles on horizontal trajectory and could batter heavy construction with solid shot or shell at long or short range, destroy fort parapets, and dismount cannon. Mortars fired shells in a high arcing trajectory to reach targets behind obstructions, destroying construction and personnel.

== Pre-war siege artillery ==
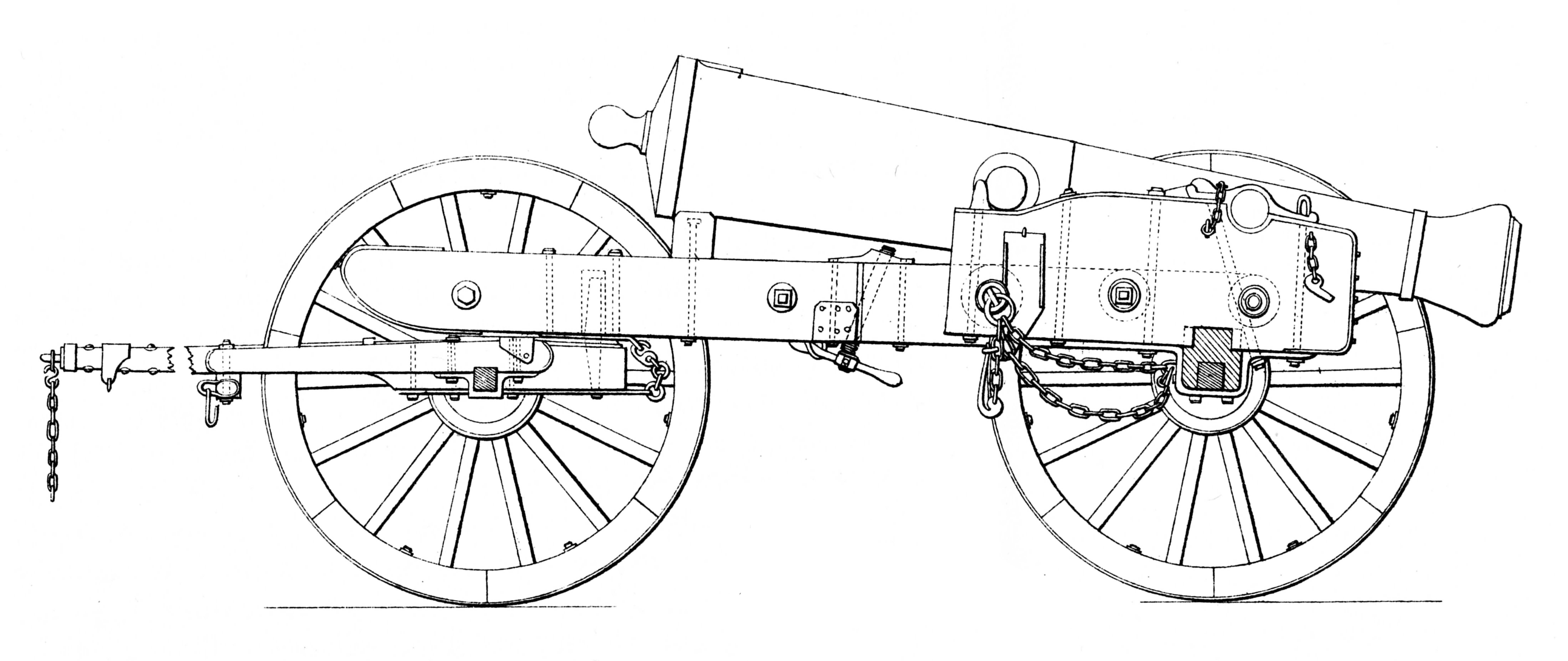
Model 1839 siege gun in travelling position with limber.

Prior to the war, the U.S. Army had a variety of iron smoothbore siege guns (12-pounders, 18-pounders and 24-pounders) and howitzers (24-pounder and 8-inch) (Gibbon 1863, pp. 54–59). None of these pieces were used during the war as siege artillery. The advent of rifled artillery made them obsolete.

== Federal siege train ==
=== Mortars ===
Three primary types of mortars were used during the war: siege & garrison (light), seacoast (heavy) and Coehorns are also classified as siege & garrison. (Ripley 1984, pp. 60–61) While guns were intended to batter down the walls of a fortification during a siege, mortars were designed to fire explosive shells over the walls of the fortification, killing the men inside, and forcing others to stay in bombproof shelters, or preventing the gunners from serving their guns and repairing damage caused by the bombardment. Mortars could also destroy structures inside the fortification such as barracks and kitchens which would normally stay unharmed from standard guns. Heavier mortar shells could penetrate magazines and many bombproof shelters.

In defense of fortifications, siege and garrison mortars could harass work parties constructing siege batteries and trenches. Their fire could also suppress hostile siege batteries. Seacoast mortars could penetrate the decks of wooden ships and even threaten the deck plating of ironclad vessels. (Ripley 1984, pp. 58–59) Lastly, these could also kill men where other guns couldn't reach them

The 8-inch and 10-inch siege mortars had maximum ranges of 2,225 and 2,064 yards, respectively, (Abbot 1867, pp. 39–40) and the 13-inch seacoast mortar had a maximum range of 4,300 yards, but their effective ranges were much shorter. For the 8-inch siege mortar at a range of 800 yards, about 50% of the shells would fall within a 50-yard radius of the target. With the 10-inch siege mortars at 875 yards, about 60% of the shells would fall within a 40-yard radius of the target. The 13-inch seacoast mortar could be expected to be more accurate. (Abbot 1867, p. 39)

Coehorn mortars were lighter mortars, designed to be brought well forward in the trenches.

With the replacement of masonry fortifications with earthen works, mortars became more important. Works that could resist the horizontal fire of guns were still vulnerable to the vertical fire of mortars.

Name	Weight of shell	Weight of mortar	weight of bed
Coehorn mortar M. 1841 (5.82-inch)	17 lb.	164 lb.	132 lb.
8-inch siege mortar M.1841	44 lb.	930 lb.	920 lb.
10-inch siege mortar M. 1841	88 lb.	1,852 lb.	1,830 lb.
10-inch seacoast mortar M. 1841	88 lb.	5,775 lb.	---
13-inch seacoast mortar M. 1861	197 lb.	17,120 lb.	---

==== Wooden mortars ====
The Union Army of the Tennessee, not having a proper siege train at the siege of Vicksburg, was forced to improvise. The artillerymen took short sections of gum-tree logs, bored them out to accept six or twelve pound shells, and hooped the logs with iron bands. These wooden mortars reportedly served well (Hickenlooper 1888, p. 540). Edward Porter Alexander reported that Confederate experiments with wooden mortars were not successful (Alexander 1883, p. 110).

==== Mortar gallery ====
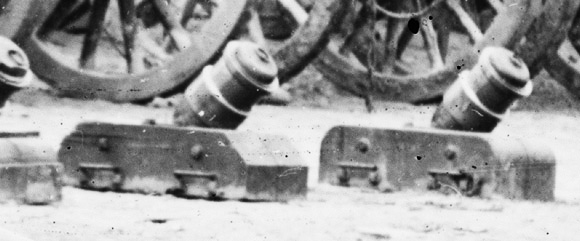
Coehorn mortars, Model 1841.

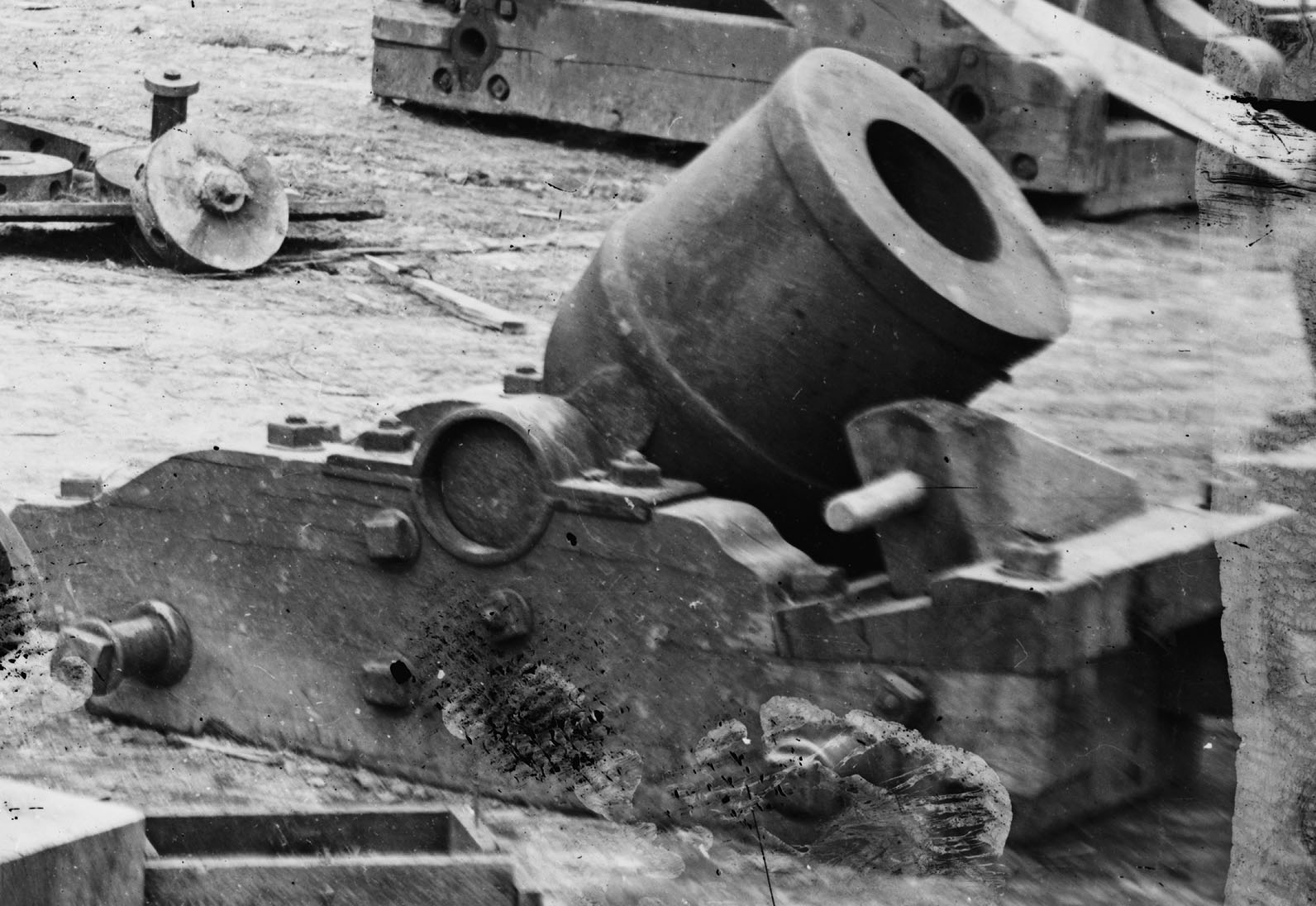
8-inch siege mortar, Model 1841.

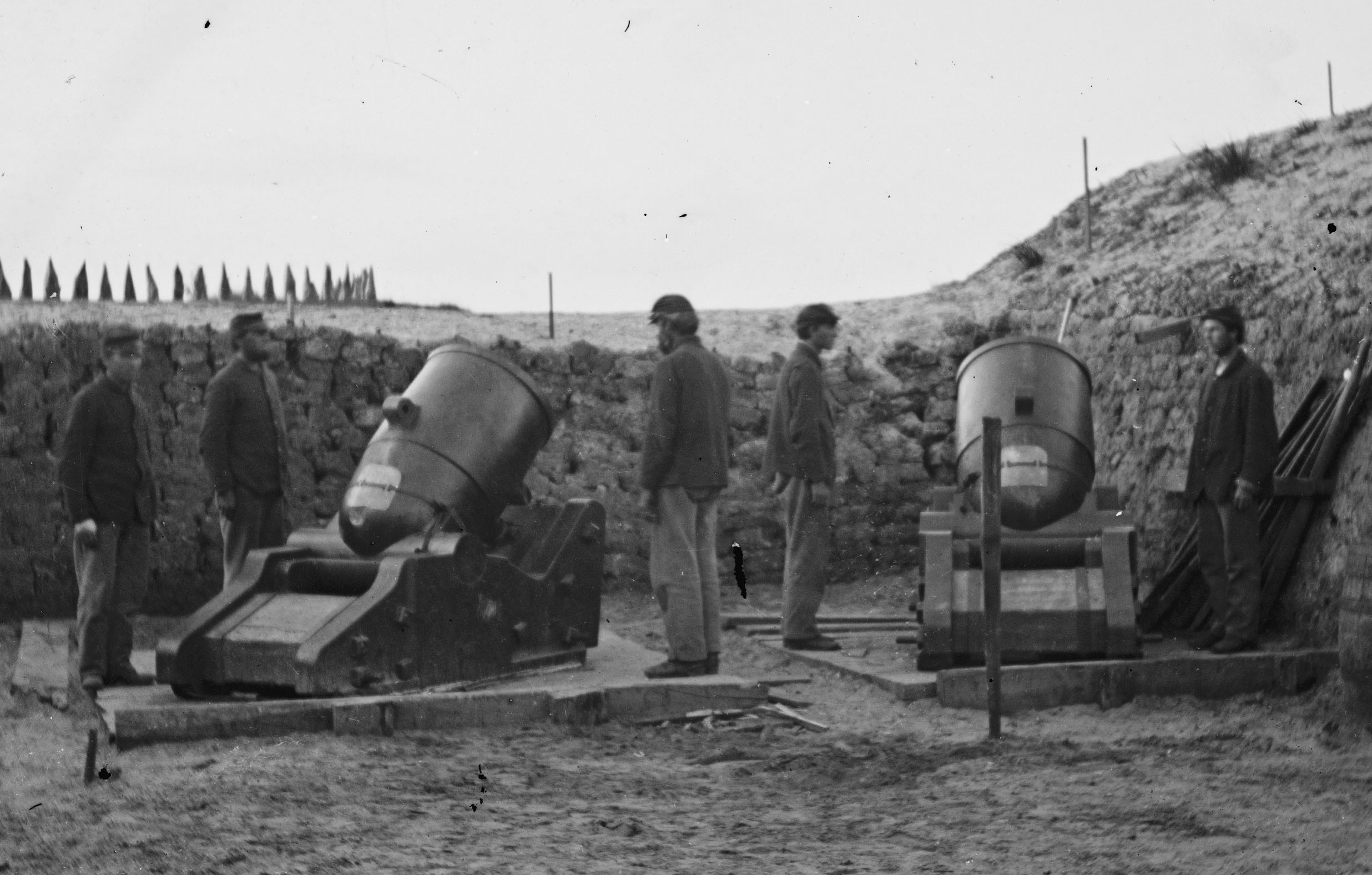
Federal battery with 10 inch seacoast mortars, Model 1841, on Morris Island, during the siege of campaign against Charleston harbor.

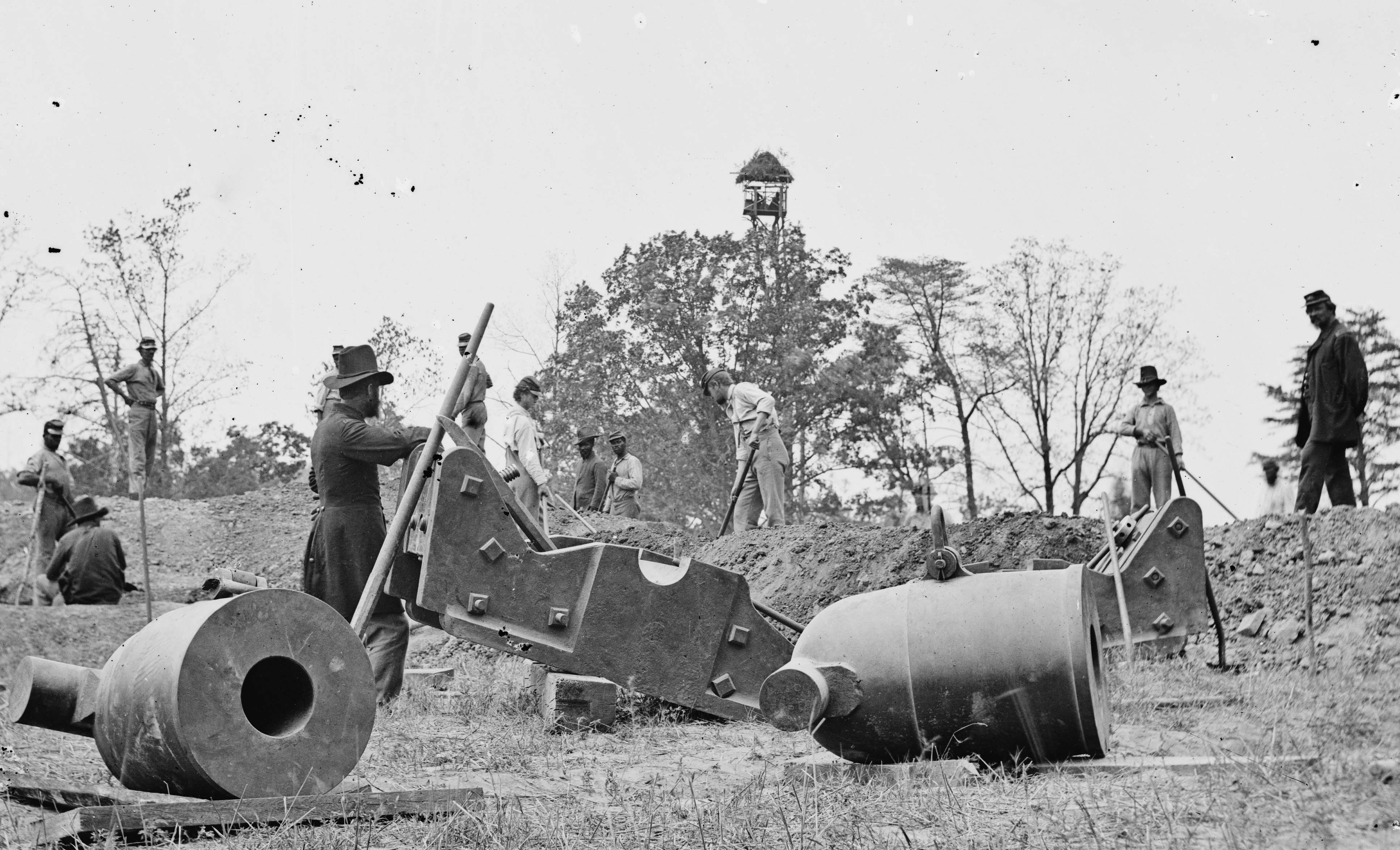
10-inch seacoast mortars, Model 1841, being emplaced near Butler's Crows Nest near Dutch Gap, Virginia.

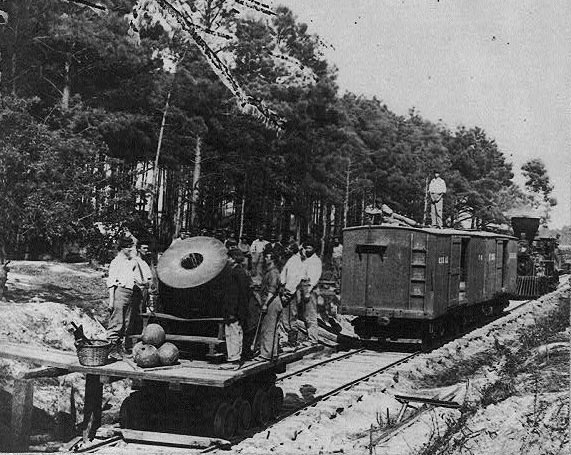
13-inch seacoast mortar, Model 1861, "The Dictator" on railroad cars during the siege of Petersburg.

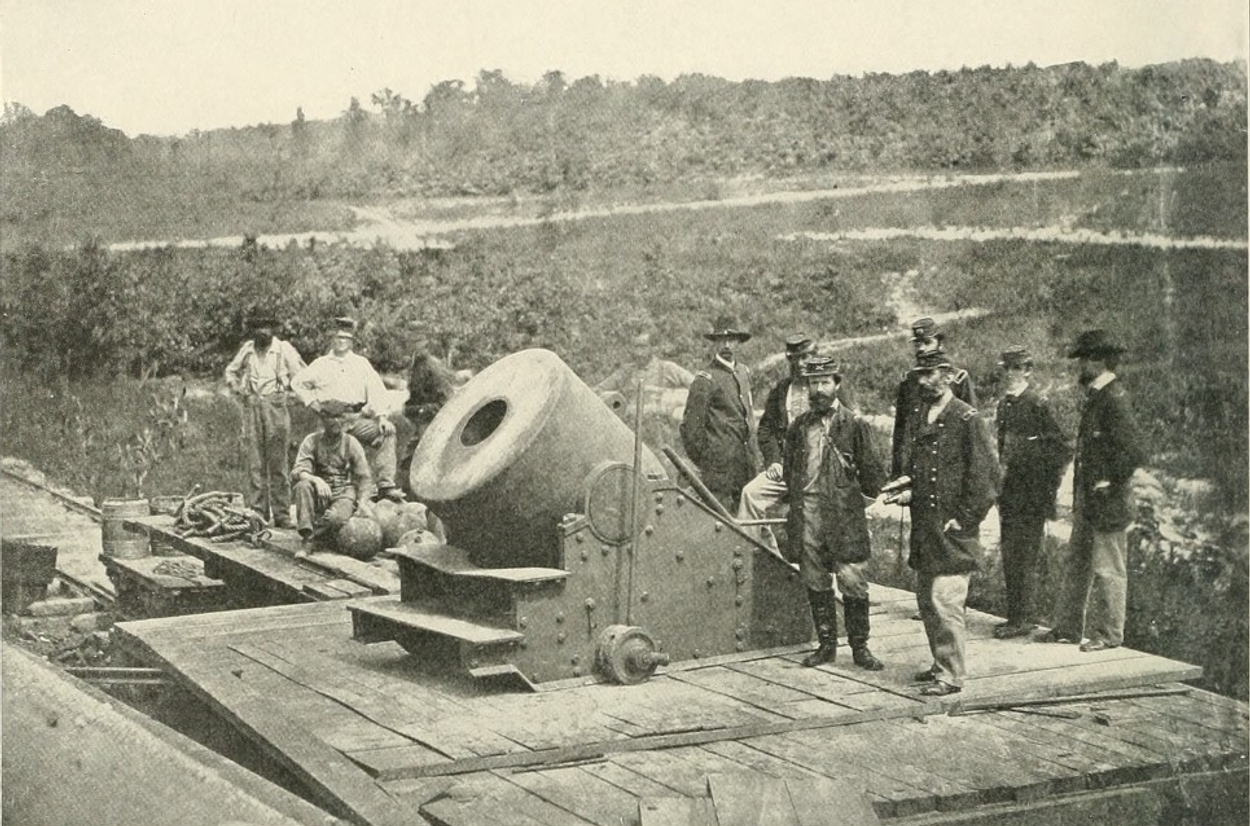
the figure in the foreground is Brig. Gen. Henry J. Hunt, chief of artillery of the Army of the Potomac.

=== Rifled artillery ===
The Civil War was the first major war to see the use of rifled artillery. Rifling gave the guns greater velocity, range, accuracy, and penetrating power, making smoothbore siege guns obsolete. The ranges of these guns is somewhat problematic. The 6.4 inch (100-pounder) Parrott rifle had a maximum range of 8,845 yards (5 mi; 8 km) (Parrott 1863, p. 5). However, the absence of suitable sights (Abbot 1867, pp. 89–90) and a good system of directing fire on targets that could not be seen from the gun, limited the effective range of the rifled guns.

The bombardment of Fort Pulaski demonstrated that rifled guns were extremely effective against masonry fortifications. The reduction of Fort Macon two weeks later confirmed this. Later experiences at the campaign against Charleston Harbor and the siege of Petersburg showed that rifled guns are much less effective against earthen field works.

==== 4.5-inch siege rifle ====
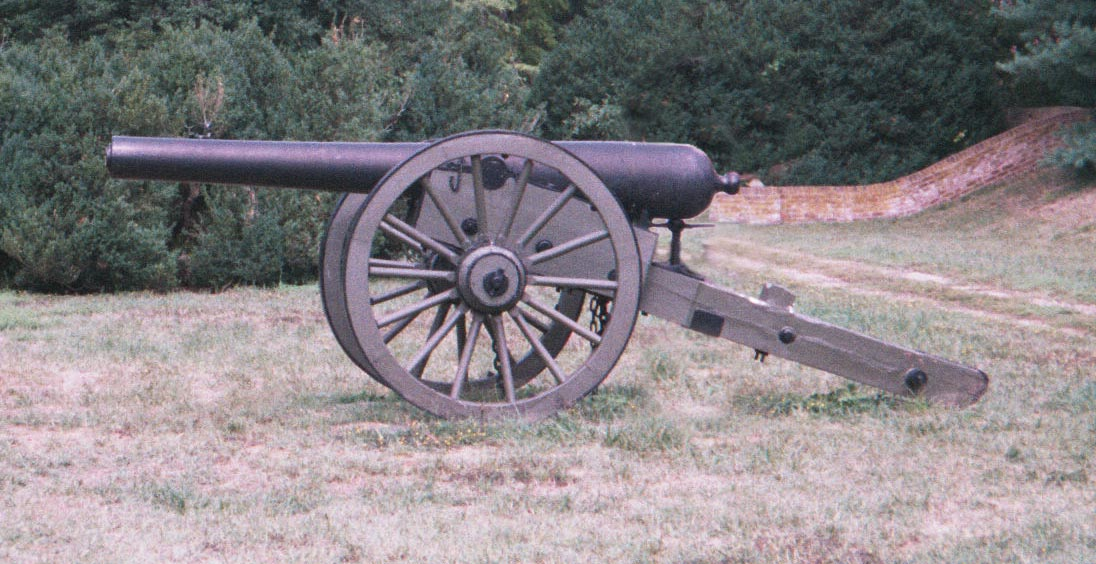
4.5-inch siege rifle at Chatham Manor, Fredericksburg and Spotsylvania National Military Park.

The 4.5-inch siege rifle looks like a larger version of the 3-inch ordnance rifle and it is often called a 4.5-inch ordnance rifle. However, the 4.5-inch siege rifle was of conventional cast iron construction and did not use the welded wrought iron construction of the 3-inch ordnance rifle. The 4.5-inch siege rifle fired shells weighing about 30 pounds (depending on the specific type of shell). The tube weighed 3,450 pounds and was 133 inches long. The gun's only vice was that it suffered from excessive erosion of the vent caused by the hot gasses flowing through the vent when the gun was fired. The vent could become too large to fire the piece after 400 discharges.(Abbot 1867, p. 89) This problem could be remedied by insertion of a copper vent piece (bouche).

In addition to its use as siege artillery, two batteries of 4.5-inch siege rifles (8 guns total) accompanied the Army of the Potomac as "heavy" field artillery between 1862 and 1864. The big guns were intended for long range firing against Confederate artillery. Although the guns showed very good mobility, they saw little action.(Abbot 1867, pp. 149–155)

==== James rifles ====
During the early part of the war, the Federal army lacked rifled siege artillery. To fill this gap, the army rifled existing smoothbore pieces with the system developed by Charles T. James. Firing shot and shells also designed by James, these newly rifled smoothbores gave good service during the bombardment of Fort Pulaski in April 1862. However they were retired from frontline service soon after.

Smoothbore artillery rifled with the James system

Name	Bore	Weight of projectile	Weight of gun	Length of gun
24-pdr M. 1839, rifled (48-pdr James rifle)	5.82 in.	48 lb. (shot)	5,790 lb.	124 in.
32-pdr M. 1829, rifled (64-pdr James rifle)	6.4 in.	64 lb. (shot)	7,531 lb.	125 in.
42-pdr M. 1841 rifle (84-pdr James rifle)	7 in.	64 lb. (shell): 81 lb (36.7 kg); (shot)	8,465 lb.	129 in.

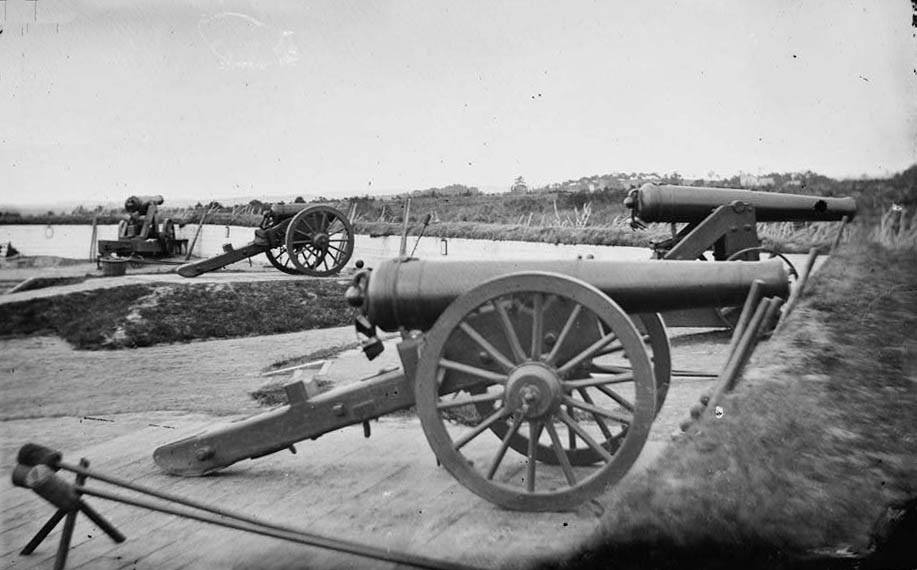
Two Model 1829 32-pounder siege and garrison guns, rifled by the James method (64-pdr James rifles). The one in the foreground is on a siege carriage. The one behind is on an iron, front pintle, barbette carriage.

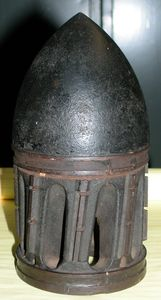
A James pattern solid shot. The "birdcage" at the base would have been covered by sheet lead which, upon firing the gun, would have expanded into the grooves of the rifling.

==== Parrott rifles ====
Robert Parker Parrott (1804–77), an 1824 graduate of the United States Military Academy, developed a new form of rifled artillery using a cast iron barrel with a reinforcing wrought iron band around the breech. He first produced 2.9-inch (10-pounder) and 3.67-inch (20-pounder) rifles for the field artillery. He later produced four larger rifled guns that were used as siege artillery. These heavy Parrott rifles became the mainstays of the Federal siege train.

Name	Weight of projectile	Weight of gun	Length of gun	Range
4.2 inch Parrott rifle (30-pdr Parrott rifle)	25 lb. (shell)	4,200 lb.	132 in.	6,700 yd. @ 25°
6.4-inch Parrott rifle (100-pdr Parrott rifle)	90 lb. (shell)	9,700 lb.	155 in.	8,845 yd. @ 35°
8-inch Parrott rifle (200-pdr Parrott rifle)	150 lb. (shell)	16,500 lb.	162 in.	8000 yd. @35°
10-inch Parrott rifle (300-pdr Parott rifle)	250 lb. (shell)	26,500 lb.	177 in.	---

===== 4.2-inch (30-pounder) Parrott rifle =====
The 4.2-inch (30-pounder) rifles were the most widely used of the Parrott siege guns. The tubes were mounted on a conventional siege carriage. The early pattern guns had the elevating screw under the breech, while the newer pattern gun had a long screw running through the cascabel. The long elevating screws of the newer models were prone to breakage (Abbot 1867, p. 90). The 4.2-inch Parrott rifles were preferred over the 4.5-inch siege rifles because of the superiority of Parrott shells over the various shells available for the 4.5-inch siege rifle. The 4.2-inch Parrott rifles did not have as great a propensity for bursting as found in the larger Parrott rifles. During the siege of Petersburg 44 4.2-inch Parrott rifles fired 12,209 rounds (Abbot 1867, pp. 160–170), but only one gun burst when a shell detonated before clearing the muzzle (Abbot 1867, p. 87). One 4.2-inch Parrott rifle also burst during the campaign against Charleston harbor, but only after it had fired 4,606 rounds (Abbot 1867, p. 87).

Two new examples of a Confederate-made variant of a 30-pounder Parrott were also employed in defensive positions at the Battle of Fredericksburg. Both pieces burst in action there, one on the 39th and the other on the 54th discharge. (Dew, p. 187)

===== 6.4-inch (100-pounder) Parrott rifle =====
The 6.4-inch (100-pounder) Parrott Rifle was a potent siege gun capable of great accuracy and long range with heavy projectiles. For siege use it was mounted on a front pintle barbette carriage. It did, however, tend to burst. Of the three hundred 6.4-inch Parrott rifles in service with the U.S. Navy, 19 burst (Ripley 1984, p. 117). During the campaign against Charleston harbor, one burst at 122 rounds and another burst at 1,151 rounds (Gilmore 1890, p. 32). The army retained their enthusiasm for the guns. General Quincy A. Gilmore, commander of the Federal forces at Charleston, said "[t]here is, perhaps, no better system of rifled cannon than Parrotts; certainly none more simple in construction, more easily understood, or that can with more safety be placed in the hands of inexperienced men for use." (Gilmore 1890, p. 31). A 100-pounder was also fired from Fort DeRussy during the Battle of Fort Stevens in Washington, DC.

===== 8-inch (200-pounder) Parrott rifle =====
The 8-inch (200-pounder) Parrott Rifle was essentially an enlarged 6.4-inch Parrott rifle with the same vices and virtues. The most famous 8-inch Parrott rifle was the "Swamp Angel" used for the bombardment of the city of Charleston. It burst on its 36th discharge.

===== 10-inch (300-pounder) Parrott rifle =====
Only three 10-inch (300-pounder) Parrotts saw service during the war; all placed on Morris Island during the campaign against Charleston harbor. It was mounted on a center pintle, barbette carriage. It was essentially an enlarged 8-inch Parrott rifle, although it was believed to be somewhat more accurate than the 8-inch rifle (Turner 1890, p. 222). One 10-inch Parrott rifle on Morris Island was disabled soon after it first opened fire by the premature detonation of a shell, which blew about 18 inches off its muzzle. The ragged end of the muzzle was trimmed even by soldiers working with cold chisels, and the gun fired another 370 times without any appreciable difference in range or accuracy. The gun was subsequently permanently disabled by additional premature detonation of shells.

===== Parrott rifle gallery =====
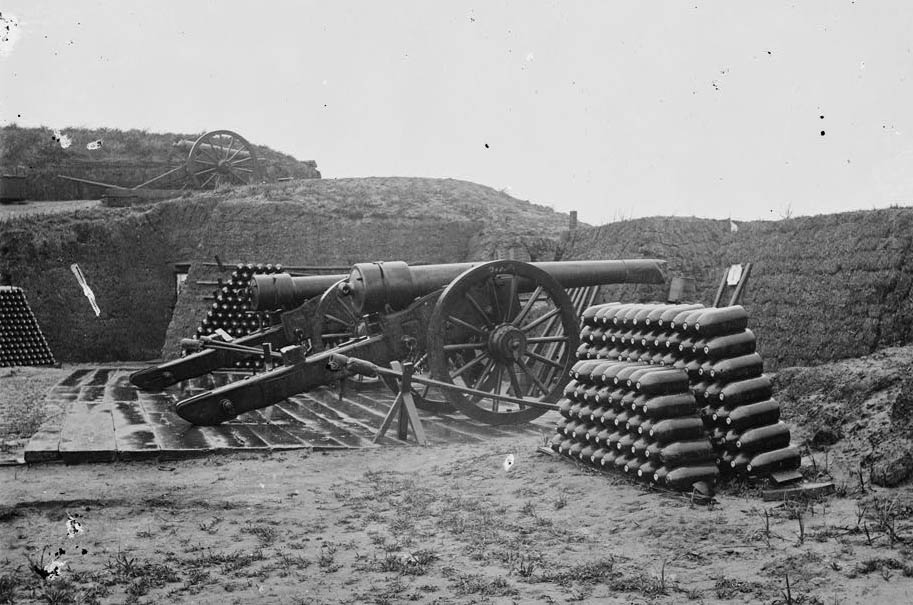
Two 4.2-inch (30-pounder) Parrott rifles and stacks of shells inside Fort Putnam on Morris Island during the campaign against Charleston harbor.

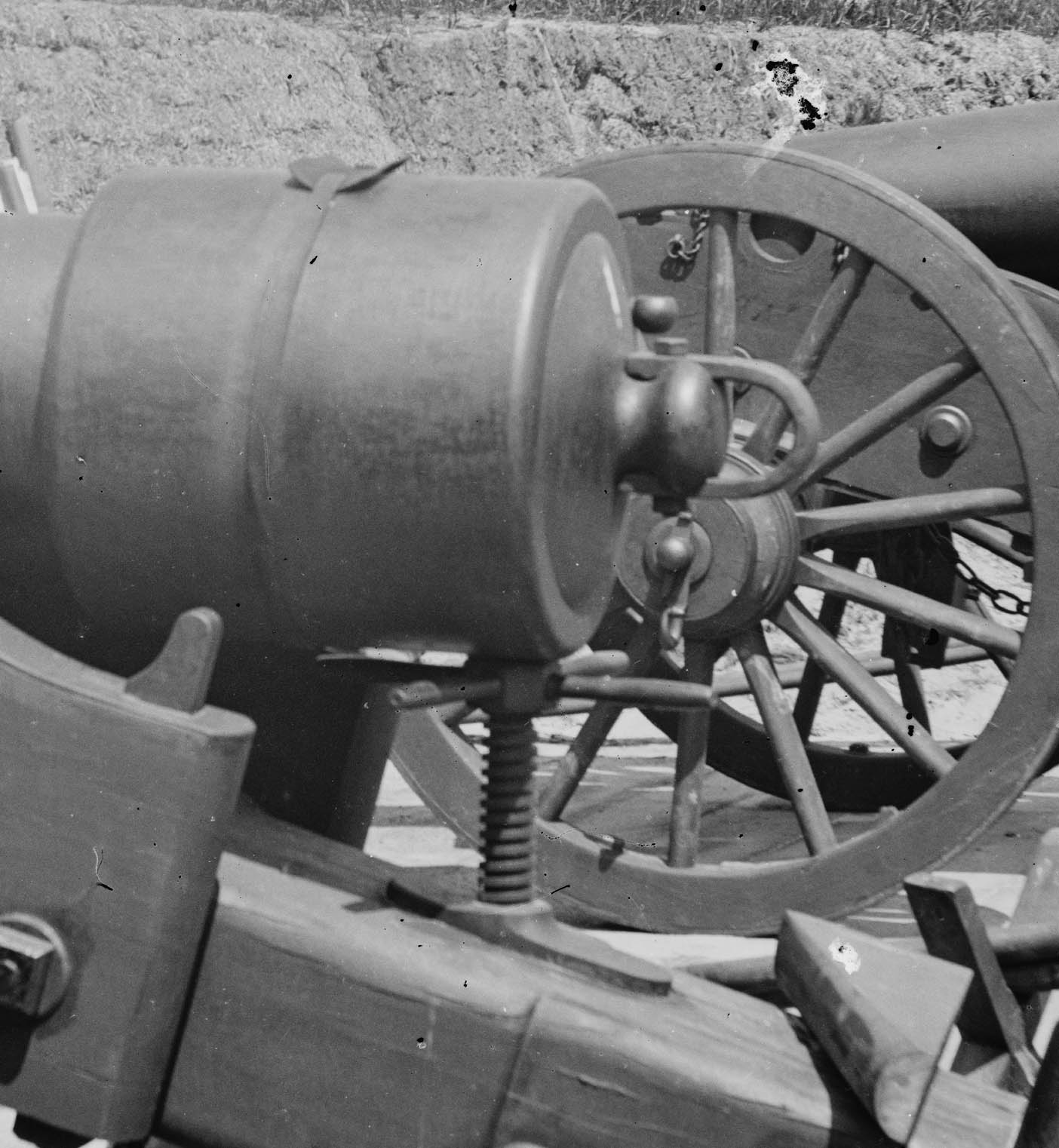
Older model 4.2-inch Parrott rifle with breech resting on elevating screw. Shackle on cascabel may indicate gun was originally intended for naval use.

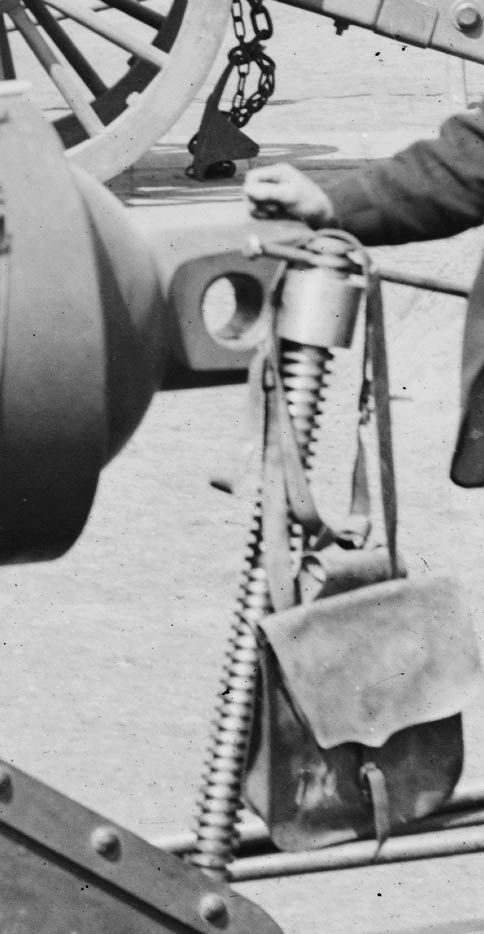
Photograph of 6.4-inch Parrott rifle showing elevating screw running through cascabel. This is the same design used in newer model 4.2-inch Parrott rifles.

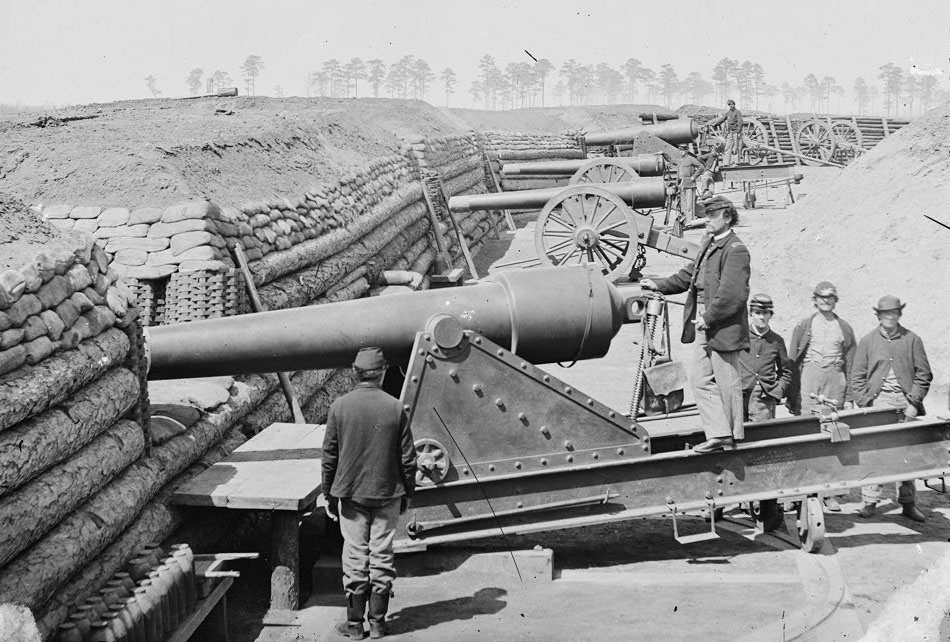
Two 6.4-inch (100-pounder) and two 4.2-inch Parrott rifles inside Fort Brady during the siege of Petersburg. The 6.4-inch rifles are on iron, front pintle, barbette carriages and the 4.2-inch rifles are on siege carriages.

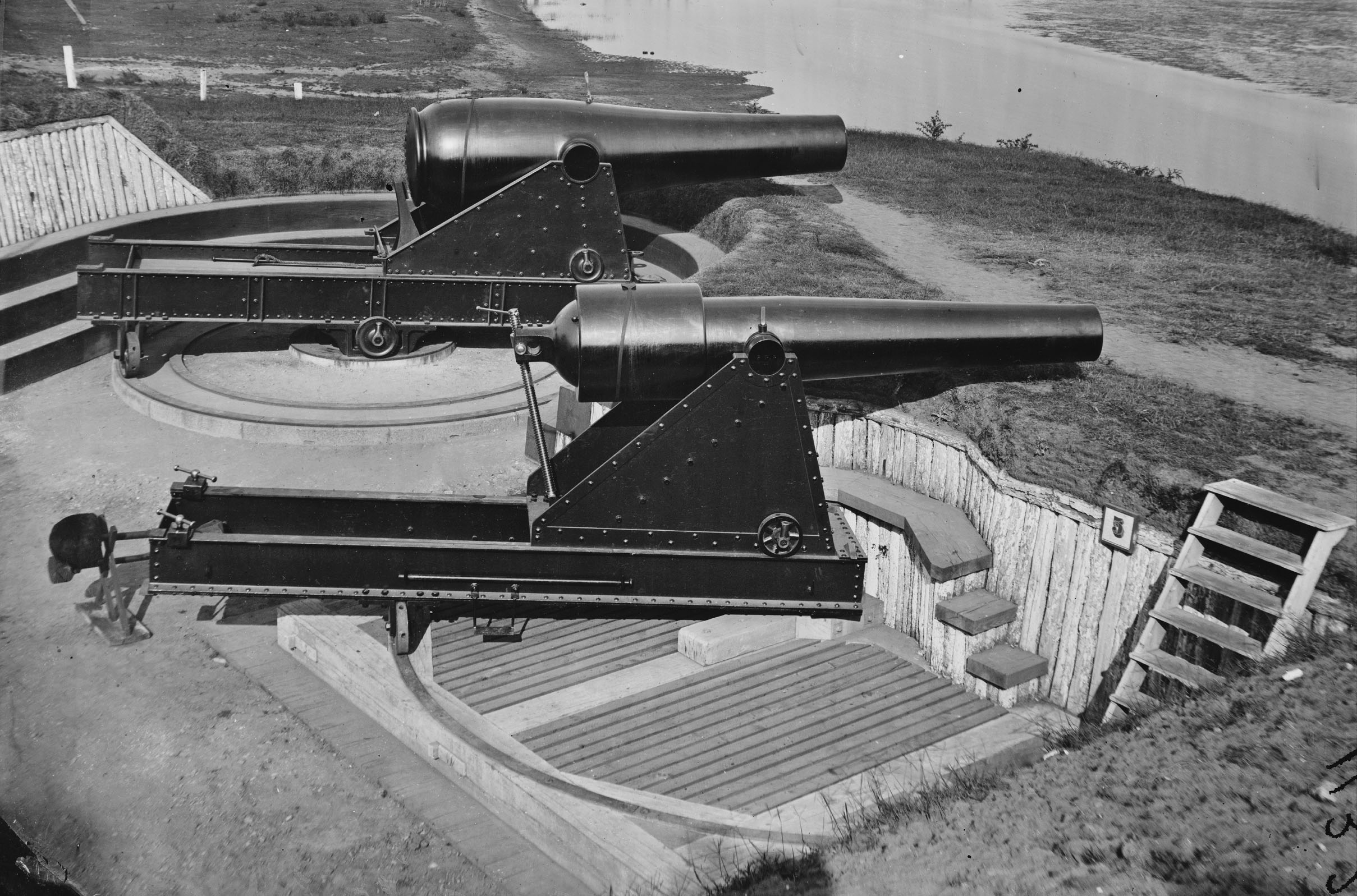
An 8-inch (200-pounder) Parrott rifle at Battery Rodgers Alexandria, Virginia mounted on a front pintle, barbette carriage. The gun in the background is a Rodman gun mounted on a center pintle, barbette carriage.

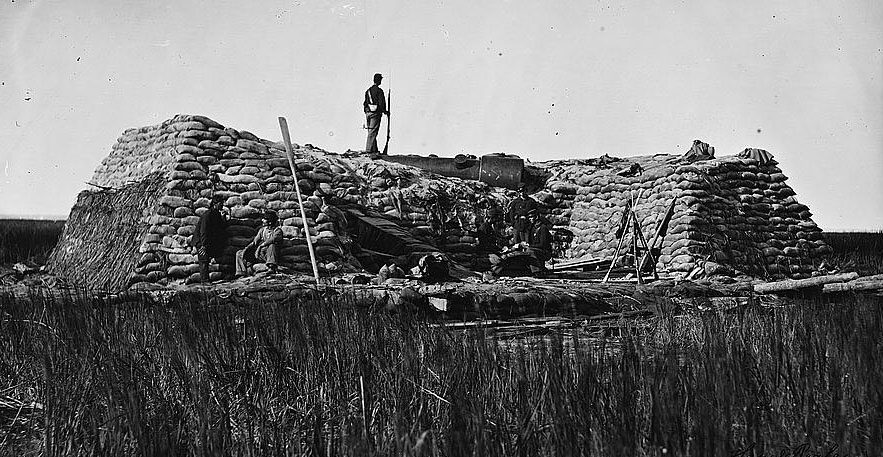
8-inch Parrott rifle "Swamp Angel" thrown forward on parapet after busting.

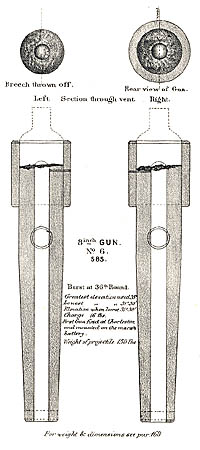
Engraving showing damage to 8-inch Parrott Rifle "Swamp Angel."

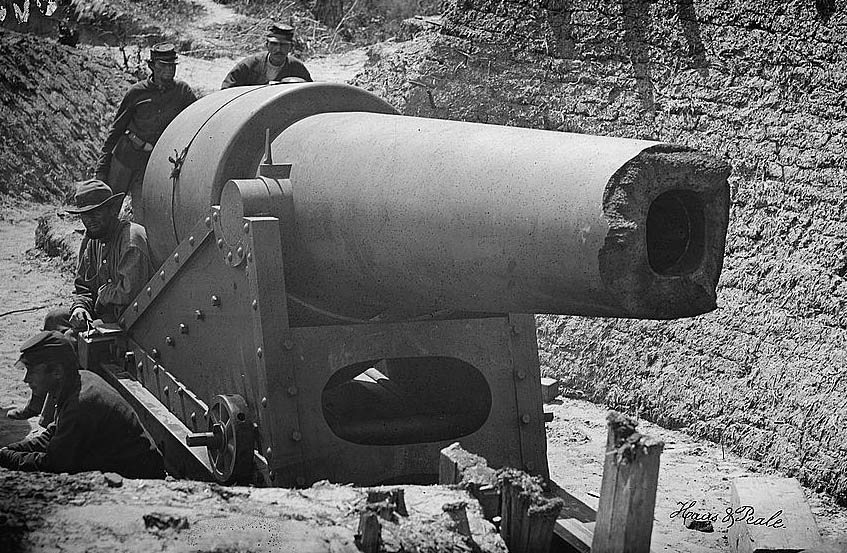
A 10-inch (300-pounder) Parrott Rifle on Morris Island that burst in the campaign against Charleston harbor. The front sight for the gun is visible on the trunnion.

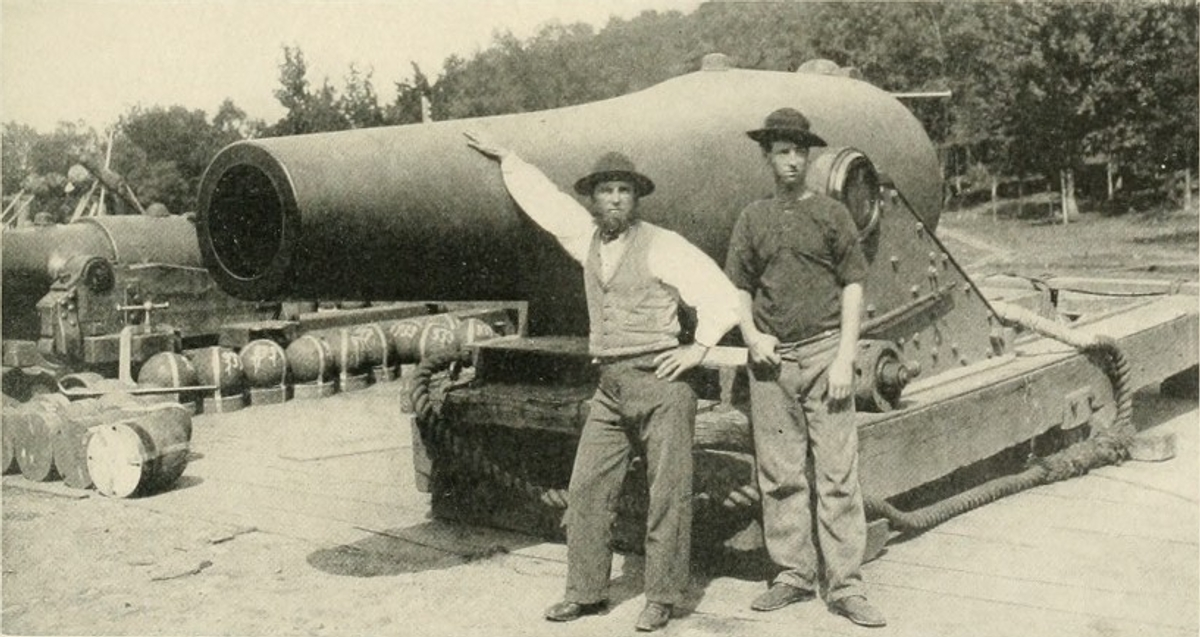
15-inch Rodman gun at Battery Rodgers, Alexandria, Virginia, mounted to defend the Potomac River as part of the Defenses of Washington. An 8-inch Parrott rifle is visible in the background.

==== Whitworth rifle ====
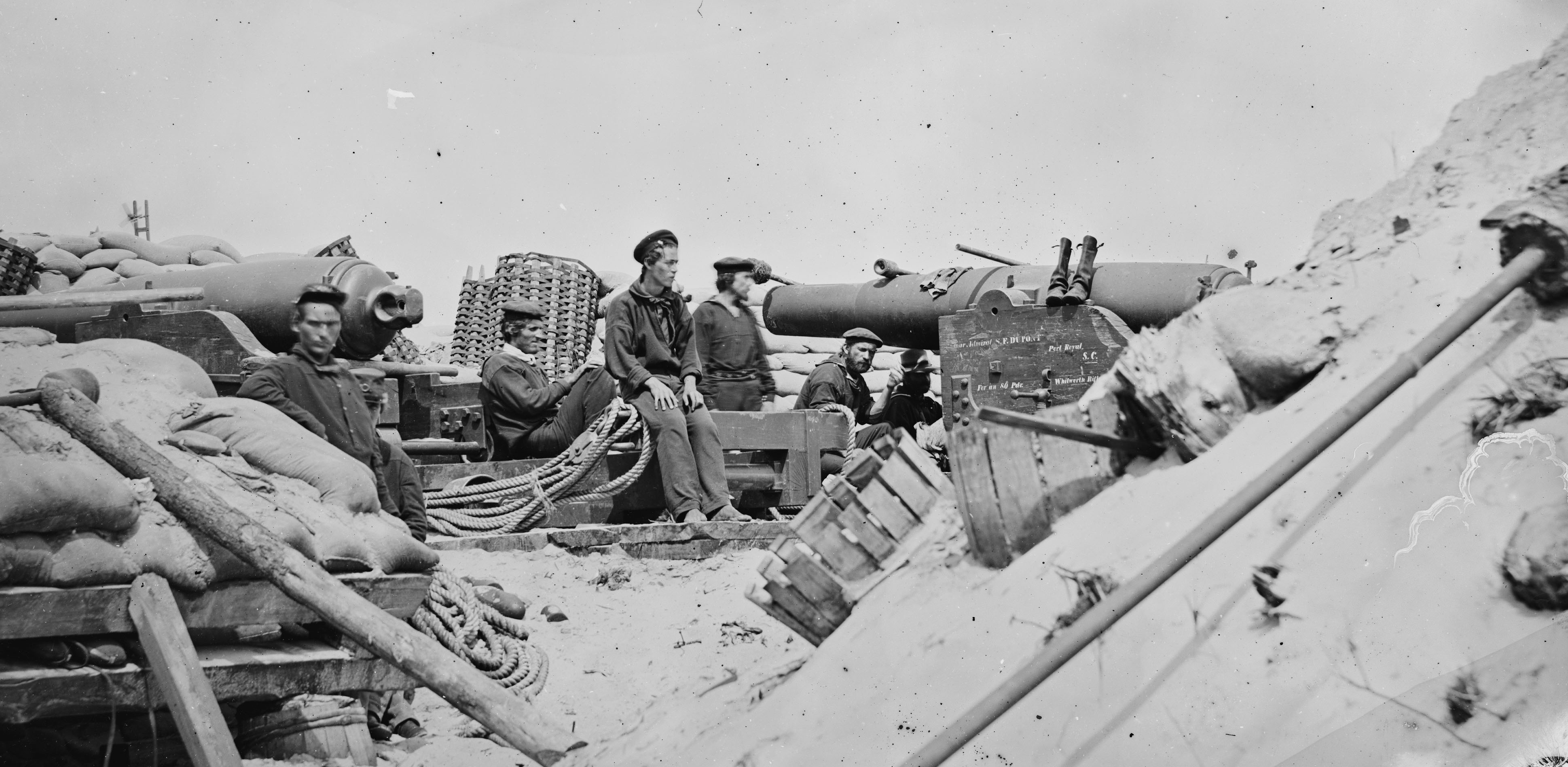
Battery of 5-inch Whitworth rifles on Morris Island during campaign against Charleston harbor.

The Federal forces at Charleston used two British 5-inch Whitworth muzzle-loading rifles that had been captured aboard a blockade runner. Served by sailors of the blockading squadron, the guns proved to be entirely unsuccessful. Shells failed to take the rifling, exploded prematurely, and solid shot could not reach their target (Wise 1994, p. 157). They could only be loaded by heavy blows with a handspike (a heavy wooden bar used to move a gun). One of them became disabled when the barrel slipped within the reinforcing sleeve, blocking the vent. This caused the navy to stop using the other Whitworth (Turner 1890, p. 223).

=== Naval guns ===
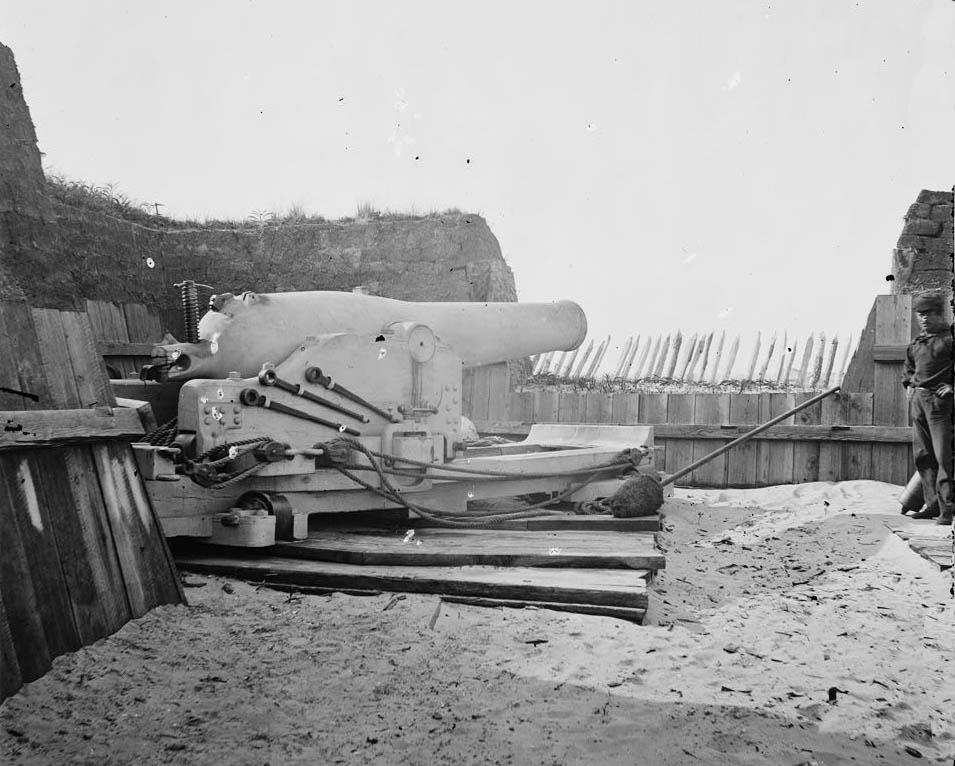
An XI-inch Navy Dahlgren gun emplaced on Morris Island in 1864

The navy has traditionally provided siege artillery to the army when needed. The Civil War was no exception to this rule. Seamen from the USS Wabash manned the Whitworth rifles and two 8-inch Parrott rifles during the campaign against Charleston harbor. Seamen also manned 5 navy XI-inch Dahlgren guns emplaced on Morris Island in 1864. In the siege of Vicksburg, the Federal Army of the Tennessee had no siege artillery, so the U.S. Navy placed at least two of their 8-inch guns into batteries ashore (Hickenlooper 1888, p. 540).

== Confederate siege train ==
The Confederate Army had no siege train per se, as they did not engage in regular sieges. In defending the works that were the objects of Federal siege operations, the Confederates used a hodge-podge of weapons seized from Federal arsenals and fortifications, naval guns, Confederate-made versions of pre-war designs, and imported rifled guns, such as the Whitworth and Armstrong rifles.

The Confederate equivalents to the heavy Parrott rifles were the Brooke rifles, developed by John Mercer Brooke. They were cast iron guns with wrought iron breech bands like the Parrott rifles. They generally had a bore of 6.4 or 7 inches, and had single, double, and even triple bands.

During the siege of Petersburg the Confederate Army developed iron 12-pounder and 24-pounder Coehorn mortars. The rough iron pieces served very well.

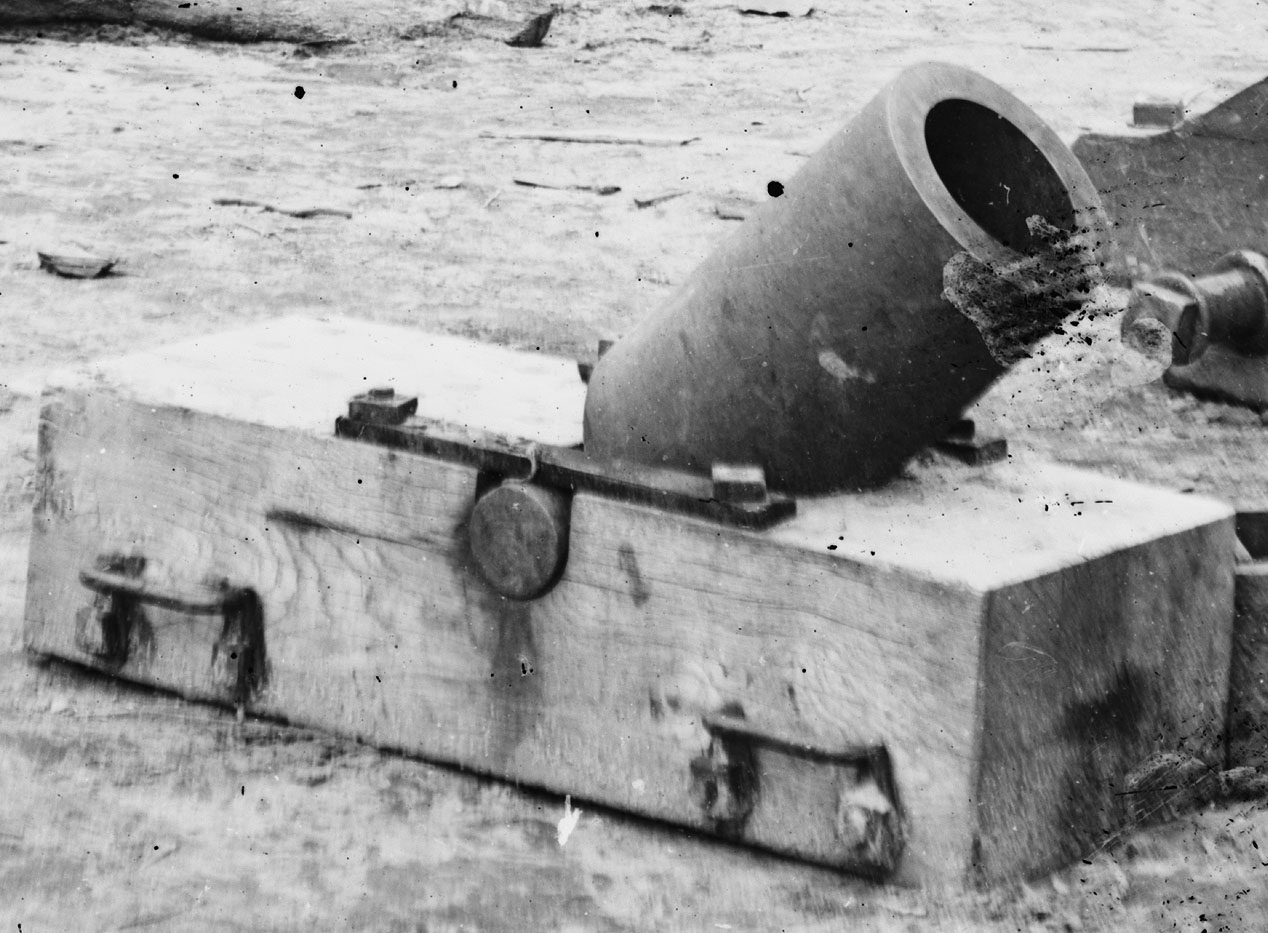
A Confederate iron 24-pounder Coehorn mortar.

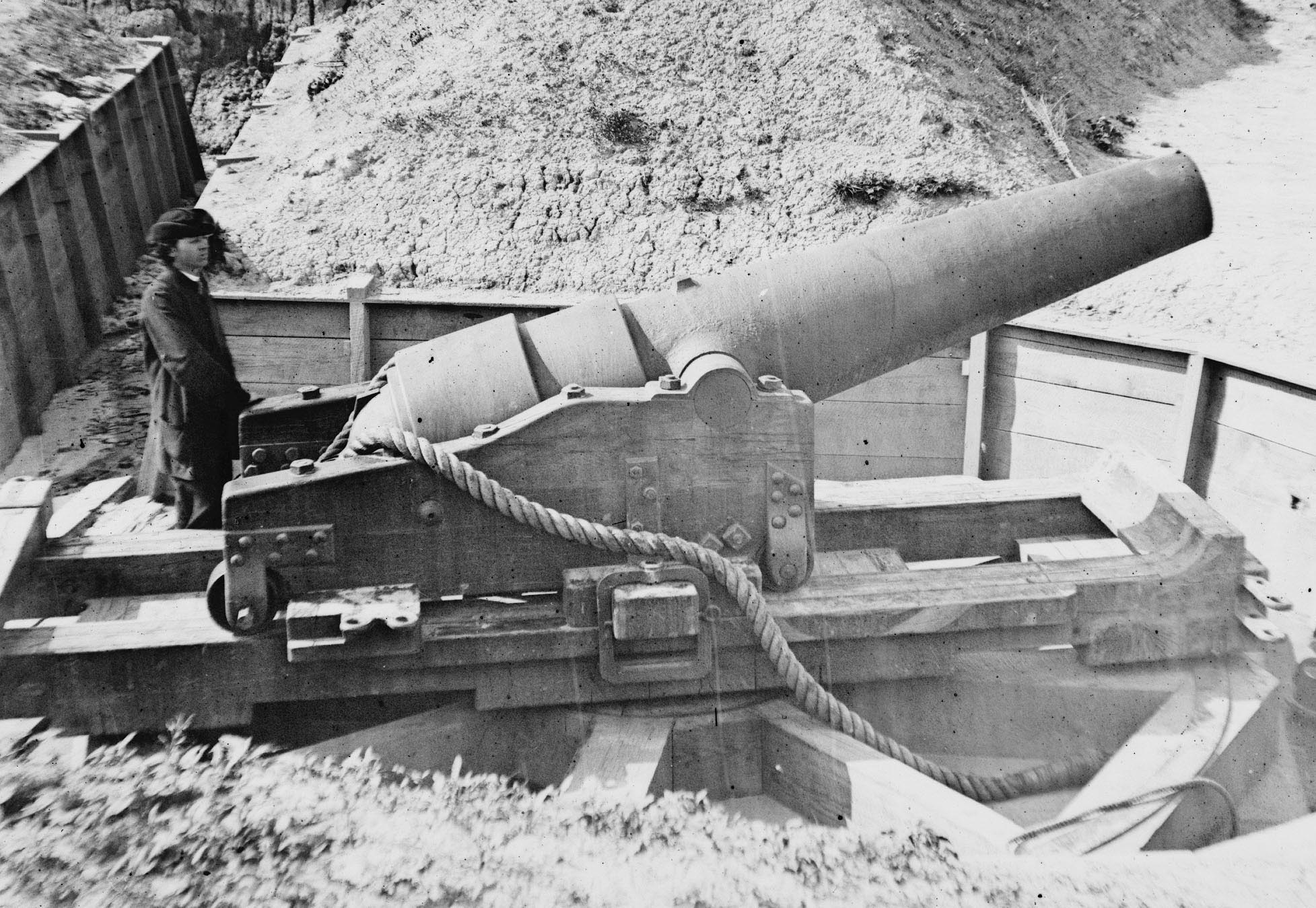
A double-banded Brooke rifle of undetermined caliber.

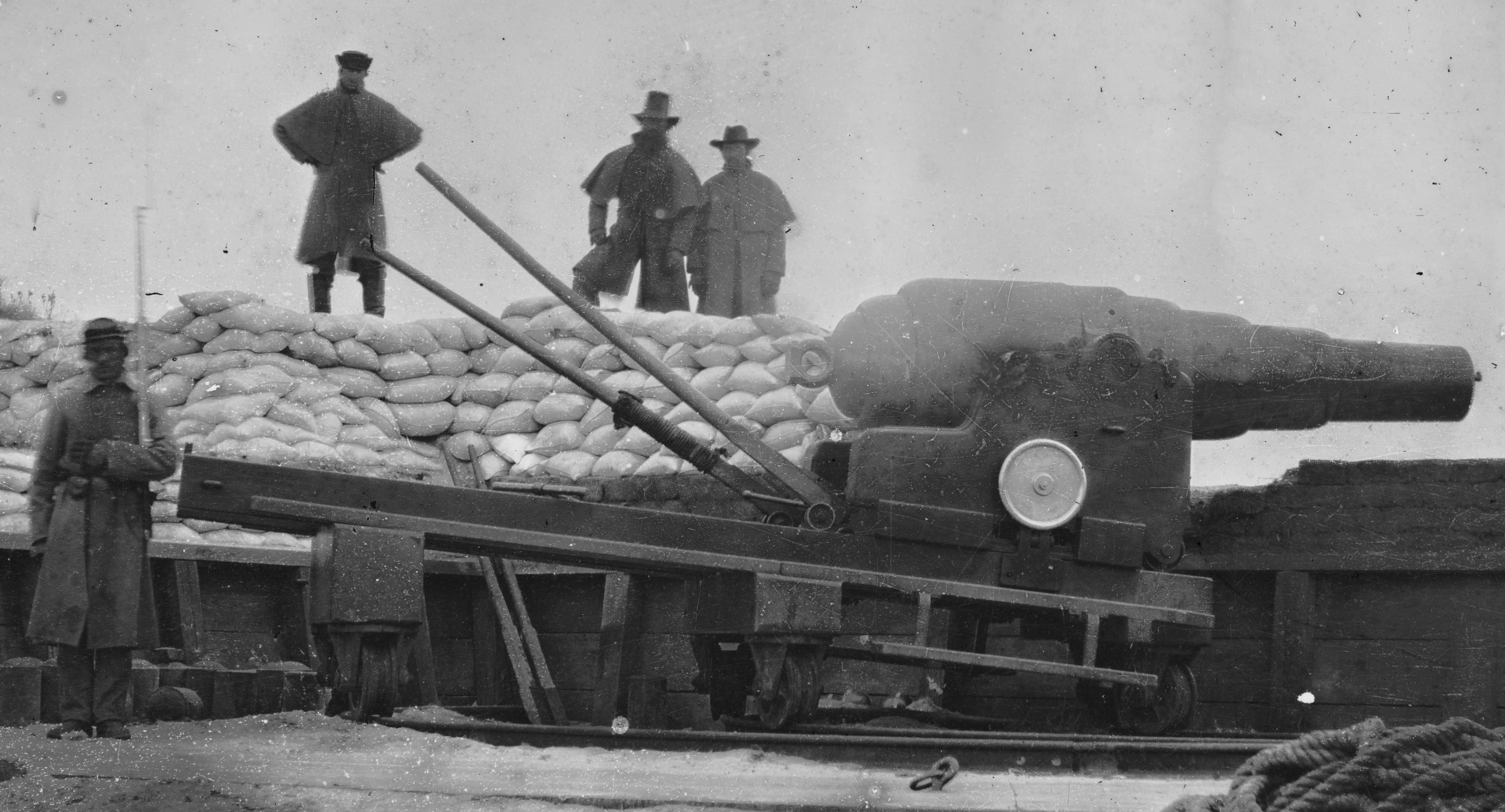
English 8-inch (150-pdr) Armstrong Rifled Muzzle Loader at Fort Fisher, North Carolina.

== Use of siege artillery during the American Civil War ==
=== Bombardment of Fort Pulaski ===
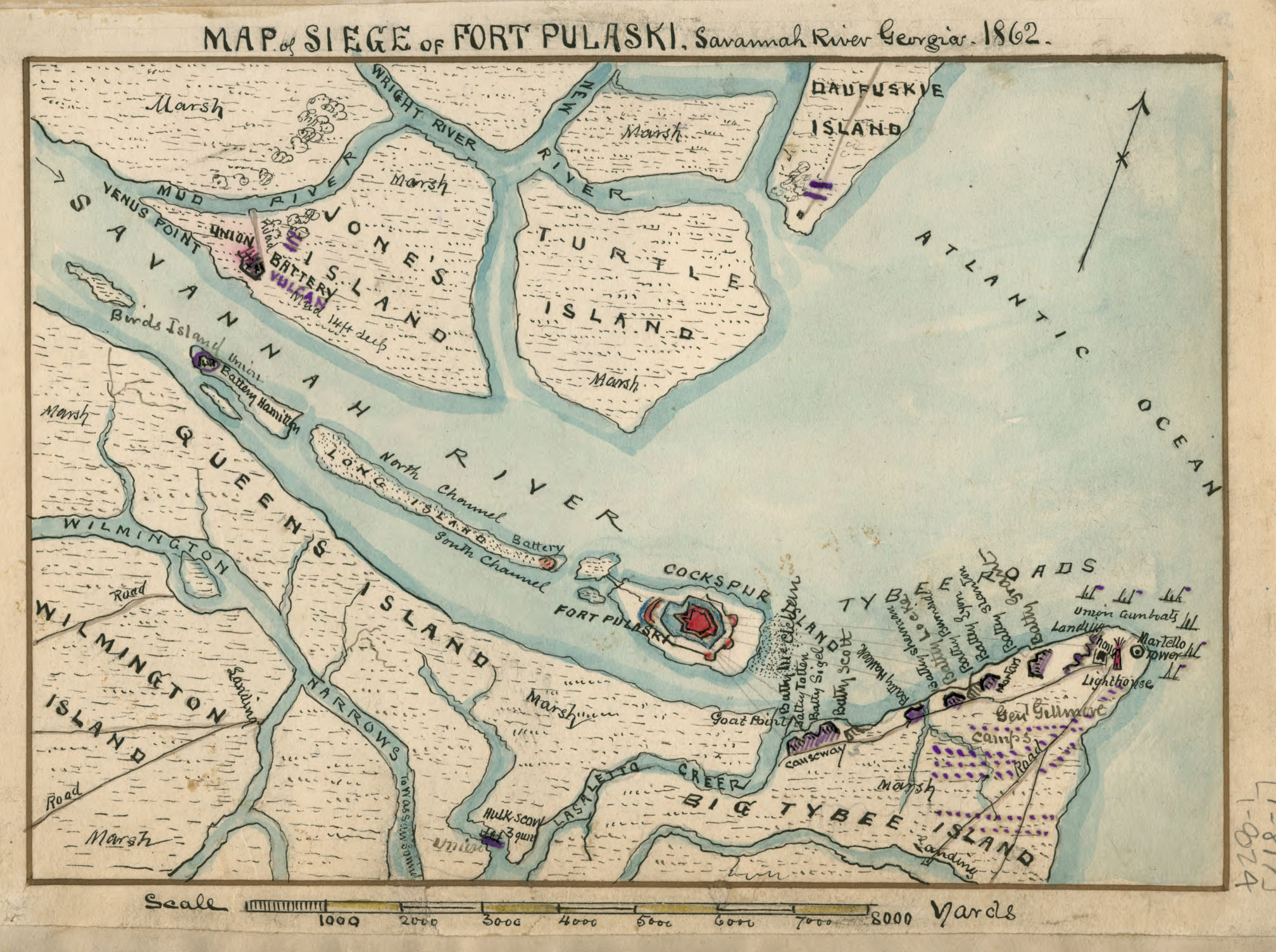
"Map of Siege of Fort Pulaski, Savannah River Georgia, 1862." Period map drawn by Robert K. Sneden.

U.S. Army command decided to block Savannah, Georgia's access to the Atlantic Ocean by capturing Fort Pulaski downstream from Savannah on the Savannah River. Federal forces made an unopposed landing on Tybee Island December 24, 1861. Guns and supplies for the reduction of Fort Pulaski were landed on Tybee Island on February 21. The siege batteries were ready by April 9. Fort Pulaski was then armed with 48 guns, 20 of which bore on the batteries on Tybee Island- 14 smoothbore guns and columbiads, one 24-pounder Blakely rifle, and four mortars. The garrison was 385 men.

At sunrise April 10, 1862, the Federal forces formally demanded the surrender of Fort Pulaski, the demand was refused and at 8:15 AM the first shot was fired. Confederate return fire was vigorous, but not very accurate and Fort Pulaski was breached that afternoon. The James rifles and 4.2-inch Parrott rifles did most of the damage to the fort. The Federal mortar fire was very inaccurate. After nightfall, a desultory fire was kept up, to prevent the Confederates from repairing the breach. After sunrise on April 11, firing resumed, and the breach was rapidly enlarged and eleven Confederate guns dismounted or otherwise rendered unserviceable. At 2:00 PM, Fort Pulaski surrendered. Remarkably, only one man on each side was killed in the lengthy artillery engagement.

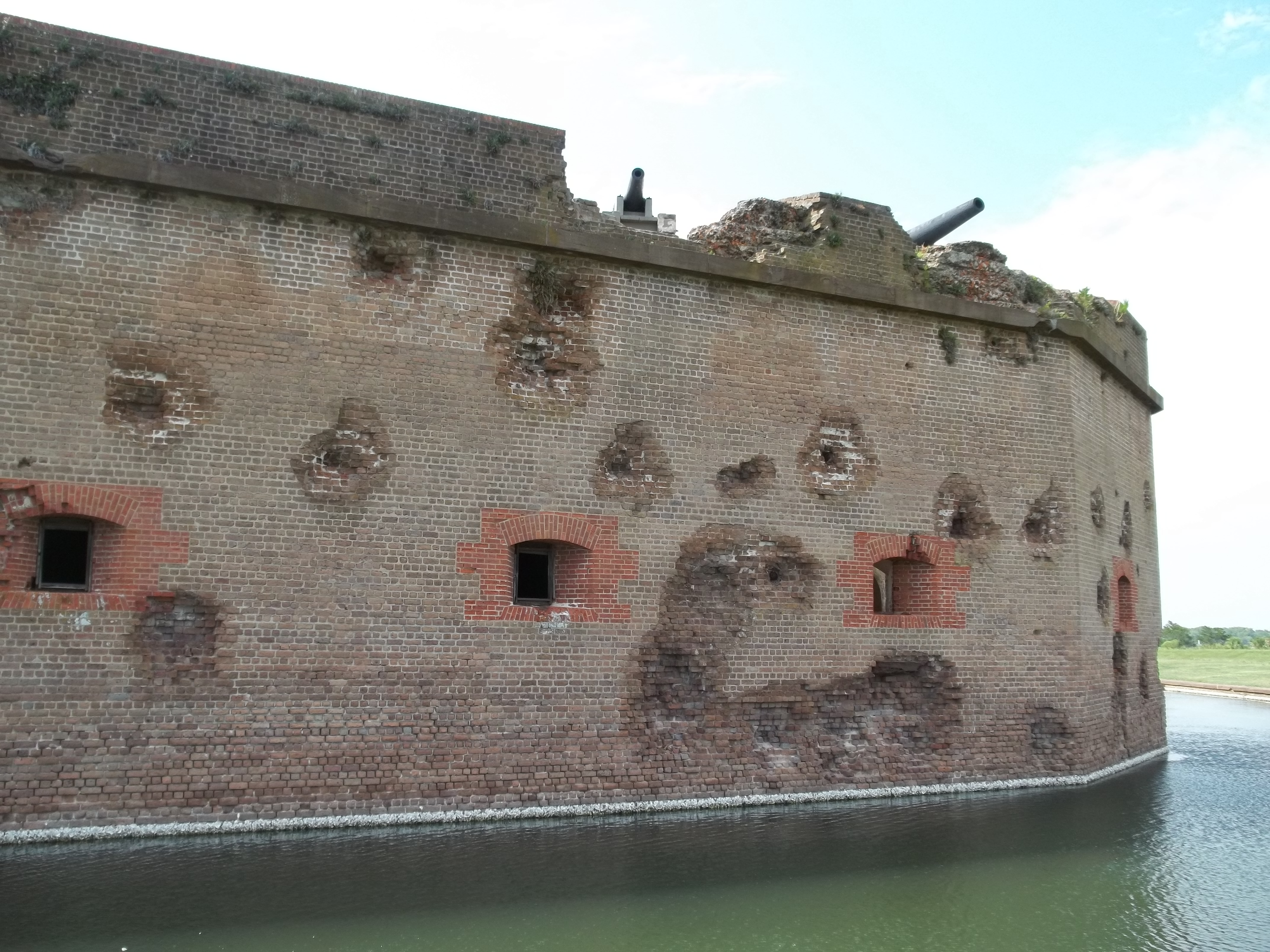
Heavy sustained damage scars of Union siege artillery at Fort Pulaski

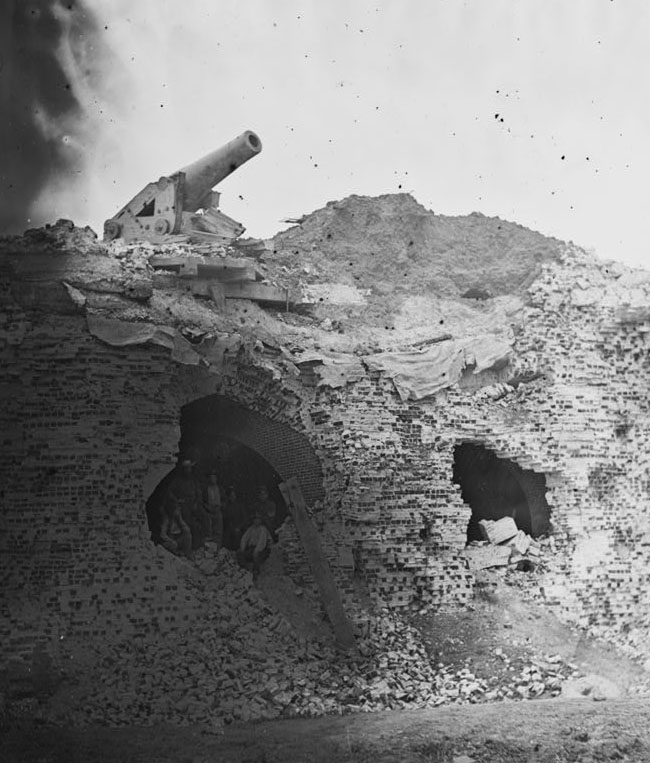
Photograph of the breach at Fort Pulaski

The fall of Fort Pulaski demonstrated that masonry fortifications were obsolete in the era of rifled artillery. General Gilmore, senior Federal engineer officer at Fort Pulaski, quoted a military treatise of the period as saying an "exposed wall may be breached with certainty at distances from 500 to 700 yards... and it will take from four to seven days firing..." (Gilmore 1882, p. 161). That had been with smoothbore guns; with rifled guns firing at distances of over 1,600 yards, the breach had been made in a day and a half.

==== Federal siege batteries at Fort Pulaski ====
	Armament	Range to Fort Pulaski
Battery Totten	4 10-inch siege mortars	1,650 yd.
Battery McClellan	2 42-pounders rifled (84-pounder James rifles) 2 32-pounders rifled (64-pounder James rifles)	1,650 yd.
Battery Sigel	5 4.2-inch (30-pounder) Parrott rifles 1 24-pounder rifled (48-pounder James rifle)	1,670 yd.
Battery Scott	3 10-inch and 1 8-inch columbiads	1,740 yd.
Battery Halleck	2 seacoast 13-inch mortars	2,400 yd
Battery Sherman	3 seacoast 13-inch mortars	2,650 yd
Battery Burnside	1 seacoast 13-inch mortar	2,750 yd
Battery Lincoln	3 heavy 8-inch columbiads	3,045 yd.
Battery Lyon	3 heavy 10-inch columbiads	3,100 yd.
Battery Grant	3 seacoast 13-inch mortars	3,200 yd.
Battery Stanton	3 seacoast 13-inch mortars	3,400 yd.

=== Campaign against Charleston Harbor ===
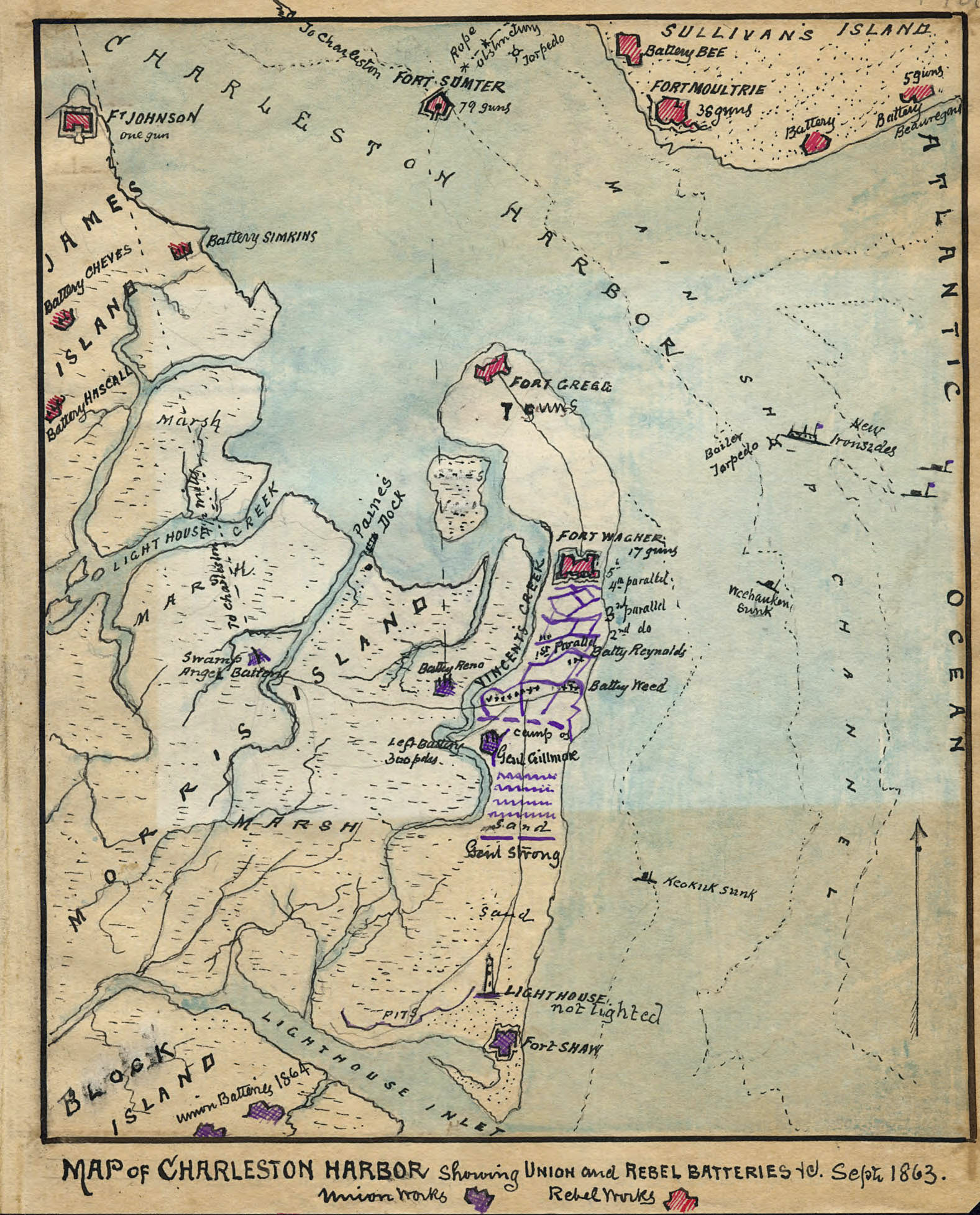
"Map of Charleston Harbor Showing Union and Rebel Batteries to September 1863." Period map drawn by Robert K. Sneden. "Left Batteries" actually at position indicated for "Battery Reno."

In 1863, the Union Army began operations designed to reduce Fort Sumter, so that the U.S. Navy could enter Charleston harbor and capture the city. On July 10, Federal forces on Folly Island, South Carolina, crossed Light House Inlet and landed by boats on the southern tip of Morris Island. Two unsuccessful infantry assaults were made against Fort Wagner, the second assault being led by the 54th Massachusetts Volunteer Infantry. On July 21, General Quincy Adams Gillmore began laying down batteries for the bombardment of Fort Sumter and Fort Wagner. Later a battery was created for guns to bombard the city of Charleston.

The campaign against Charleston Harbor was successful by many measurements. Morris Island was occupied, Fort Sumter was reduced, and the presence of Federal batteries sweeping the main channel into the harbor, effectively closed Charleston as a port for blockade runners. However, the long struggle on Morris Island gave the Confederates time to strengthen the harbor's other defensive works, and the U.S. Navy did not enter Charleston Harbor until after General William T. Sherman's advance through South Carolina finally forced the Confederates to evacuate the city on February 17, 1865.

==== Bombardment of Fort Sumter ====
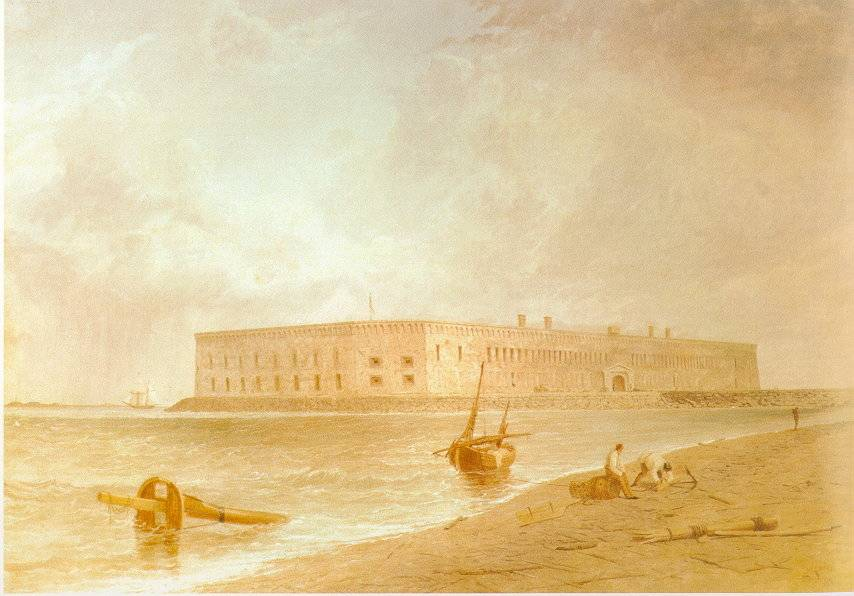
Painting of Fort Sumter showing exterior before the bombardment

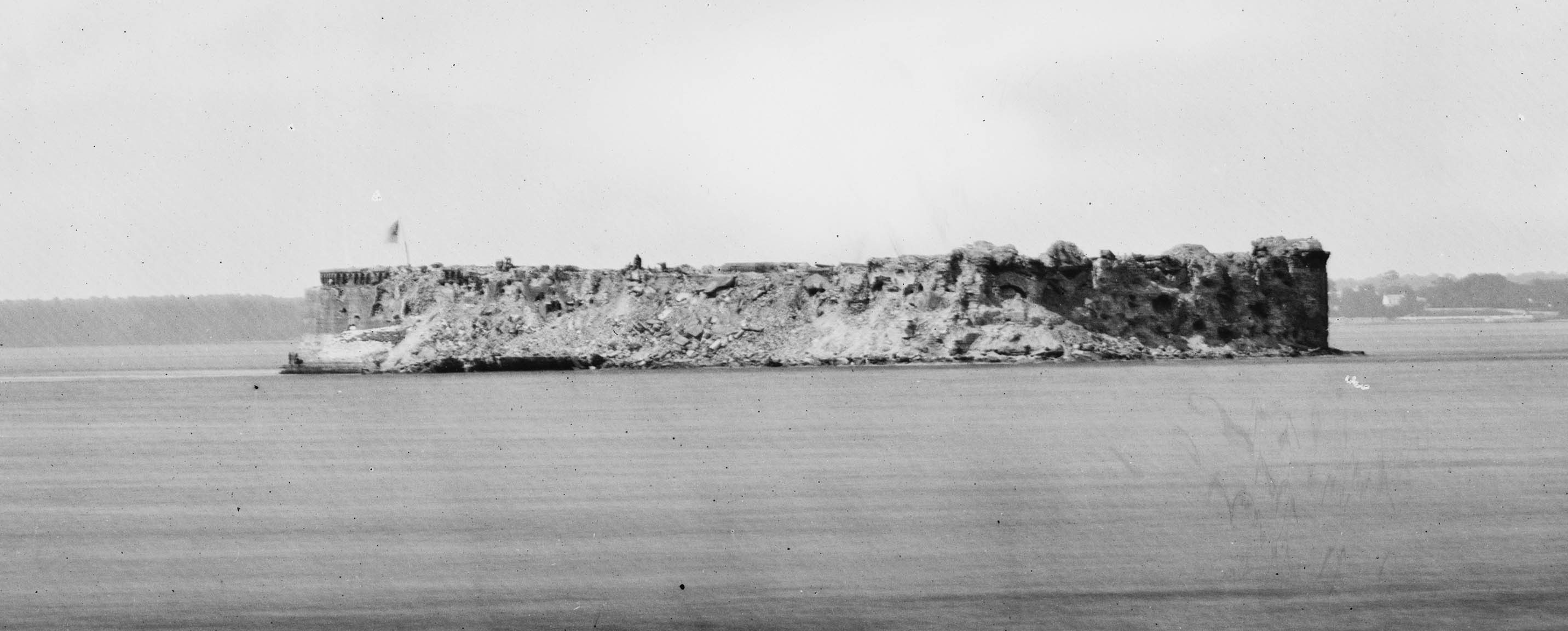
Photograph showing Fort Sumter on August 23, 1863

Work on most of the batteries for the pieces that were to bombard Fort Sumter was completed by August 16, 1863, and firing began the next day. By August 23, Fort Sumter was a ruin. 5,009 projectiles had been fired, with about half striking the fort. All of the parapet guns were dismounted or seriously damaged and the fort was no longer an effective part of the defenses of Charleston Harbor (Turner 1890, p. 216). From August 23–30, a desultory fire was directed on Fort Sumter to hinder repairs and the remounting of guns. On August 30–31, Fort Sumter was bombarded again, completing the destruction of the parapet (Turner 1890, p. 217). U.S. Navy forces attempted a landing against Fort Sumter on the night of September 8–9, 1863. It was defeated by Confederate infantry forces who had occupied the ruins.

Batteries for bombardment of Fort Sumter

	Location	Armament	Range to Ft. Sumter	Range to Ft Wagner
Battery Brown	right of 2nd parallel	2 8-inch Parrott rifles	3,560 yd.	830 yd.
Battery Rosecrans	center of 2nd parallel	3 6.4-inch Parrott rifles	3,500 yd.	830 yd.
Battery Meade	center of 2nd parallel	2 6.4-inch Parrott rifles	3,475 yd.	820 yd.
Naval Battery	center of 1st parallel	2 8-inch Parrott rifles 2 5-inch Whitworth rifles	3,980 yd.	1,335 yd.
Battery Hays (East section)	Left Batteries	1 8-inch Parrott rifle	4,225 yd.	1,710 yd.
Battery Reno	Left Batteries	1 8-inch Parrott rifle 2 6.4-inch Parrott rifles	4,320 yd.	1,860 yd.
Battery Stevens	Left Batteries	2 6.4-inch Parrott rifles	4,320 yd.	1,860 yd.
Battery Strong	Left Batteries	1 10-inch Parrott rifle	4,345 yd.	1,900 yd.
Battery Kirby	Left Batteries	2 10-inch seacoast mortars	4,400 yd.	1,960 yd.

==== Bombardment of Fort Wagner ====
After the failed infantry assaults, Gilmore decided to attack Fort Wagner by regular approaches using saps and parallels. On July 19, 1863, the first parallel was dug near the pre-existing Federal lines. Saps were driven forward and a second parallel was established by July 23. The second parallel contained batteries directed against both Fort Wagner and Fort Sumter. The Atlantic Ocean flank of the second parallel was anchored by "Surf Battery" built below the high tide line. The "Surf Battery" was armed with field howitzers and Requa volley guns (proto-machine guns capable of firing 175 rounds per minute) to defend the Federal trenches from Confederates sorties up the beach. Coehorn, 8-inch, and 10-inch mortars were used by the Federal troops as their trenches approached Fort Wagner and field artillery was placed in the trenches to defend against possible Confederate sorties.

While Fort Wagner was subject to near constant bombardment from the batteries listed in the table below, as approaches neared the fort's ditch, the bombardment increased. Fire from U.S. Navy ships, particularly the USS New Ironsides, proved very effective. The navy were able to skip the round shells from their XI-inch Dahlgren guns off the water, over the ramparts, and into the fort. Several heavy Parrott rifles that had been directed against Fort Sumter shelled Fort Wagner on September 5 and 6, 1863. Over 1,400 shells from 6.4-inch (100-pounder) Parrott rifles, 8-inch (200-pounder) Parrott rifles, and a 10-inch (300-pounder) Parrott rifle were fired into Fort Wagner (Gilmore 1890, p. 28). The destructive bombardment and the imminent Federal assault forced the Confederate garrison to evacuate both Fort Wagner and Fort Gregg during the night of September 7–8, 1863. A Federal officer inspecting the fort after its occupation said "Notwithstanding the heavy fire of this bombardment, together with all the fire Fort Wagner had been subjected to since the commencement of our attack, from land and naval batteries, its defenses were not materially injured; that is to say, the parapets, bomb-proofs, and traverses of sand still remained and would have afforded shelter to infantry behind them, though greatly tossed about and torn up by our projectiles, but, under our fire, it was impossible to serve their artillery, nor could they expose themselves outside of their bomb-proof for an instant" (Turner 1890, pp. 218–219).

Batteries for bombardment of Fort Wagner

	Location	Armament	Range to Ft Wagner
Battery Hays (west section)	Left Batteries	7 4.2-inch Parrott rifles	1,830 yd.
Battery Weed	Rear of 1st parallel	5 10-inch siege mortars	1,460 yd.
Battery Reynolds	Right of 1st parallel	5 10-inch siege mortars	1,335 yd.
Battery Kearny	Extreme left of 2nd parallel	3 4.2-inch Parrott rifles	720 yd.
Surf Battery	Extreme right of 2nd parallel	3 field howitzers 3 Requa volley guns	---

==== Bombardment of the city of Charleston ====
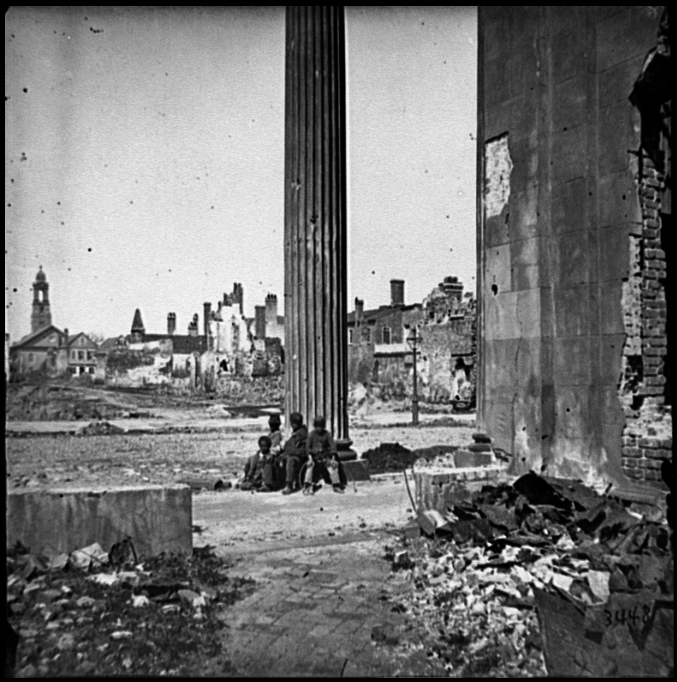
Photograph of Charleston showing damage from the bombardment

Gilmore determined to bombard the city of Charleston. Under the existing rules of warfare, Charleston was a legitimate target. It was fortified, contained weapons factories, and was a port for blockade runners who carried contraband of war. But more importantly, Charleston was the symbol of rebellion. It was there that South Carolina became the first state to secede. The firing on Fort Sumter in 1861, which started the war, only increased the North's belief that Charleston's destruction was just retribution. (Wise 1994, p. 169).

Using tremendous skills and ingenuity, Gilmore's engineers constructed the "Marsh Battery" in the marsh between James Island and Morris Island. An 8-inch Parrott Rifle, nicknamed the "Swamp Angel," was mounted in the battery, and began firing at the city at 1:30 AM, August 22, 1863. At a range of 7,900 yards, the gun was aimed by taking compass bearings off St. Michael’s church’s steeple. The first night, 10 incendiary and 6 explosive shells were fired into the city. The gun was not fired on the 23rd. On August 24, on firing its 36th round, the Swamp Angel burst. In its short life, the Swamp Angel made artillery history as it was the longest-ranged artillery bombardment up to that date, and it was the first time artillery had been aimed by compass bearing (Wise 1994, p. 172). The Swamp Angel was not replaced in the Marsh Battery, but after the fall of Fort Wagner and Fort Gregg Federal batteries located in and near Fort Gregg (renamed Fort Putnam) resumed fire on Charleston, continuing until the city was evacuated.

=== Siege of Petersburg ===
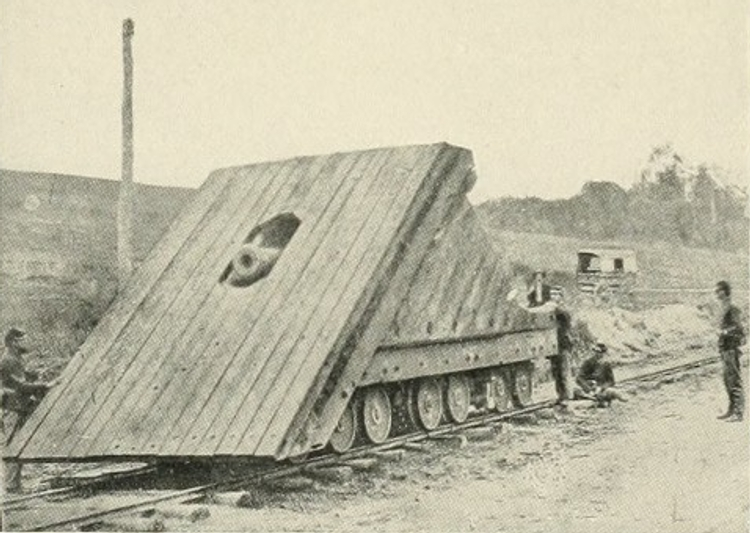
The Confederate Lee-Brooke Rail Gun equipped with a Brooke banded rifle on the City Point Railroad during the Siege of Petersburg

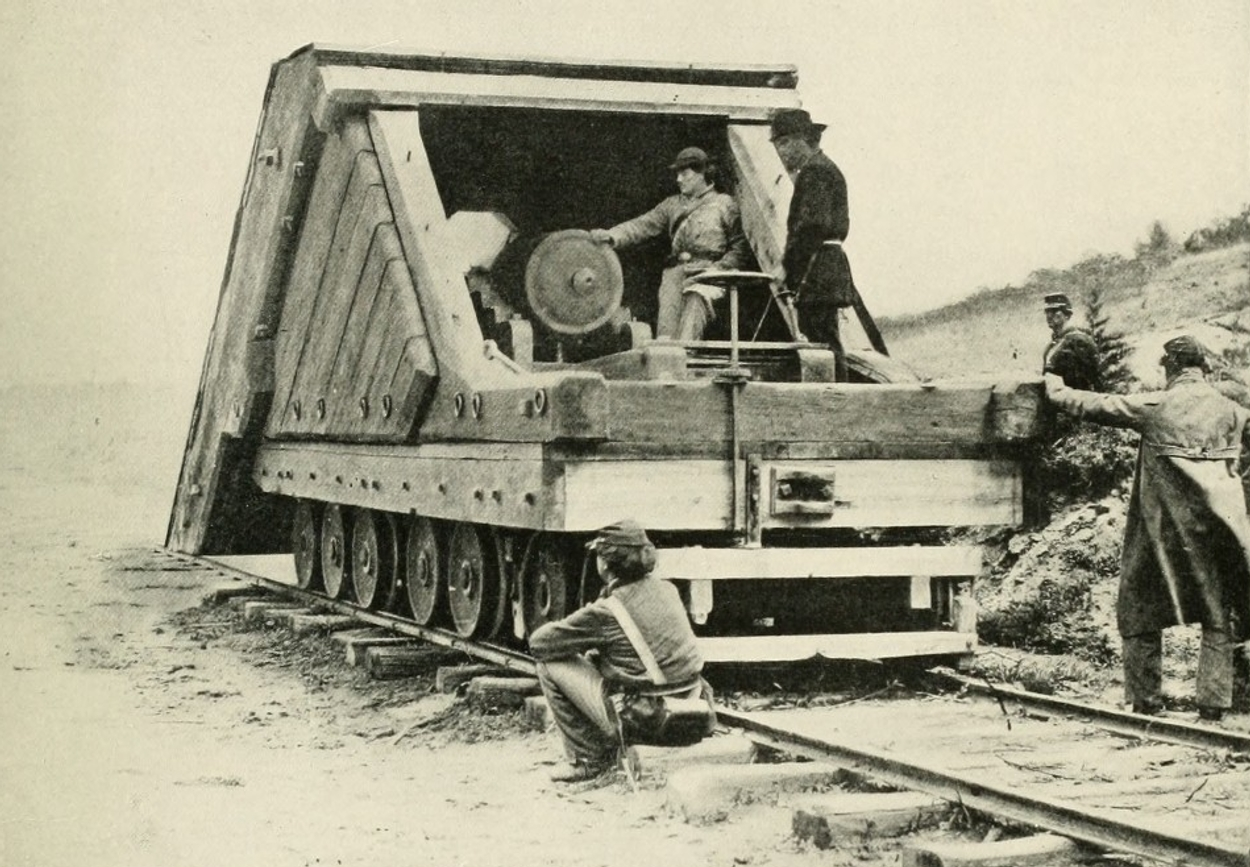
The Confederate Lee-Brooke Rail Gun captured by Union forces at the Siege of Petersburg

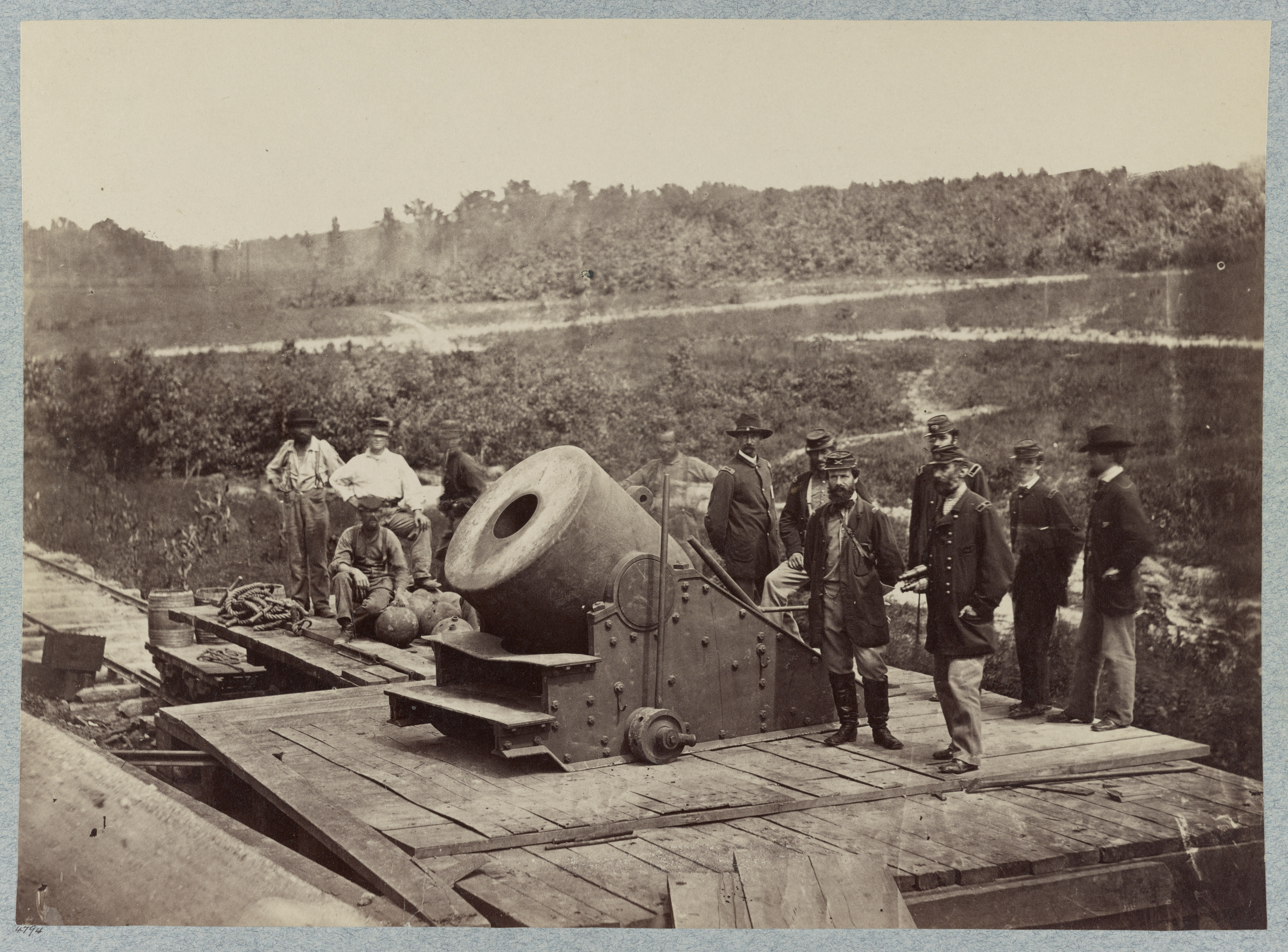
The Dictator siege mortar at Petersburg

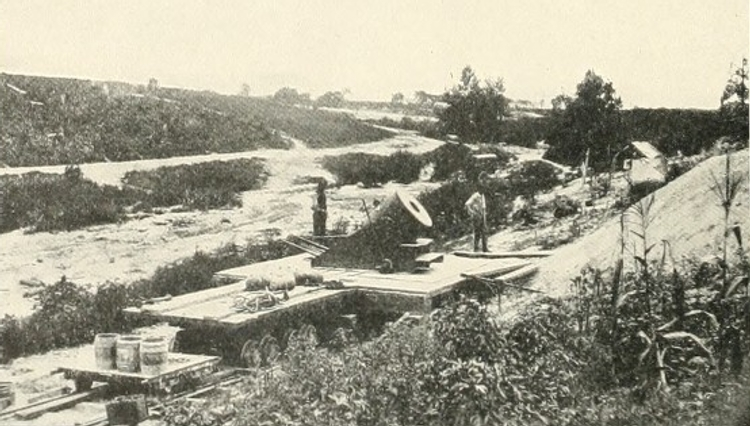
The Dictator at Petersburg on its rolling platform

During the siege of Petersburg, no attempts were made by Federal artillery to level the Confederate works. Attempts to clear the abatis in front of the works by gunfire were unsuccessful. The rifled guns were therefore used to keep down the Confederate fire, annoy their working parties, interfere with traffic on the Petersburg bridges, and to repel or support assaults. Rifled guns in Federal batteries on the James River were used against the Confederate James River Flotilla (Abbot 1867, p. 85).

With rifled guns unable to harm opposing forces behind earthen field works, mortars became more important. Federal forces fired over 40,000 mortar rounds during the siege, and the Confederates returned a nearly equal fire (Abbot 1867, pp. 18–19).

The Federal forces mounted a 13-inch Coehorn mortar on a railroad flatcar. This mortar was nicknamed the Dictator. The car was fired from a section of the Petersburg and City Point Railroad where moving the car along a curve in the track trained the gun on different targets along the Confederate lines. When charged with 14 pounds of powder the mortar would recoil less than two feet on the flatcar, but the flatcar would recoil 10 to 12 feet on the tracks. The plane of fire had to be nearly parallel to the tracks, to allow the flatcar to recoil and avoid dismounting the mortar, but by using a curved section of track a wide traverse could be achieved. Fire from the Dictator was very effective. At a range of 3,600 yards, one round was reported as having blown a Confederate field gun and carriage above the parapet of the Confederate works (Abbot 1867, p. 23). The Dictator silenced the Confederate guns on Chesterfield Heights to prevent them from enfilading the right end of the Union line.

Federal siege train at the siege of Petersburg April 2, 1865

Name	Total	In Depot
8-inch siege howitzers	12	4
Coehorn mortars	36	20
8-inch siege mortars	20	4
10-inch siege mortars	10	6
10-inch seacoast mortars	6	3
13-inch seacoast mortars	1	1
4.2-inch Parrott rifles	44	24
4.5-inch siege rifles	17	10
4.6-inch Brooke rifle	1	0
6.4-inch Parrott rifles	13	1

Source: (Abbot 1867, p. 160)

Notes: The 8-inch siege howitzer is not reported to have been fired (Abbot 1867, pp. 169–170).

The presence of the Confederate 4.6-inch Brooke rifle in the Federal siege train is unexplained. It was emplaced in Fort Cummings and could presumably have fired ammunition designed for the 4.5-inch siege rifle. It is also confusingly reported as being of English manufacture (Hunt 1894, p. 660).

== See also ==
- Civil War Defenses of Washington
- Field artillery in the American Civil War
- Seacoast defense in the United States

== Bibliography ==
- Abbot, Henry L. (1867). "Siege artillery in the Campaigns Against Richmond, with Notes on the 15-inch Gun, Including an Algebraic Analysis of the Trajectory of a Shot in its Ricochets Upon Smooth Water". Professional Papers of the Corps of Engineers United States Army. 14. Washington D.C.: Government Printing Office.
- Alexander, Edward Porter (1883). "Confederate Artillery Service". Southern Historical Society Papers. XI. Southern Historical Society: 98–113.
- Dew, Charles (1999). Ironmaker to the Confederacy (2nd ed.). Richmond: Library of Virginia.
- Gibbon, John (1863). The Artillerist's Manual (2nd ed.). New York: D. Van Nostrand.
- Gilmore, Q.A. (1882). "Report from Hilton Head, S.C., October 20, 1865". The War of the Rebellion: A Compilation of the Official Records of the Union and Confederate Armies, Series I. VI. Washington, D.C.: Government Printing Office: 148–65.
- Gilmore, Q.A. (1890). "Report of Maj. Gen. Quincy A. Gilmore, U.S. Army, Commanding Department of the South with Congratulatory Orders". The War of the Rebellion: A Compilation of the Official Records of the Union and Confederate Armies, Series I. XXVIII (Part I). Washington, D.C.: Government Printing Office: 3–40.
- Hickenlooper, Andrew (1888). "The Vicksburg Mine". Battles and Leaders of the Civil War (Thomas Yoseloff, 1956 Edition). III. New York: Century Co.: 539–542.
- Hunt, Henry J. (1894). "Report of Bvt. Maj. Gen. Henry J. Hunt, U.S. Army, June 1, 1865". The War of the Rebellion: A Compilation of the Official Records of the Union and Confederate Armies, Series I. XLVI (Part I). Washington, D.C.: Government Printing Office: 659–662.
- Mancucy, Albert (1955). Artillery Through the Ages: A Short Illustrated History of Cannon, Emphasizing Types Used in America. Washington, D.C.: Government Printing Office. Archived from the original on July 2, 2007.
- Olmstead, Edwin; Stark, Wayne E.; Tucker, Spencer C. (1997). The Big Guns: Civil War Siege, Seacoast, and Naval Cannon. Museum Restoration Service. ISBN 0-888-55012-X.
- Parrott, Robert P. (1863). Ranges of Parrott Guns and Notes for Practice. New York: D. Van Nostrand.
- Ripley, Warren (1984). Artillery and Ammunition of the Civil War. Charleston, S.C.: The Battery Press. OCLC 12668104.
- Turner, John W. (1890). "Reports". The War of the Rebellion: A Compilation of the Official Records of the Union and Confederate Armies, Series I. XXVIII (Part I). Washington, D.C.: Government Printing Office: 212–225.
- Wise, Stephen R. (1994). Gate of Hell: Campaign for Charleston Harbor, 1863. Columbia, S.C.: University of South Carolina Press.
