= Coehorn =

Lightweight artillery that fires at a high angle

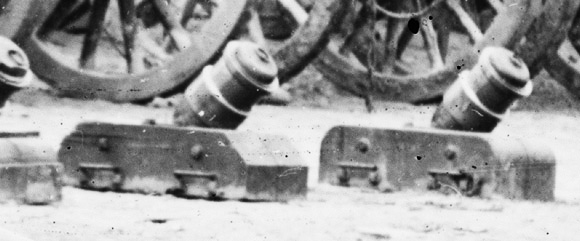
1841 US Coehorn mortars, photographed in 1865

A Coehorn /ˈkoʊhɔːrn/ (also spelled cohorn) is a lightweight mortar that was designed by Dutch military engineer Menno van Coehoorn.

== Concept and design ==
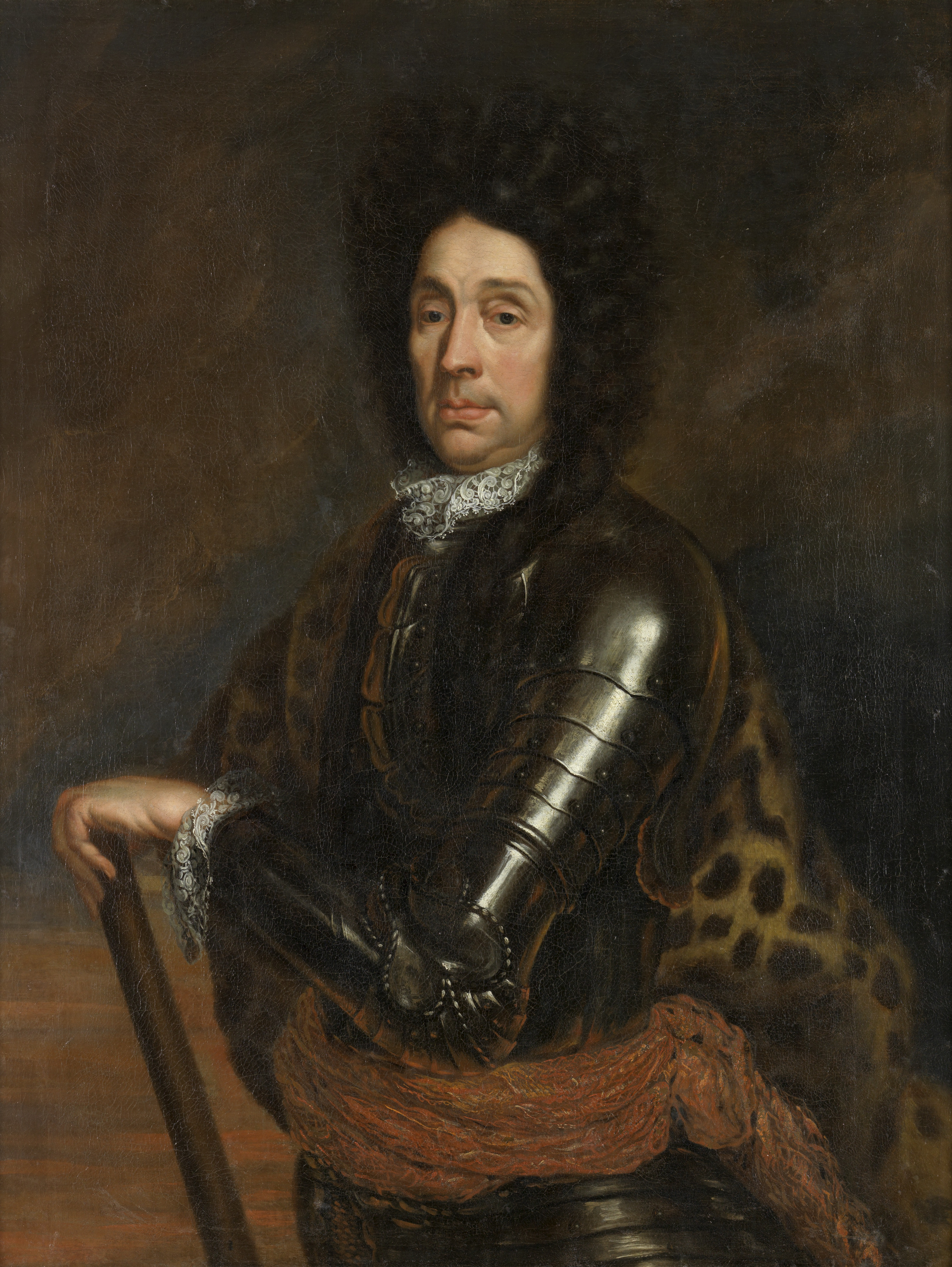
Portrait of van Coehoorn

Van Coehoorn came to prominence during the 1688–1697 Nine Years War, whose tactics have been summarised by historian John Childs: "The majority of infantrymen never fired their muskets in anger; ... armies were consciously geared towards the dominant forms of warfare: manoeuvre and the siege." This emphasis on siege warfare led to many developments in the use and design of artillery.

Fortifications were vulnerable to vertical trajectory or plunging fire, and the concept of mortars was well understood, but large-scale mortars were initially used only to provide close support for infantry assaults on fortified positions. Van Coehoorn demonstrated them in May 1701 to William III of England, and they were first used in action at the siege of Kaiserswerth in 1702.

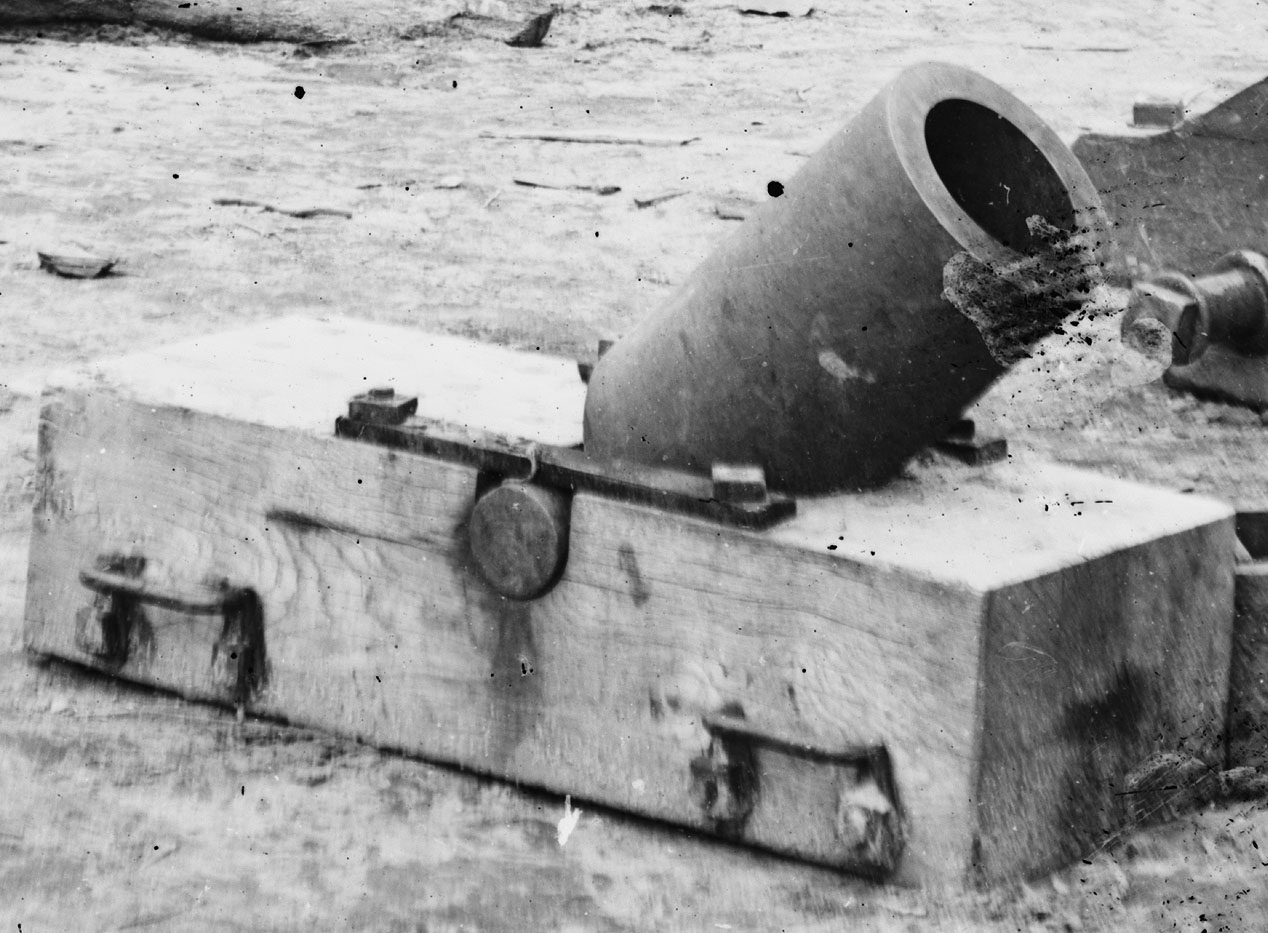
A Confederate-built rough iron 24-pounder Coehorn at Petersburg in 1864

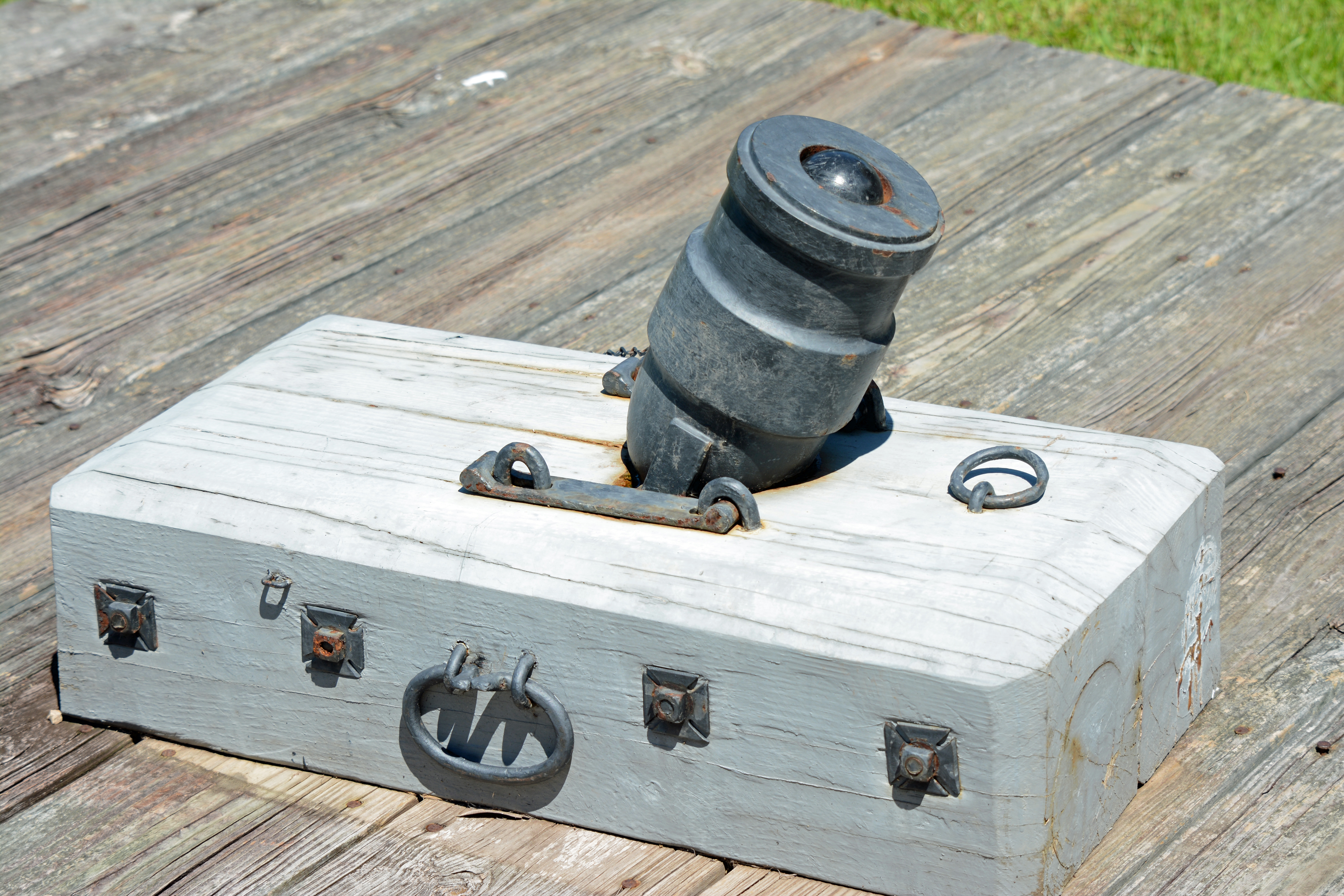
Coehorn at Fort King George

The original Coehorn was light enough to be moved by as few as two men, although a four-man crew was more practical for rapid movement. It proved immediately popular: the 74 used at Kaiserswerth were increased to over 300 at Bonn six months later. Fortifications of the period were primarily designed to resist horizontal fire, making the vertical trajectory and plunging fire of the Coehorn highly effective at short range. It used a powder-filled, time-fused shell, the range being adjusted by changing the size of the charge. The low muzzle velocity meant the shell's high, arching flight could be easily observed from ground level, but this was not necessarily a problem, since the gun's original purpose was to provide cover rather than inflict casualties.

== Historical uses in battle ==
While generally employed in siege warfare, Coehorns were also used by British troops at the Battle of Glen Shiel in June 1719.

In the 1861–1865 American Civil War, the Federal siege artillery units had both 12- and 24-pounder versions, while the Confederates constructed copies of the 24-pounder using rough iron. At the 1863 siege of Vicksburg, the Union forces had so little artillery that "wooden [coehorns] were made by taking logs of the toughest wood that could be found, boring them out for six or twelve pound shells and binding them with strong iron bands".

After the outbreak of the First World War, trench warfare soon developed, and it became apparent that the British had nothing to match the German minenwerfer. While an effective British weapon was in development, the French army provided Colonel Toby Rawlinson with 40 obsolete Coehorn mortars, which became known as "Toby mortars". These were used in action at the Battle of Neuve Chapelle and the Battle of Aubers during the spring of 1915, and were quickly retired on the arrival of the new Stokes mortars later that year.

The British Army used the Coehorn in the wars against the Maoris because horizontal cannon shot would often fail to penetrate the thick woven barrier mats that were hung outside Maori fortifications to protect the wooden structures. The vertical trajectory and plunging fire of the Coehorns was very effective in this application.

Cannons resembling coehorns were made by Hmong rebels during Vue Pa Chay's revolt. They were made with the trunks of trees, packed with scrap metal as projectiles and a large quantity of gunpowder. These cannons were said to have weighed over 200 lb (91 kg).

== Firing process ==
By the time of the U.S. Civil War, the Instruction for Heavy Artillery suggested a crew of three using an 18 in (460 mm) rammer and sponge, primer pouch, gunners pouch with level, and pincers with a quadrant and plummet for aiming. Range required adjustment in the size of the powder charge; the 24-pounder version could theoretically fire a 17 lb shell (5.82 in) up to 1,200 yards (1,100 metres), but this was optimistic. It generally employed a paper fuse with a known burn rate and a hollow conical wooden plug.
