= List of ship launches in 1868 =

The list of ship launches in 1868 includes a chronological list of some ships launched in 1868.

Date	Ship	Class	Builder	Location	Country	Notes
8 January	Piauí	Pará-class monitor	Arsenal de Marinha da Côrte	Rio de Janeiro	Brazil	For Imperial Brazilian Navy.
10 January	Dunvegan Castle	Steamship	Messrs. Blackwood & Gordon	Port Glasgow	United Kingdom	For Martin Orme, or William Lang and others.
10 January	Elk	Beacon-class gunvessel		Portsmouth Dockyard	United Kingdom	For Royal Navy.
10 January	Nisshin	Sloop-of-war	C. Gips & Co.	Dordrecht	Netherlands	For Imperial Japanese Navy.
10 January	William Lindsay	East Indiaman	Messrs. John Reid & Co.	Port Glasgow	United Kingdom	For William Lindsay and others.
11 January	Chieftain	Barque	W. Kinloch	Garmouth	United Kingdom	For Mr. Wilson and others.
11 January	Columbine	Steamship	Messrs. Charles Connell & Co.	Overnewton	United Kingdom	For Messrs C. Connell & Co., and Messrs. J. Howden & Co.
11 January	Sakura	Steamship	Messrs. Henderson, Coulborn & Co.	Renfrew	United Kingdom	For private owner.
11 January	Saturno	Steamship	Messrs. William Denny & Bros.	Dumbarton	United Kingdom	For Österreichischer Lloyd.
13 January	Cwm Avon	Schooner	Alfred Cook	Appledore	United Kingdom	For English Copper Co.
14 January	Panter	Heiligerlee-class monitor	Laird Bros.	Birkenhead	United Kingdom	For Royal Netherlands Navy.
15 January	Louisa	Smack	Hunt	Aldeburgh	United Kingdom	For John Collis.
18 January	Schorpioen	Schorpioen-class monitor	Société Nouvelle des Forges et Chantiers de la Méditerranée	La Seyne-sur-Mer	France	For Royal Netherlands Navy.
23 January	City of Edinburgh	Merchantman	Messrs. Barclay, Curle & Co.	Stobcross	United Kingdom	For Messrs. George Smith & Sons.
25 January	Broughton	Sailing ship	Harland & Wolff	Belfast	United Kingdom	For Ismay, Imrie & Co.
25 January	Helen Black	Barque	Messrs. Alexander Hall, Russel, & Co.	Aberdeen	United Kingdom	For Messrs. Glover Bros.
28 January	Lizzy	Barque	Messrs. John Wray & Son	Burton Stather	United Kingdom	For private owner.
29 January	Walney	Paddle steamer	Messrs. Macnab & Co.	Greenock	United Kingdom	For Furness Railway.
January	Achievement	Barque	Messrs. Dobie & Co.	Govan	United Kingdom	For Doward, Dickinson & Co.
January	County of Stirling	East Indiaman	C. Connell & Co.	Kelvinhaugh	United Kingdom	For Messrs. R. & J. Craig.
January	James Mason	Brig	R. Pace & Son	Sunderland	United Kingdom	For Tully & Co.
January	Windhover	Clipper	Connell & Co	Glasgow	United Kingdom	For Findlay & Co.
1 February	Fulmar	Steamship	Backhouse & Dixon	Middlesbrough	United Kingdom	For James Dixon.
8 February	Artigas	Steamship	Messrs. T. Wingate & Co.	Whiteinch	United Kingdom	For Messrs. John Proudfoot & Co.
8 February	Perseverance	Brig	Messrs. John Humphrey & Co.	Aberdeen	United Kingdom	For Messrs. Robb, Stephen and others.
9 February	Eagle Wing	Schooner		Dartmouth	United Kingdom	Collided with HMS Britannia on being launched and was severely damaged.
10 February	Babara Moir	Schooner	John Webster	Fraserburgh	United Kingdom	For private owner.
10 February	Hercules	central battery ironclad		Chatham Dockyard	United Kingdom	For Royal Navy.
10 February	Neva	Steamship	Messrs. Caird & Co.	Greenock	United Kingdom	For Royal Mail Steam Packet Company.
10 February	Nyassa	Clipper	Messrs. Joseph Birnie & Co.	Montrose	United Kingdom	For private owner.
12 February	Magpie	Beacon-class gunvessel		Portsmouth Dockyard	United Kingdom	For Royal Navy.
13 February	Sultana	Paddle steamer	Messrs. Robertson & Co.	Greenock	United Kingdom	For Mr. Williamson.
13 February	Vanguard	Paddle tug	Messrs. Robertson & Co.	Greenock	United Kingdom	For Glasgow & Greenock Shipping Co.
14 February	Peter Stuart	Merchantman	Messrs. A. M'Millan & Son	Dumbarton	United Kingdom	For Messrs. Stuart & Douglas.
18 February	St. Clair	Steamship	Messrs. Randolph, Elder, & Co.	Fairfield	United Kingdom	For Aberdeen, Leith, and Clyde Shipping Co.
24 February	South Australian	Clipper	William Pile	Sunderland	United Kingdom	For Adelaide Line.
25 February	Medea	Merchantman	Messrs. Barclay, Curle & Co.	Clydeholm	United Kingdom	For John H. Carmichael.
26 February	Janet Wignall	Schooner	Messrs. Calderwood & Co.	Irvine	United Kingdom	For Messrs. Wignall & Co.
27 February	Cartsburn	Steamship	Messrs. Steele & Co.	Greenock	United Kingdom	For Messrs. Robert Shankland & Co.
February	Ben Ledi	East Indiaman	Messrs. Barclay, Curle & Co.	Whiteinch	United Kingdom	For Messrs. Watson Bros.
February	City of Brussels	Steamship	Messrs. Randolph, Elder & Co	Govan	United Kingdom	For London, Belgian, Brazil, and River Plate Mail Steamship Co, or Peter Tait & Co.
February	De Tijger	Monitor	Messrs. Randolph, Elder & Co.	Fairfield	United Kingdom	For Royal Netherlands Navy.
February	Gorey Lass	Dandy	Charles W. Aubin	Jersey	(United Kingdom of Great Britain and Ireland) Jersey	For J. M. Kent.
February	Gozo	Steamship	Messrs. Earle	Hull	United Kingdom	For Messrs. T. Wilson & Co.
February	Hope	Barque	J. & E. Lumsden	Pallion	United Kingdom	For Thomas Thompson.
February	Illawarra	Steamship	J. G. Lawrie	Whiteinch	United Kingdom	For private owner.
February	Maggie Ann	Steamship	Messrs. H. Murray & Co.	Port Glasgow	United Kingdom	For Messrs. Templeton & Hunter.
February	Mary Moore	Barque	Messrs. A. Stephen & Sons	Kelvinhaugh	United Kingdom	For John Norman Jr.
February	Minnie	Schooner	Messrs. Barr & Shearer	Ardrossan	United Kingdom	For Mr. Spence.
February	Naposta	Steamship		River Clyde	United Kingdom	For private owner.
February	Selix	Steamship	Messrs. A. & J. Inglis	Pointhouse	United Kingdom	For private owner.
Unknown date	Willing	Schooner	Philip Bellot	Gorey	(United Kingdom of Great Britain and Ireland) Jersey	For Clement Noel.
6 March	Seagull	Plover-class gunvessel		Devonport Dockyard	United Kingdom	For Royal Navy.
7 March	Fairy	Steamship	Messrs. C. & W. Earle	Hull	United Kingdom	For Messrs. Lofthouse, Glover & Co.
7 March	Solway	Brig	R. Williamson & Son	Harrington	United Kingdom	For R. Williamson & Son.
7 March	Tenby Castle	Barque	Messrs. R. & J. Evans & Co.	Liverpool	United Kingdom	For Messrs. Richards, Mills & Co.
7 March	Traveller	Schooner	Frances Robertson	Peterhead	United Kingdom	For J. Ewen and A. Simpson.
7 March	Wythop	Brig		Harrington	United Kingdom	For private owner.
9 March	Coquette	Brig	Bevan	Llanelly	United Kingdom	For Joseph Hatton.
9 March	Holsatia	Steamship	Messrs. Caird & Co.	Greenock	United Kingdom	For Hamburg-Amerikanische Packetfahrt-Aktien-Gesellschaft.
10 March	Buffel	Buffel-class monitor	Robert Napier and Sons	Glasgow	United Kingdom	For Royal Netherlands Navy.
10 March	Hornet	Beacon-class gunvessel	Messrs. Pearse, Lockwood & Co.	Stockton-on-Tees	United Kingdom	For Royal Navy.
10 March	Quang Tung	Steamship	Messrs. Hall, Russell & Co.	Footdee	United Kingdom	For Messrs. Douglas, Lapraik & Co.
10 March	Reine Blanche	Alma-class ironclad		Lorient	France	For French Navy.
12 March	Lancelot	Paddle steamer	Messrs. Robert Duncan & Co.	Port Glasgow	United Kingdom	For private owner.
12 March	Nymph	Steamship	Messrs. C. Connell & Co	Overnewton	United Kingdom	For private owner.
13 March	Zadok	Barque	Messrs. Bowdler & Chaffer	Seacombe	United Kingdom	For Messrs. J. Glyn & Sons.
16 March	Margaret Shearer	Smack	Messrs. Scott & Macgill	Bowling	United Kingdom	For Messrs. Shearer.
21 March	Grinder	Tug	John White	Cowes	United Kingdom	For British Government.
22 March	Ceará	Pará-class monitor	Arsenal de Marinha da Côrte	Rio de Janeiro	Brazil	For Imperial Brazilian Navy.
25 March	Nucteris	Schooner	Hansen	East Cowes	United Kingdom	For J. Batt.
26 March	Duke of Sutherland	Paddle steamer	A. Leslie and Company	Hebburn	United Kingdom	For London and North Western Railway.
26 March	Kwang Tung	Gunboat	William Denny and Brothers	Dumbarton	United Kingdom	For Viceroy of Canton.
26 March	Shang Tung	Gunboat	William Denny and Brothers	Dumbarton	United Kingdom	For Viceroy of Canton.
28 March	Madeleine	Yacht	David Kurby	Rye, New York	United States	For Josephus Williams & David Snediker.
28 March	Yosemite	Merchantman	Messrs. Dobie & Co.	Govan	United Kingdom	For Messrs. T. H. Ismay & Co.
30 March	Ozorio	Paddle steamer	Messrs. Robertson & Co.	Greenock	United Kingdom	For John Kincaid.
March	Lady of the Isles	Dandy	Charles W. Aubin	Jersey	(United Kingdom of Great Britain and Ireland) Jersey	For Philip Daniel Payn.
March	William Cargill	Schooner	Hempstead Barnes	Gloucester	United Kingdom	For James Duncan.
3 April	Mary Richmond	Brigantine	Messrs. Boyd & Turner	Dumbarton	United Kingdom	For Mr. Richmond and others.
5 April	Stier	Schorpioen-class monitor	John Laird, Son & Co.	Birkenhead	United Kingdom	For Royal Netherlands Navy.
7 April	Cambria	Schooner	Ratsey	Cowes	United Kingdom	For James Ashbury.
7 April	Madge Wildfire	Schooner	Messrs. Fullarton	Ayr	United Kingdom	For Messrs. Lewis, Potter & Co.
9 April	Atalante	Alma-class ironclad		Cherbourg	France	For French Navy.
9 April	Cambria	Yacht	Ratsey	Cowes	United Kingdom	For Mr. Ashbury.
9 April	Copsefield	Barque	Messrs. Henderson, Coulborn & Co.	Renfrew	United Kingdom	For Messrs. Scrutton & Campbell.
9 April	Mochurn Lass	Schooner	M'Lea	Rothesay	United Kingdom	For James M'Master.
9 April	Royal Oak	Cutter	Messrs. Camper & Nicholson	Gosport	United Kingdom	For E. Meldrum.
9 April	Severn	Paddle steamer	Messrs. Bowdler & Chaffer	Seacombe	United Kingdom	For London and North Western Railway and Great Western Railway.
9 April	Thames	Paddle steamer	Messrs. Bowdler & Chaffer	Seacombe	United Kingdom	For London and North Western Railway and Great Western Railway.
9 April	Walter Baine	Merchantman	Messrs. Robert Steele & Co.	Greenock	United Kingdom	For Messrs. Baine & Johnstone.
11 April	Glencairn	Steamship	Messrs. Backhouse & Dixon	Middlesbrough-on-Tees	United Kingdom	For Messrs. Gillan, Schmitz & Co.
21 April	Blanche	Yacht	E. Robertson	Ipswich	United Kingdom	For W. Thompson.
21 April	Rina	Schooner	John M'Quistan	Largs	United Kingdom	For private owner.
23 April	Craig Ewan	Schooner	Messrs. Stephen & Forbes	Peterhead	United Kingdom	For George Mitchell.
23 April	Margaret Galbraith	Merchantman	Messrs. Robert Duncan & Co.	Port Glasgow	United Kingdom	For Messrs. P. Henderson & Co, or Albion Shipping Co.
Unknown date	Swallow	Smack	Brundrit & Whiteway	Runcorn	United Kingdom	For Brundrit & Whiteway.
24 April	Ascalon	Merchantman	Messrs. Walter Hood & Co.	Aberdeen	United Kingdom	For private owner.
25 April	König Wilhelm	Armoured frigate	Thames Iron Works	Leamouth	United Kingdom	For Prussian Navy.
25 April	Lynx	Beacon-class gunboat	Harland & Wolff	Belfast	United Kingdom	For Royal Navy.
25 April	Repulse	Bulwark-class battleship	Woolwich Dockyard	Woolwich	United Kingdom	For Royal Navy.
25 April	Unnamed	Barque	William Duthie Jr.	Aberdeen	United Kingdom	Built on speculation.
26 April	Sirius	Eclipse-class sloop		Portsmouth Dockyard	United Kingdom	For Royal Navy.
April	Annie Richmond	Barque	Messrs. Alexander Stephen & Sons	Kelvinhaugh	United Kingdom	For R. G. Sharp.
April	Berbice	Merchantman	Messrs. A. M'Millen & Co.	Dumbarton	United Kingdom	For John Kerr.
April	Cambria	Yacht	Ratsey	Cowes	United Kingdom	For J. Ashbury.
April	Candidate	Full-rigged ship	Messrs. Dobie & Co.	Govan	United Kingdom	For Mr. Gambles.
April	Leading Star	Brig	J. Barkes	Sunderland	United Kingdom	For J. Barkes.
April	Manly	Paddle tug	Messrs. J. & G. Rennie	Govan	United Kingdom	For Royal Navy.
April	Mary Orr	Schooner	Messrs. Charles Connell & Co.	Kelvinhaugh	United Kingdom	For William Smith and others.
April	Mermaid	Ketch	Charles W. Aubin	Jersey	(United Kingdom of Great Britain and Ireland) Jersey	For John George Pascoe.
April	Mersey	Paddle steamer	Messrs. Bowdler, Chaffer & Co.	Seacombe	United Kingdom	For London and North Western Railway.
5 May	Santa Catharina	Pará-class monitor	Arsenal de Marinha da Côrte	Rio de Janeiro	Brazil	For Imperial Brazilian Navy.
6 May	El Capitan	Paddle steamer	Messrs. Robertson & Co.	Greenock	United Kingdom	For David Bruce.
7 May	Buckinghamshire	East Indiaman	Messrs. Barclay, Curle & Co.	Whiteinch	United Kingdom	For George Marshall.
7 May	Dynameme	Yawl	Messrs. Harvey & Co.	Wivenhoe	United Kingdom	For private owner.
7 May	Guinevere	Yacht	Messrs. Camper & Nicholson	Gosport	United Kingdom	For Mr. Thellusson.
7 May	Lizzie Iredale	Barque	Messrs. Alexander Stephen & Sons	Kelvinhaugh	United Kingdom	For Peter Iredale.
7 May	The Prince	Steamship	Messrs. Aitken & Mansel	Whiteinch	United Kingdom	For Glasgow and Newcastle Steam Shipping Co.
9 May	Alcatraz	Full-rigged ship	Messrs. Bowdler, Chaffer & Co.	Seacombe	United Kingdom	For Messrs. W. T. Myers & Co.
9 May	Ferryhill	Brig	Messrs. John Humphrey Jr., & Co.	Aberdeen	United Kingdom	For John M'Lauchlan.
9 May	Sahir	Steamship	John White	West Cowes	United Kingdom	For Imperial Ottoman Government.
9 May	St. Clare	Barque		Miramichi	Canada	For private owner.
21 May	Joseph Nicholson	Schooner	Robert Thomas	Nevin	United Kingdom	For Messrs. Nicholson.
23 May	Corrèze	Sarthe-class horse transport	Arsenal de Rochefort	Rochefort	France	For French Navy.
23 May	Agnes Ann Wignall	Schooner	William Allsup	Preston	United Kingdom	For Mr. Wignall & others.
23 May	City of Perth	East Indiaman	Messrs. Charles Connell & Co.	Overnewton	United Kingdom	For Messrs. George Smith & Sons.
23 May	Henry E. Taylor	Steamship	Messrs. Bowdler & Chaffer	Seacombe	United Kingdom	For Aberystwyth & Cardigan Bay Steam Packet Company (Limited).
25 May	Monarch	Ironclad		Chatham Dockyard	United Kingdom	For Royal Navy.
25 May	R. & M. J. Charnley	Schooner	William Ashburner	Barrow-in-Furness	United Kingdom	For Thomas Ashburner & Co.
26 May	Juno	Paddle steamer	London and Glasgow Engineering and Iron Shipbuilding Co.	Glasgow	United Kingdom	For Bristol Steam Navigation Co.
27 May	Mary Davidson	Barque	Messrs. John Humphrye & Co.	Aberdeen	United Kingdom	For William Knox.
May	Carlin-Craig	Barque	Messrs. John Duthie & Sons	Footdee	United Kingdom	For Messrs. Adam & Co.
May	Don	Steamship	Messrs. Randolph, Elder & Co.	Dumbarton	United Kingdom	For D. R. Macgregor.
May	Janets & Ann	Schooner	Messrs. J. Fullarton & Co.	Paisley	United Kingdom	For Messrs. Waugh & Cameron.
May	Midge	Beacon-class gunvessel	Messrs. Randolph, Elder & Co.	Govan	United Kingdom	For Royal Navy.
May	Royal Arch	Barque	Sykes, Talbot & Sykes	Sunderland	United Kingdom	For Tillman & Co.
2 June	Birmah	Merchantman	Messrs. Dobie & Co.	Govan	United Kingdom	For William Ross, or James M. Wood.
2 June	Cornelia	Steam yacht	Messrs. Palmer & Co.	Jarrow	United Kingdom	For Earl Vane.
2 June	Magdala	Steamship	Messrs. C. & W. Earle	Hull	United Kingdom	For Messrs. James Moss & Co.
4 June	Abyssinia	Steamship	Messrs. William Denny & Bros	Dumbarton	United Kingdom	For British India Steam Navigation Company.
4 June	Clanranald	East Indiaman	Messrs. James & George Thomson	Govan	United Kingdom	For Messrs. A. G. Kidston & Co.
5 June	Celt	Steamship	Messrs. Wingate & Co.	Whiteinch	United Kingdom	For J. B. Sheriff.
5 June	The Lady Mary	Paddle steamer	Messrs. Blackwood & Gordon	Port Glasgow	United Kingdom	For Duke of Hamilton.
6 June	Astarte	Steamship	James Laing	Sunderland	United Kingdom	For Messrs. Hornstedt & Garthorne.
6 June	Biafra	Steamship	Messrs. Randolph, Elder & Co.	Govan	United Kingdom	For African Steamship Co, or African Mail Co.
6 June	Ferida	Schooner	Messrs. Robert Steele & Co.	Greenock	United Kingdom	For Marquess of Drogheda.
8 June	Syria	Sailing ship	William Pile	Sunderland	United Kingdom	For Nourse Line.
9 June	Malacca	Barque	Messrs. Alexander Stephen & Sons	Kelvinhaugh	United Kingdom	For Messrs. James Graham & Co.
9 June	Victoria	Paddle steamer	Messrs. Lewis & Stockwell	Blackwall	United Kingdom	For Fernandez y Ramos.
10 June	Kintyre	Steamship	Messrs. Robertson & Co.	Greenock	United Kingdom	For Campbeltown & Glasgow Steam Packet Co.
12 June	Annie	Yacht		Peel	Isle of Man	For Francis Wall.
20 June	Enköping	Passenger ferry	Oskarshamn Shipyard	Oskarshamn	Sweden	For Bockholmssunds Ångfartygsbolag.
22 June	Glenavon	East Indiaman	Messrs. Archibald M'Millan & Son	Dumbarton	United Kingdom	For Messrs. Allan C. Gow & Co.
22 June	Pert	Beacon-class gunboat	Messrs. J. Reid & Co.	Port Glasgow	United Kingdom	For Royal Navy.
23 June	Ben Nevis	Merchantman	Messrs. Barclay, Curle & Co.	Stobcross	United Kingdom	For Messrs. Watson Bros.
23 June	Star of Persia	Clipper	Harland & Wolff	Belfast	United Kingdom	For J. P. Corry & Co.
23 June	Westphalia	Steamship	Messrs. Caird & Co.	Greenock	United Kingdom	For Hamburg-Amerikanische Packetfahrt-Aktien-Gesellschaft.
24 June	Centurion	East Indiaman	Messrs. Alexander Stephen & Sons	Kelvinhaugh	United Kingdom	For James M'Kellar and others.
24 June	Phæton	Barque	Blumer & Co	Sunderland	United Kingdom	For F. & W. Ritson.
24 June	Water Lily	Barque	B. Hodgson	Sunderland	United Kingdom	For J. Adamson.
25 June	Assam	Steamship	Messrs. W. Denny & Bros.	Dumbarton	United Kingdom	For: Speculative build
25 June	Dalton	Barque	Messrs. Bowdler, Chaffer & Co.	Seacombe	United Kingdom	For Joseph Steel.
June	Annetta	Schooner	London and Glasgow Engineering and Iron Shipbuilding Co.	Glasgow	United Kingdom	For private owner.
June	Assyrian	Brig	Peter Austin	Sunderland	United Kingdom	For J. Dove.
June	Banshee	Steamship		River Clyde	United Kingdom	For private owner.
June	Bon-Espoir	Salvage vessel	M. Deschamps	La Villette	France	For M. Deschamps.
June	Boomerang	Schooner	Mr. Fyfe	Fairlie	United Kingdom	For G. Elder.
June	Corlie	Merchantman	Messrs. Robert Duncan & Co.	Port Glasgow	United Kingdom	For A. O Leitch & Muir.
June	Duna	Steamship	Messrs. Randolph, Elder & Co	Govan	United Kingdom	For private owner.
June	Flying Scud	Schooner	Mr. Fyfe	Fairlie	United Kingdom	For G. H. Dundas.
June	Hispania	Steamship	Messrs. Scott & Co.	Greenock	United Kingdom	For Messrs. Mories, Munro & Co.
June	Maori	Steamship	Messrs. Blackwood & Gordon	Port Glasgow	United Kingdom	For Mr. Orkney and others.
June	Pérséverance	Salvage vessel	M. Deschamps	La Villette	France	For M. Deschamps.
June	Ralston	Merchantman	Messrs. Robert Steele & Co.	Greenock	United Kingdom	For Messrs. James Richardson & Co.
June	Rooparell	East Indiaman	Messrs. L. Hill & Co.	Port Glasgow	United Kingdom	For Messrs. Patrick Playfair & Co.
June	San Joseph	Schooner	London and Glasgow Engineering and Iron Shipbuilding Co.	Glasgow	United Kingdom	For private owner.
June	St. Juan	Schooner	London and Glasgow Engineering and Iron Shipbuilding Co.	Glasgow	United Kingdom	For private owner.
4 July	Ho-so-Maru	Gunboat	Messrs. Hall	Aberdeen	United Kingdom	For Imperial Japanese Navy.
4 July	Samaria	Steamship	Messrs. J. & G. Thomson	Govan	United Kingdom	For Messrs. Burns & MacIver, or Cunard Line.
6 July	Ann Duthie	Chinaman	Messrs. Duthie & Co.	Footdee	United Kingdom	For William Duthie.
6 July	City of Rio de Janeiro	Steamship	Messrs. Randolph, Elder & Co.	Fairfield	United Kingdom	For Messrs. Peter Tait & Co.
6 July	Headquarters	Steamship	Messrs. Airken, Mansel & Co.	Whiteinch	United Kingdom	For William Laing.
7 July	Tiercel	Schooner	Messrs. Camper & Nicholson	Gosport	United Kingdom	For Cecil Duncombe.
10 July	River Indus	Merchantman	Messrs. Dobie & Co.	Govan	United Kingdom	For Messrs. Hargrove, Ferguson & Co.
11 July	Empress	Steamship	Messrs. C. & W. Earle	Hull	United Kingdom	For Messrs. Gee & Co.
15 July	Janet Court	East Indiaman	Messrs. Charles Connell & Co.	Kelvinhaugh	United Kingdom	For Messrs. William & Alfred Brown & Co.
15 July	The Devil	Schooner	Smith	Preston	United Kingdom	For T. Dawson.
16 July	Ethiopia	Steamship	Messrs. W. Denny & Bros.	Dumbarton	United Kingdom	For British India Steam Navigation Company.
16 July	Minerva	Merchantman	Messrs. Barclay, Curle & Co.	Whiteinch	United Kingdom	For Montreal Ocean Steamship Company, or Messrs. J. & A. Allen.
17 July	Congress	Contoocook-class screw sloop-of-war	Philadelphia Navy Yard	Philadelphia, Pennsylvania	United States	For United States Navy.
18 July	Skylark	Cutter	John White	Cowes	United Kingdom	For private owner.
20 July	Châteaurenault	Corvette	Augustin Normand	Havre de Grâce	France	For French Navy.
20 July	Colombo	Merchantman	Messrs. Robert Duncan & Co.	Port Glasgow	United Kingdom	For John Kerr.
20 July	Lady Heathcote	Barque	Ransom	Northam	United Kingdom	For Mr. Ransom.
21 July	Woodlawn	Schooner	Harland & Wolff	Belfast	United Kingdom	For S. Moreland.
21 July	Zenobia	Schooner			United Kingdom	For private owner
23 July	Red Tail	Schooner	Blundell & Mason	Runcorn	United Kingdom	For William Rigby.
25 July	Theopare, or Theophane	Clipper	Messrs. R. & J. Evans & Co	Liverpool	United Kingdom	For Messrs. Joseph Heap & Sons.
July	Fitzjames	Steamship	Messrs. Blackwood & Gordon	Port Glasgow	United Kingdom	For Messrs. Burrell & M'Laren.
July	Formosa	Steamship		River Clyde	United Kingdom	For private owner.
July	Gracie	Yacht	James E. Smith	Nyack, New York	United States	For Charles Ranlett Flint and Joseph P. Earle.
July	Hartfield	Merchantman	Messrs. Robert Steele & Co.	Greenock	United Kingdom	For Messrs. James Richardson & Co.
July	Jeypore	Merchantman	Messrs. John Reid & Co.	Port Glasgow	United Kingdom	For Messrs. M'Kinnon, Frew & Co.
July	Larnax	Barque	Robert Thompson Jr.	Sunderland	United Kingdom	For Smith & Co.
July	Livonia	Steamship		River Cluyde	United Kingdom	For private owner.
July	Lois	Barque	William Watson	Sunderland	United Kingdom	For L. Lewis.
July	Queen of the Belgians	Steamship	Messrs. W. Simons & Co.	Renfrew	United Kingdom	For private owner.
July	Rhein	Steamship	Messrs. Caird & Co.	Greenock	United Kingdom	For Norddeutsche Lloyd.
July	St. Kilda	Schooner	J. Fullerton & Co.	Paisley	United Kingdom	For A. G. Kidston & Co.
1 August	Hebe	Steam lighter	Harland & Wolff	Belfast	United Kingdom	For W. & J. Philips.
1 August	Horsa	Steamship	Messrs. Henderson, Coulborn & Co.	Renfrew	United Kingdom	For Aarhuus Steamship Company.
4 August	Mitford	Barque	Messrs. Hodgson & Soulby	Blyth	United Kingdom	For Messrs Edward Pape & partner.
5 August	Comadre	Merchantman	Messrs. Alexander Stephen & Sons	Kelvinhaugh	United Kingdom	For Messrs. T. H. Ismay & Co.
5 August	Racoon	Paddle steamer	Messrs. J. & G. Thomson	Govan	United Kingdom	For Messrs. Burns.
6 August	Assaye	Barque	Robert Steele & Co.	Greenock	United Kingdom	For J. and W. Steward.
6 August	Belle of Lagos	Barque	Messrs. Alexander Stephen & Sons	Kelvinhaugh	United Kingdom	For George Easter.
8 August	Lindormen	Monitor	Copenhagen Naval Dockyard	Copenhagen	Denmark	For Royal Danish Navy.
8 August	Samoa	Missionary ship	Messrs. Hall & Co.	Aberdeen	United Kingdom	For London Missionary Society.
15 August	Rouse Simmons	Schooner	Allen, McLelland & Co.	Milwaukee, Wisconsin	United States	For Allen, McLelland & Co.
17 August	Algoma	Sloop-of-War	Portsmouth Navy Yard	Portsmouth, New Hampshire	United States	For United States Navy
17 August	Maranon	Barque	Messrs. Dobie & Co.	Govan	United Kingdom	For Messrs. Donaldson Bros.
18 August	Hawk	Barque	Messrs. Reay & Naizby	Hylton	United Kingdom	For Messrs. Morgan & Co.
19 August	Childers	Barque	William Doxford	Pllion	United Kingdom	For Hughes & Co.
19 August	Thermopylæ	Merchantman	Messrs. Walter Hood & Co.	Aberdeen	United Kingdom	For Messrs. George Thompson & Co.
19 August	Hannah Hodgson	Barque	Richard Thompson	Deptford	United Kingdom	For Richard Hodgson.
20 August	Curlew	Plover-class gunvessel		Deptford Dockyard	United Kingdom	For Royal Navy.
20 August	Guinevère	Chinaman	Messrs. Randolph, Elder & Co.	Govan	United Kingdom	For John M'Cunn.
20 August	Hart	Beacon-class gunvessel	Messrs. J. & G. Thomson	Govan	United Kingdom	For Royal Navy.
22 August	Main	Steamship	Messrs. Caird & Co.	Greenock	United Kingdom	For Norddeutscher Lloyd.
28 August	Admiral Spiridov	Admiral Spiridov-class monitor	Semiannikov & Poletika Shipyard	Saint Petersburg	Russia	For Imperial Russian Navy.
Unknown date	British Workman	Schooner	William Allsup	Preston	United Kingdom	For Ashcroft & Co.
August	Flying Scud	Steamship	Messrs. Lawrence Hill & Co.	Port Glasgow	United Kingdom	For private owner.
August	Glenallan	East Indiaman	London and Glasgow Engineering and Iron Shipbuilding Co.	Govan	United Kingdom	For William Ross.
August	Lake Ontario	Merchantman	Messrs. Barclay, Curle & Co.	Whiteinch	United Kingdom	For Canada Shipping Co.
August	Leon	Steamship	Messrs. M'Nab & Co.	Greenock	United Kingdom	For private owner.
August	Loudoun Castle	East Indiaman	Messrs. Barclay, Curle & Co.	Stobcross	United Kingdom	For Glasgow and Asiatic Shipping Co.
August	Ocean Beauty	Barque	Robert Thompson Jr.	Sunderland	United Kingdom	For Maule & Co.
August	Zoula	Steamship	Messrs. Bowdler, Chaffer & Co.	Seacombe	United Kingdom	For Messrs T. Glyn & Son.
3 September	Clydevale	Merchantman	Messrs. Alexander Stephen & Sons	Kelvinhaugh	United Kingdom	For private owner.
3 September	Ganges	Steamship	London and Glasgow Engineering and Iron Shipbuilding Co.	Glasgow	United Kingdom	For Messrs. J. A. Dunkerley & Co.
4 September	Villareal	Steamship	Messrs. H. Murray & Co.	Port Glasgow	United Kingdom	For Mr. Lister.
5 September	Countess of Erne	Paddle steamer	Walpole, Webb & Bewley	Dublin	United Kingdom	For London and North Western Railway.
5 September	Rozelle	Clipper	Messrs. Robert Duncan & Co.	Port Glasgow	United Kingdom	For Robert Cuthbert.
10 September	Koh-i-Noor	Steamship	Archibald M'Millen	Dumbarton	United Kingdom	For Messrs. Robertson Bros.
14 September	Lillie Parsons	Schooner		Tonawanda, New York	United States	For private owner.
16 September	Spartan	Steamship	J. G. Lawrie	Whiteinch	United Kingdom	For Messrs. Spartali & Co.
17 September	Parsee	East Indiaman	Messrs. Robert Steele & Co.	Greenock	United Kingdom	For Messrs. J. & W. Stewart.
17 September	St. Kilda	Merchantman	Messrs. Alexander Stephen & Sons	Kelvinhaugh	United Kingdom	For Messrs. Sandbach, Tinne & Co.
19 September	Madeira	Paddle steamer	Liverpool Shipbuilding Co.	Liverpool	United Kingdom	For Campanhia de Flavia Amazonas.
19 September	Star of Greece	Sailing ship	Harland & Wolff	Belfast	United Kingdom	For J. P. Corry & Co.
19 September	Sultan	Brigantine	Messrs. White & Son	Portsmouth	United Kingdom	For J. T. Crampton.
19 September	Viscona do Arary	Paddle steamer	Liverpool Shipbuilding Co.	Liverpool	United Kingdom	For Campanhia de Flavia Amazonas.
22 September	Jane M'Coll	Schooner	M'Lay	Rothesay	United Kingdom	For John M'Coll.
23 September	Trinidad	East Indiaman	Messrs. A. M'Millan & Son	Dumbarton	United Kingdom	For John Kerr.
26 September	North Glen	Barque	Messrs. Dobie & Co.	Govan	United Kingdom	For Lawson Hodgson.
29 September	Carisbrooke Castle	East Indiaman	Messrs. Barclay, Curle & Co.	Stobcross	United Kingdom	For Messrs. D. Currie & Co.
29 September	Reward	Schooner	Messrs. Scott & Macgill	Bowling	United Kingdom	For D. M'Arthure and others.
September	Dunaverty	Steamship	Messrs. Robertson & Co.	Greenock	United Kingdom	For T. Brown.
September	Galatea	Merchantman	Messrs. Randolph, Elder & Co.	Fairfield	United Kingdom	For private owner.
September	Nereus	Full-rigged ship	Messrs. Bowdler, Chaffer & Co.	Seacombe	United Kingdom	For Messrs. W. J. Myers & co.
2 October	City of London	Merchantman	Messrs. Barclay, Curle & Co.	Stobcross	United Kingdom	For Messrs. George Smith & Sons.
3 October	Alice Davies	Merchantman	Messrs. R. and J. Evans & Co.	Liverpool	United Kingdom	For Messrs. D. W. Davies & Co. & friends.
3 October	Carrick Castle	Chinaman	Messrs. Randolph, Elder & Co.	Fairfield	United Kingdom	For Messrs. Thomas Skinner & Co.
3 October	County of Berwick	Merchantman	Messrs. Charles Connell & Co.	Overnewton	United Kingdom	For Messrs. R. & J. Craig.
3 October	Deccan	Steamship	Messrs. William Denny & Bros.	Dumbarton	United Kingdom	For Peninsular and Oriental Steam Navigation Company.
3 October	Ocean Queen	Steamship	Messrs. Henderson, Coulborn & Co.	Renfrew	United Kingdom	For private owner.
5 October	Scinde	Merchantman	Messrs. Robert Duncan & Co.	Port Glasgow	United Kingdom	For John Kerr.
10 October	Augusta	Barque	Messrs. Hill's	Wapping	United Kingdom	For Messrs. Daniel & Son.
10 October	Camel	Steamship	Messrs. Scott & Linton	Dumbarton	United Kingdom	For Messrs. John Bibby, Sons, & Co.
13 October	Admiral Chichagov	Admiral Spiridov-class monitor	Semiannikov & Poletika Shipyard	Saint Petersburg	Russia	For Imperial Russian Navy.
15 October	Maria Fidela	Barque	Blumer & Co.	Sunderland	United Kingdom	For C. Ansoleaga.
15 October	Océan	Océan-class ironclad		Brest	France	For French Navy.
15 October	River Krishna	Merchantman	Messrs. Dobie & Co.	Govan	United Kingdom	For Messrs. Hargrove, Fergusson & Co.
16 October	Montcalm	Alma-class ironclad		Rochefort	France	For French Navy.
17 October	Donau	Passenger and cargo ship	Messrs. Caird & Co.	Greenock	United Kingdom	For Norddeutscher Lloyd.
17 October	Gloria	Barque	William Doxford	Sunderland	United Kingdom	For Olano & Co.
17 October	Grecian	East Indiaman	Messrs. Scott & Co.	Greenock	United Kingdom	For William Orr.
17 October	Knockaninny	Steamship	Messrs. Walpole, Webb & Bewley	Dublin	United Kingdom	For J. G. V. Porter.
17 October	Nevada	Passenger ship	Messrs. C. M. Palmer & Co., Limited	Jarrow	United Kingdom	For private owner.
18 October	Elizabeth	Corvette		Danzig	Prussia	For Prussian Navy.
22 October	Ino	Steamship	Messrs. C. & W. Earle.	Hull	United Kingdom	For Messrs. Thomas Wilson, Sons, & Co.
30 October	Norna	Merchantman	Messrs. Barclay, Curle & Co.	Stobcross	United Kingdom	For Messrs. Hendry, Ferguson & Co.
30 October	Prussian	Steamship	Messrs. A. & J. Inglis	Pointhouse	United Kingdom	For Montreal Ocean Steamship Company.
30 October	Shuera	Steamship	Messrs. Scott & Co.	Greenock	United Kingdom	For private owner.
30 October	Tagus	Steamship	London and Glasgow Engineering and Iron Shipbuilding Company	Glasgow	United Kingdom	For Messrs. A. J. Dunkerley & Co.
30 October	Toscoff	Steamship	J. G. Lawrie	Whiteinch	United Kingdom	For Michael Spartali.
31 October	Alaska	Sloop-of-war	Charlestown Navy Yard	Boston, Massachusetts	United States	For United States Navy.
31 October	Prussian	Steamship	Messrs. A. & J. Inglis	Pointhouse	United Kingdom	For Montreal Ocean Steamship Company.
October	Belville	Brigantine	Pitblado	Perth	United Kingdom	For J. R. Pittendrigh.
October	Camel	Steamship	Messrs. Scott & Linton	Dumbarton	United Kingdom	For Messrs. J. Bibby, Sons, & Co.
October	Charlotte	Barque	Iliff & Mounsey	Sunderland	United Kingdom	For John Russell.
October	Excellent	Ketch	Philip Bellot	Gorey	(United Kingdom of Great Britain and Ireland) Jersey	For Elijah Seagers.
October	Ireshope	Full-rigged ship	Robert Thompson Jr.	Sunderland	United Kingdom	For Middle Dock Co.
October	La Escosesa	Merchantman		Dundee	United Kingdom	For Messrs. Balfour, Williamson & Co.
October	Ripple	Schooner			United Kingdom	For Messrs. Hargrove, Ferguson & Co.
2 November	Venus	Steamship	Messrs. William Denny & Bros.	Dumbarton	United Kingdom	For Österreichischer Lloyd.
3 November	Scythia	Full-rigged ship	Messrs. Bowdler, Chaffer & Co.	Seacombe	United Kingdom	For William Nichol.
4 November	Margaret Ann	Schooner	William Ashburner	Barrow-in-Furness	United Kingdom	For Thomas Ashburner.
4 November	Penang	Barque	Messrs. Dobie & Co.	Govan	United Kingdom	For private owner.
6 November	Archibald Fuller	Merchantman	Messrs. Evans & Co.	Liverpool	United Kingdom	For H. Coghill.
12 November	Inconstant	Frigate		Pembroke Dockyard	United Kingdom	For Royal Navy.
14 November	Sophia Jane	Brig	Robert Potts	Seaham	United Kingdom	For George Stavers.
14 November	Spartan	Eclipse-class sloop		Deptford Dockyard	United Kingdom	For Royal Navy.
16 November	Swallow	Plover-class gunvessel		Portsmouth Dockyard	United Kingdom	For Royal Navy.
24 November	Floral Star	Merchantman	Messrs. Stephen & Forbes	Peterhead	United Kingdom	For Messrs. Mitchell.
26 November	Luke Bruce	Barque	Messrs. Hall, Russell & Co.	Aberdeen	United Kingdom	For Messrs. Darbyshire & M'Kinnel.
30 November	Ibrahim	Frigate		La Seyne-sur-Mer	France	For Egyptian Navy.
November	Catalina	Barque	William Doxford	Sunderland	United Kingdom	For Ylurringa & Co.
November	Hawkesbury	Full-rigged ship	W. Pile & Co	Sunderland	United Kingdom	For Devitt & Moore.
November	Prairie Flower	Ketch	Charles W. Aubin	Jersey	(United Kingdom of Great Britain and Ireland) Jersey	For Henry Newman.
1 December	Growler	Beacon-class gunvessel	Lawrie	Whiteinch	United Kingdom	For Royal Navy.
1 December	Lake Erie	Merchantman	Messrs. Barclay, Curle & Co.		United Kingdom	For Canada Shipping Co.
1 December	The Lutterworth	East Indiaman	Messrs. Denton & Grey	Middleton	United Kingdom	For Messrs. Watts, Milburn & Co.
2 December	Cerberus	Cerberus-class breastwork monitor	Palmers Shipbuilding and Iron Company	Jarrow	United Kingdom	For Victorian Naval Forces.
2 December	City of Brooklyn	Cargo liner	Tod & McGregor	Glasgow	United Kingdom	For Inman Line.
2 December	Windhover	Clipper	Messrs. Charles Connell & Co.	Overnewton	United Kingdom	For James Findlay.
3 December	Dunfillan	Merchantman	Messrs. Aitken & Mansel	Whiteinch	United Kingdom	For William Ross.
4 December	Blanche and Louise	Barque	Messrs. Bowdler, Chaffer & Co.	Seacombe	United Kingdom	For MM. Lequellec & Bordes.
10 December	Advancement	Barque	Messrs. Dobie & Co.	Govan	United Kingdom	For Messrs. Doward, Dickson & Co.
14 December	Prins Oscar	Steamship	Messrs. Schlesinger, Davis & Co.	Wallsend	United Kingdom	For Messrs. Craven, Bott & Co.
15 December	Dacian	Steamship	Messrs. Robert Duncan & Co.	Port Glasgow	United Kingdom	For Anchor Line, or Robert Little.
16 December	Bonny	Steamship	Messrs. Randolph, Elder & Co	Fairfield	United Kingdom	For British and African Steam Navigation Company.
18 December	Ohio	Steamship	Messrs. Caird & Co.	Greenock	United Kingdom	For Norddeutscher Lloyd.
28 December	Cambiaggio	Steamship	Messrs. Scott & Co.	Greenock	United Kingdom	For private owner.
29 December	Doña María de Molina	Corvette	Arsenal de la Carraca	San Fernando, Cádiz	Spain	For Spanish Navy.
December	Mahgeda	Schooner	M'Lay	Rothesay	United Kingdom	For Robert Kirkwood.
December	Vesta	Steamship	Messrs. W. Denny & Bros.	Dumbarton	United Kingdom	For Österreichischer Lloyd.
December	Violantina	Merchantman		Varazza	Italy	For private owner.
Spring	River Tay	Whaler	Key	Kinghorn	United Kingdom	For Messrs. Gilroy.
Unknown date	Acorn	Barque	B. Hodgson	Sunderland	United Kingdom	For G. Longridge.
Unknown date	Aculeo	Merchantman	Messrs. T. Royden & Sons.	Liverpool	United Kingdom	For private owner.
Unknown date	Alcestis	Barque	Iliff & Mounsey	Sunderland	United Kingdom	For Penney & Co.
Unknown date	Alhonsine	Brig	Rawson & Watson	Sunderland	United Kingdom	For Lumsdon & Co.
Unknown date	Annie Florence	Barque	Robert Thompson & Sons	Sunderland	United Kingdom	For Barrass Bros.
Unknown date	Arcot	Full-rigged ship	W. Pile	Sunderland	United Kingdom	For G. D. Tyser.
Unknown date	Argonaut	Barque	W. Nicholson & Sons	Sunderland	United Kingdom	For Nicholson & Sons.
Unknown date	Asar-i Şevket	Asar-i Şevket-class ironclad	Forges et Chantiers de la Gironde	Lormont	France	For Ottoman Navy.
Unknown date	Asar-i Tevfik	Ironclad	Société Nouvelle des Forges et Chantiers de la Méditerranée	La Seyne-sur-Mer	France	For Ottoman Navy.
Unknown date	Austin Friars	Steamship	James Laing	Sunderland	United Kingdom	For Yoyng & Co.
Unknown date	Bengal	Full-rigged ship	Messrs. G. R. Clover & Co.	Birkenhead	United Kingdom	For Messrs. Clint & Co.
Unknown date	Ben More	Full-rigged ship	Iliff & Mounsey	Sunderland	United Kingdom	For R. Turcan.
Unknown date	Borrowdale	Full-rigged ship	Messrs. Potter & Co.	Liverpool	United Kingdom	For private owner.
Unknown date	Brightest Star	Barque	J. Barkes	Sunderland	United Kingdom	For Thickell & Co.
Unknown date	Brinkburn Priory	Barque	James Hardie	Sunderland	United Kingdom	For R. Avery.
Unknown date	British Empire	East Indiaman	Messrs. T. Royden & Sons.	Liverpool	United Kingdom	For private owner.
Unknown date	Bromsgrove	Steamship	T. R. Oswald	Sunderland	United Kingdom	For Hill & Co.
Unknown date	Callisto	Barque	W. Pile	Sunderland	United Kingdom	For John Hay.
Unknown date	Casablanca	Merchantman	Messrs. T. Royden & Sons.	Liverpool	United Kingdom	For private owner.
Unknown date	Cashmere	Full-rigged ship	T. R. Oswald	Sunderland	United Kingdom	For De Wolf & Co.
Unknown date	Cassandra	Barque	T. R. Oswald	Sunderland	United Kingdom	For Jones & Co.
Unknown date	Cerastes	Barque	W. Pile	Sunderland	United Kingdom	For John Hay.
Unknown date	Chacma	Barque	W. Pile, Hay & Co	Sunderland	United Kingdom	For John Hay.
Unknown date	Chin Chin	Barque	E. Spowers	Sunderland	United Kingdom	For "J. & A. Giro'nt".
Unknown date	Chinsura	Full-rigged ship	Messrs. G. R. Clover & Co.	Birkenhead	United Kingdom	For Messrs. T. & J. Brocklebank.
Unknown date	City of Halifax	Steamship	William Watson	Sunderland	United Kingdom	For W. Inman.
Unknown date	Clevedon	Merchantman	Messrs. R. and J. Evans & Co.	Liverpool	United Kingdom	For E. C. Friend & Co.
Unknown date	Columbine	Schooner	Laurence Wheatley	Sunderland	United Kingdom	For Storey & Co.
Unknown date	Concord	Barque	B. Hodgson	Sunderland	United Kingdom	For T. Hick.
Unknown date	Crofton	Barque	James Robinson	Sunderland	United Kingdom	For T. Knight.
Unknown date	Dacia	Steamship	James Laing	Sunderland	United Kingdom	For Norwood & Co.
Unknown date	Dacre	Barque	W. Pile	Sunderland	United Kingdom	For T. Nicholson.
Unknown date	Daisy	Brig	R. Pace	Sunderland	United Kingdom	For Potts & Co.
Unknown date	Decapolis	Barque	William Pile	Sunderland	United Kingdom	For T. B. Walker.
Unknown date	Demetrius	Brig	J. & J. Gibbon	Sunderland	United Kingdom	For Gardner & Co.
Unknown date	Deodarus	Barque	William Duthie Jr.	Aberdeen	United Kingdom	For Mr. Cappon and others.
Unknown date	Derwent	Barque	James Crown	Sunderland	United Kingdom	For R. Gayner.
Unknown date	D. McB. Park	Barque	Sykes, Talbot & Sykes	Sunderland	United Kingdom	For D. & W. Park.
Unknown date	Dorset	Schooner	Liddle & Sutcliffe	Sunderland	United Kingdom	For Miller & Co.
Unknown date	Dova	Merchantman	Messrs. T. Royden & Sons.	Liverpool	United Kingdom	For private owner.
Unknown date	Dove	Barque	J. Lister	Sunderland	United Kingdom	For J. Dove.
Unknown date	Doxford	Barque	William Doxford	Sunderland	United Kingdom	For H. Hughes.
Unknown date	Duchess of Sutherland	Paddle steamer	A. Leslie and Company	Hebburn	United Kingdom	For London and North Western Railway.
Unknown date	Edith Warran	East Indiaman	Messrs. G. R. Clover & Co.	Birkenhead	United Kingdom	For Messrs. George Warran & Co.
Unknown date	El Capitan	Ferry	Patrick Tiernan	San Francisco, California	United States	For Central Pacific Railroad.
Unknown date	Enterprise	Steamship	Robert J. Blyth	Great Yarmouth	United Kingdom	For Robert John Blythgh.
Unknown date	E. R. J.	Schooner	Liddle & Sutcliffe	Sunderland	United Kingdom	For R. Iliff.
Unknown date	Essayons	Dredger	Atlantic Works	East Boston, Massachusetts	United States	For United States Army Corps of Engineers.
Unknown date	Euromedha	Barque	Allan, Band & Co	Sunderland	United Kingdom	For J. Alexander.
Unknown date	Evangeline	Barque	W. Adamson	Sunderland	United Kingdom	For Adamson & Co.
Unknown date	Excellent	Barque	J. Davison	Sunderland	United Kingdom	For Anderson & Co.
Unknown date	Faith	Fishing trawler	John Banks Jr.	Kilpin Pike	United Kingdom	For William H. Brusey.
Unknown date	Ferndale	Barque	James Hardie	Sunderland	United Kingdom	For R. Porrett.
Unknown date	Flodden	Barque	William Pickersgill	Sunderland	United Kingdom	For A. Watts.
Unknown date	Francis Thorp	Clipper			United Kingdom	For Black Ball Line.
Unknown date	Frank Wilson	Barque	T. R. Oswald	Sunderland	United Kingdom	For Wilson & Co.
Unknown date	Ganymede	Barque	William Doxford	Sunderland	United Kingdom	For Jackson & Co.
Unknown date	Gateforth	Merchantman	J. Maddison	Sunderland	United Kingdom	For private owner
Unknown date	General Havelock	Steamship	James Laing	Sunderland	United Kingdom	For R. M. Hudson.
Unknown date	Glencorse	Merchantman	Messrs. T. Royden & Sons.	Liverpool	United Kingdom	For private owner.
Unknown date	Golden Russett	Barque	Iliff & Mounsey	Sunderland	United Kingdom	For Brown & Co.
Unknown date	Good Hope	Steamship	James Laing	Sunderland	United Kingdom	For Cape of Good Hope Steamship Co.
Unknown date	Goodwood	Barque	James Robinson	Sunderland	United Kingdom	For W. Atkinson.
Unknown date	Guiding Star	Barque	W. H. Pearson	Sunderland	United Kingdom	For J. Hopper.
Unknown date	Haddon Hall	East Indiaman	Messrs. T. Royden & Sons.	Liverpool	United Kingdom	For private owner.
Unknown date	Hampshire	Barque	Gibbon & Nichol	Sunderland	United Kingdom	For T. Bull.
Unknown date	Hannah & Mary	Barque	George Barker	Sunderland	United Kingdom	For Rankn & Co.
Unknown date	Hawk	Barque	R. H. Potts & Bros.	Sunderland	United Kingdom	For Potts & Co.
Unknown date	Henry Warrington	Barge	J. M. Jones	Detroit, Michigan	United States	For Redmond & John Prendiville, and Thomas Brown.
Unknown date	Her Majesty	Full-rigged ship	J. Lister	Sunderland	United Kingdom	For J. Lister.
Unknown date	Hifse Rahman	Monitor			Ottoman Empire	For Ottoman Navy.
Unknown date	Hooghly	Full-rigged ship	T. R. Oswald	Sunderland	United Kingdom	For G. Stanton.
Unknown date	Hope	Brigantine	Apps	Bosham	United Kingdom	For William Apps.
Unknown date	Unnamed	Sloop of war		Aberdeen	United Kingdom	For Chōshū Domain. Later named Hōshō Maru.
Unknown date	Hylton Castle	Barque	W. Briggs	Sunderland	United Kingdom	For Briggs & Sons.
Unknown date	Imogen	Barque	W. Nicholson	Sunderland	United Kingdom	For Robson & Co.
Unknown date	Insulane	Steamship	Messrs. C. & W. Earle	Hull	United Kingdom	For Messrs. Bailey & Leetham.
Unknown date	Isabel	Smack	Allan, Band & Co	Sunderland	United Kingdom	For Mr. Fortescue.
Unknown date	Isabel	Barque	J. Gill	Sunderland	United Kingdom	For Sr. de Arrindga.
Unknown date	Isabella	Brig	E. Spowers	Sunderland	United Kingdom	For A. Woodhouse.
Unknown date	Ismyr	Merchantman	Messrs. T. Royden & Sons.	Liverpool	United Kingdom	For private owner.
Unknown date	Ivanhoe	Steamship	W. Bell	Sunderland	United Kingdom	For Kelso & Bell.
Unknown date	James Ovington	Merchantman	J. Hardie	Sunderland	United Kingdom	For private owner.
Unknown date	James Wilson	Barque	T. R. Oswald	Sunderland	United Kingdom	For Wilson & Co.
Unknown date	Jane Ann	Schooner	J. Maddison	Sunderland	United Kingdom	For J. Maddison.
Unknown date	John George	Barque	J. & E. Lumsden	Pallion	United Kingdom	For Doxford & Co.
Unknown date	John O'Gaunt	Full-rigged ship	Messrs. G. R. Clover & Co.	Birkenhead	United Kingdom	For James Beazley.
Unknown date	John Ritson	Barque	Mills	Sunderland	United Kingdom	For Ritson & Co.
Unknown date	Josephine	Paddle steamer	Harlan and Hollingsworth	Wilmington, Delaware	United States	For Louisiana and Texas Railroad and Steamship Company.
Unknown date	Kenosha	Sloop-of-war		New York Navy Yard	United States	For United States Navy.
Unknown date	Kestrel	Steamship	Messrs. Earle's	Hull	United Kingdom	For private owner.
Unknown date	Kingdom of Belgium	Barque	Iliff & Mounsey	Sunderland	United Kingdom	For Gosman & Co.
Unknown date	Lady Aberdour	Brig	L. Wheatley	Sunderland	United Kingdom	For Mr. Wilkinson.
Unknown date	Lady Lampson	Barque	Mills	Sunderland	United Kingdom	For Hudson's Bay Company.
Unknown date	Lady Turner	Barque	William Watson	Sunderland	United Kingdom	For B. Balkwill & Co.
Unknown date	L'Allegro	Merchantman	Messrs. T. Royden & Sons.	Liverpool	United Kingdom	For private owner.
Unknown date	Lance	Fishing trawler	John Barter	Brixham	United Kingdom	For John Barter and others.
Unknown date	Langley	Steamship	James Laing	Sunderland	United Kingdom	For H. Morton.
Unknown date	Larkspur	Barque	James Laing	Sunderland	United Kingdom	For R. Gayner.
Unknown date	L'Esperance	Barque	J. & J. Gibbon	Sunderland	United Kingdom	For W. Tweddell.
Unknown date	Lone Star	Paddle steamer		Lyons, Iowa	United States	For private owner.
Unknown date	Lord Byron	Merchantman	T. Metcalf	Sunderland	United Kingdom	For private owner.
Unknown date	Lord Laurence	East Indiaman	Messrs. T. Royden & Sons.	Liverpool	United Kingdom	For private owner.
Unknown date	Louise	Barque	Iliff & Mounsey	Sunderland	United Kingdom	For M. Viale.
Unknown date	Lufti Djelil	Monitor			Ottoman Empire	For Ottoman Navy.
Unknown date	Magdala	Barque	G. Short	Sunderland	United Kingdom	For W. Watson.
Unknown date	Magdala	Barque	George Barker	Sunderland	United Kingdom	For R. Wilson.
Unknown date	Mariannina Galatola	Barque	James Crown	Sunderland	United Kingdom	For A. Galatola.
Unknown date	Mariner	Barque	Robert Thompson & Sons	Sunderland	United Kingdom	For Mr. Legender.
Unknown date	Mary	Barque	Robert Thompson & Sons	Sunderland	United Kingdom	For T. Hays.
Unknown date	M. C. Nelson	Merchantman	Messrs. T. Royden & Sons.	Liverpool	United Kingdom	For private owner.
Unknown date	Mercia	Barque	James Robinson	Pallion	United Kingdom	For T. Gibson.
Unknown date	Milbanke	Steamship	T. R. Oswald	Sunderland	United Kingdom	For private owner.
Unknown date	Mullany	Merchantman	Messrs. T. Royden & Sons.	Liverpool	United Kingdom	For private owner.
Unknown date	Mjølner	John Ericsson-class monitor	Motala Verkstad	Norrköping	Norway	For Royal Norwegian Navy.
Unknown date	Navis	Brig	J. & J. Gibbon	Sunderland	United Kingdom	For J. Smith.
Unknown date	Naworth Castle	Barque	T. Metcalf	Sunderland	United Kingdom	For G. Watson.
Unknown date	Necm-i Şevket	Asar-i Şevket-class ironclad	Forges et Chantiers de la Gironde	Lormont	France	For Ottoman Navy.
Unknown date	Nestor	Steamship	James Laing	Sunderland	United Kingdom	For R. Pope.
Unknown date	Niger	Steamship	Iliff & Mounsey	Sunderland	United Kingdom	For private owner.
Unknown date	Nile	Steamship	Iliff & Mounsey	Sunderland	United Kingdom	For private owner.
Unknown date	North	Full-rigged ship	Messrs. G. R. Clover & Co.	Birkenhead	United Kingdom	For Messrs. Conbrough, Boyd & Co.
Unknown date	North Star	Icebreaking narrowboat	Birmingham Canal Navigations Co.	Ocker Hill	United Kingdom	For Birmingham Canal Navigations Co.
Unknown date	Oceana	Barque	J. Hardie	Sunderland	United Kingdom	For W. Sanderson.
Unknown date	Olive Branch	Barque	W. Briggs	Sunderland	United Kingdom	For Mr. Hicks.
Unknown date	Ottercaps	Barque	J. Gill	Sunderland	United Kingdom	For G. Fenwick.
Unknown date	Passover	Barque	W. Pickersgill	Sunderland	United Kingdom	For J. Douthwaite.
Unknown date	Pendragon	East Indiaman	Messrs. T. Royden & Sons.	Liverpool	United Kingdom	For private owner.
Unknown date	Pera	Steamship	James Laing	Sunderland	United Kingdom	For J. Laing.
Unknown date	P. Foccas	Brig	Metcalf	Sunderland	United Kingdom	For P. Vagliano.
Unknown date	Polyxena	Barque	T. R. Oswald	Sunderland	United Kingdom	For Jones & Co.
Unknown date	Queen	Barque	G. & J. Mills	Sunderland	United Kingdom	For W. Kish.
Unknown date	Quevedo	Steamship	Bowdler, Chaffer & Co.	Seacombe	United Kingdom	For Serapio, Acebel y Compagnia.
Unknown date	Rhone	Steamship	W. Pile	Sunderland	United Kingdom	For Ryde & Co.
Unknown date	Richard Cobden	Steamship	W. Pile	Sunderland	United Kingdom	For Ryde & Co.
Unknown date	Richard Hodgson	Barque	W. Briggs	Sunderland	United Kingdom	For R. Hodgson.
Unknown date	River Jumaa	Barque	Liverpool Shipbuilding Co.	Liverpool	United Kingdom	For Messrs. Hargrave, Ferguson & Co.
Unknown date	Robert Fletcher	Barque	James Robinson	Sunderland	United Kingdom	For Mears & Co.
Unknown date	Robert Hine	Barque	J. Davison	Sunderland	United Kingdom	For Nicholson & Son.
Unknown date	Ruffine	Barque	Rawson & Watson	Sunderland	United Kingdom	For Lumsdon & Co.
Unknown date	Saint Kilda	Clipper	Messrs. Stephen & Son	Glasgow	United Kingdom	For private owner.
Unknown date	San Juan	Brig	W. Richardson	Sunderland	United Kingdom	For T. Riley.
Unknown date	Sarah	Barque	John Thompson	Sunderland	United Kingdom	For Culliford & Co.
Unknown date	Sarah Jane	Barque	G. Bartram	South Hylton	United Kingdom	For R. Humble.
Unknown date	Sea Foam	Barque	William Pickersgill	Sunderland	United Kingdom	For Mr. Thompson Jr.
Unknown date	Shepperton	Steamship	James Laing	Sunderland	United Kingdom	For R. Young.
Unknown date	Silverlands	Schooner	Alfred Simey & Co.	Sunderland	United Kingdom	For Cleugh & Co.
Unknown date	Sköld	Monitor	Bergsund	Stockholm	Sweden	For Royal Swedish Navy.
Unknown date	Somerville	Brig	Liddle & Sutcliffe	Sunderland	United Kingdom	For Mr. Somerville.
Unknown date	Stanley Castle	Barque	Richard Thompson	Sunderland	United Kingdom	For Porter & Co.
Unknown date	St. Helens	Barque	G. Short	Sunderland	United Kingdom	For J. Pegg.
Unknown date	St. Monan	East Indiaman	Messrs. T. Royden & Sons.	Liverpool	United Kingdom	For private owner.
Unknown date	Storm Prince	Tug	John Batchelor, or Batchelor Bros.	Cardiff	United Kingdom	For private owner.
Unknown date	Syringa	Barque	J. Gill	Sunderland	United Kingdom	For P. Hick.
Unknown date	Tarsus	Barque	T. Metcalf	Sunderland	United Kingdom	For G. & J. Robinson.
Unknown date	Teviot Dale	Barque	John Thompson	Sunderland	United Kingdom	For W. Graham.
Unknown date	Thermopylae	Clipper	Walter Hood & Co	Aberdeen	United Kingdom	For Aberdeen Line.
Unknown date	Times	Barque	William Doxford	Sunderland	United Kingdom	For G. Gardner.
Unknown date	Trowbridge	Full-rigged ship	T. R. Oswald	Sunderland	United Kingdom	For G. Stanton.
Unknown date	Tynedale	Steamship	James Laing	Sunderland	United Kingdom	For J. Laing.
Unknown date	Un'yō	Gunboat	Alexander Hall and Sons	Aberdeen	United Kingdom	For Imperial Japanese Navy.
Unknown date	Valkyrien	Barque	W. Adamson	Sunderland	United Kingdom	For W. Adamson.
Unknown date	Veronica	Barque	Robert Thompson & Sons	Sunderland	United Kingdom	For T. White
Unknown date	Vida	Merchantman	Messrs. T. Royden & Sons.	Liverpool	United Kingdom	For private owner.
Unknown date	Vivat Veritas	Barque	Reay & Naisby	Sunderland	United Kingdom	For Crosby & Co.
Unknown date	Waldridge	Steamship	James Laing	Sunderland	United Kingdom	For Clark & Co.
Unknown date	Wave	Steamship	Allen & Wharton	Pembroke Dock	United Kingdom	For Richard Allen.
Unknown date	Windermere	Barque	Robert Thompson Jr.	Sunderland	United Kingdom	For J. & H. Scott.
Unknown date	Zoe	Steamship	T. R. Oswald	Sunderland	United Kingdom	For private owner.
Unknown date	Zorilla	Steamship	Bowdler, Chaffer & Co.	Seacombe	United Kingdom	For E. D. Glynn & Son.
