= List of shipwrecks in September 1875 =

The list of shipwrecks in September 1875 includes ships sunk, foundered, grounded, or otherwise lost during September 1875.

== 1 September ==
List of shipwrecks: 1 September 1875
Ship	State	Description
Tom, and Vixen	United Kingdom	Vixen ran into the smack Tom at Newport, Monmouthshire and both vessels ran aground.
HMS Vanguard	Royal Navy	An 1887 illustration of HMS Vanguard (right) sinking. HMS Iron Duke is at left. The Audacious-class central battery ironclad sank after a collision with the central battery ironclad HMS Iron Duke (Royal Navy) off the Kish Bank, in the Irish Sea. All 360 crew were rescued by HMS Iron Duke. HMS Vanguard was on a voyage from Kingstown, County Dublin to Queenstown, County Cork.

== 2 September ==
List of shipwrecks: 2 September 1875
Ship	State	Description
Florentine	United Kingdom	The ship was sighted off Angier, Netherlands East Indies whilst on a voyage from "Passaroeang", Netherlands East Indies to an English port. No further trace, presumed foundered with the loss of all hands.

== 3 September ==
List of shipwrecks: 3 September 1875
Ship	State	Description
Louth	United Kingdom	The ship sank in the Humber.
Maria Lowther	United Kingdom	The schooner was driven ashore at St. Bees, Cumberland. Her crew were rescued. She was on a voyage from Whitehaven, Cumberland to Newport, Monmouthshire.
Scots Greys	United Kingdom	The steamship was damaged by fire at Liverpool, Lancashire.

== 4 September ==
List of shipwrecks: 4 September 1875
Ship	State	Description
Elida	Sweden	The ship ran aground off "Kronburg". She was on a voyage from Sundsvall to Newhaven, Sussex, United Kingdom. She was refloated with assistance and resumed her voyage.
Imod	United Kingdom	The brig ran aground at Staithes, Yorkshire. She was refloated and resumed her voyage.
Rhea	Germany	The barque was driven ashore on Skagen, Denmark. She was on a voyage from Newcastle upon Tyne, Northumberland, United Kingdom to Memel.
Viken	Norway	The brig was driven ashore and wrecked on the Mull of Galloway, Wigtownshire, United Kingdom. She was on a voyage from Whitehaven, Cumberland, United Kingdom to Skellefteå, Sweden.

== 5 September ==
List of shipwrecks: 5 September 1875
Ship	State	Description
Carrie	Brazil	The barquentine foundered in the Atlantic Ocean. Her crew were rescued by Neni (Flag unknown). Carrie was on a voyage from Liverpool, Lancashire, United Kingdom to Rio de Janeiro.

== 6 September ==
List of shipwrecks: 6 September 1875
Ship	State	Description
Charlotte	Portugal	The brig foundered. Her crew were rescued. She was on a voyage from Lisbon to Riga, Russia.
James Paton	United Kingdom	The ship was wrecked at Yokohama, Japan.
Unity	United Kingdom	The brigantine sprang a leak and sank 5 nautical miles (9.3 km) off St Ann's Head, Pembrokeshire. She was on a voyage from Porthcawl, Glamorgan to Cork.

== 7 September ==
List of shipwrecks: 7 September 1875
Ship	State	Description
Cambridgeshire	United Kingdom	The ship was wrecked on Clarke Island, or Night Island, Tasmania. Her crew were rescued. She was on a voyage from London to Sydney, New South Wales.
Margaret Elizabeth	United Kingdom	The ship ran aground on the North Virgins, off Hogland, Russia. She was on a voyage from West Hartlepool, County Durham to Kronstadt, Russia. She was refloated and completed her voyage.
Montana	United Kingdom	The steamship ran aground at New York, United States. She was on a voyage from New York to Liverpool, Lancashire.
Rona	United Kingdom	The steamship ran aground in the Urr Water.
Unity	United Kingdom	The ship foundered 5 nautical miles (9.3 km) off St Ann's Head, Pembrokeshire. Her crew survived. She was on a voyage from Porthcawl, Glamorgan to Cork.
Vikingen	Germany	The brig ran aground at Swansea, Glamorgan. She was on a voyage from Swansea to Hamburg. She was refloated the next day.
Volna	Imperial Russian Navy	The steam yacht was wrecked on a reef in the Biorkesund, in the Gulf of Finland.

== 8 September ==
List of shipwrecks: 8 September 1875
Ship	State	Description
Athlete	Flag unknown	1875 Indianola hurricane: The schooner foundered in the Atlantic Ocean (24°25′N 58°00′W).
Edith	United Kingdom	The paddle steamer collided with the paddle steamer Duchess of Sutherland (United Kingdom) and sank off Holyhead, Anglesey with the loss of two of her crew. Survivors were rescued by Duchess of Sutherland, boats from Connaught and Nestor (both United Kingdom) and the Holyhead Lifeboat. Edith was on a voyage from Holyhead to Greenore, County Wexford. She was refloated on 4 December 1877. Subsequently rebuilt and returned to service.
Maria	Germany	The ship was abandoned in the North Sea. Her crew were rescued by Gesina (Germany). Maria was on a voyage from Fraserburgh, Aberdeenshire, United Kingdom to Stettin.
Marie	United Kingdom	The schooner collided with Nicoline (Norway) and sank in the North Sea with the loss of two of her crew. Survivors were rescued by Nicoline. Marie was on a voyage from Portsoy, Aberdeenshire to Stettin.
Shannon	United Kingdom	The steamship was wrecked on the Pedro Cays, 80 nautical miles (150 km) south south west of Port Royal, Jamaica. All on board were rescued by HMS Dryad and HMS Heron (both Royal Navy). Shannon was on a voyage from Colón, United States of Colombia to Kingston, Jamaica.

== 9 September ==
List of shipwrecks: 9 September 1875
Ship	State	Description
Anna	Norway	1875 Indianola hurricane: The barque capsized in the Atlantic Ocean. Her crew were taken off the wreck by Mary Varwell (United Kingdom) on 11 September. Anna was on a voyage from Tupilco, Mexico to Queenstown, County Cork, United Kingdom.
Arthur L.	United States	1875 Indianola hurricane: The schooner was driven ashore on Barbados.
Devonshire	Bermuda	1875 Indianola hurricane: The brig was driven ashore at Kingstown, Saint Vincent.
Esther	United Kingdom	The full-rigged ship ran aground off Gotland, Sweden. She was on a voyage from Rochester, Kent to Gävle, Sweden.
George E. Dale	United States	1875 Indianola hurricane: The brig was driven ashore on Barbados.
H. M. Norris	United States	1875 Indianola hurricane: The brig was driven ashore on Barbados.
Minnie Miller	United States	1875 Indianola hurricane: The ship was driven ashore on Barbados.
Tanner	United States	The bark stranded south of Milwaukee, Wisconsin in a gale. She sank in 20 feet (6.1 m) of water, later breaking up. Her captain drowned. The rest of her crew was rescued.
Water Lily	Canada	1875 Indianola hurricane: The schooner was driven ashore at Kingstown.

== 10 September ==
List of shipwrecks: 10 September 1875
Ship	State	Description
Christine Janet	United Kingdom	The ship was driven ashore at Ardglass, County Down. She was refloated and found to be leaky.
Equinox	United States	The steamship foundered in Lake Michigan with the loss of all 22 people on board.
Friedrich	Germany	The lighter ran aground at Vegesack and sprang a leak.
Phoenix	Netherlands	The ship sprang a leak and was beached at Grimsby, Lincolnshire, United Kingdom.
Serene	United States	1875 Indianola hurricane: The schooner departed from Navassa Island for Wilmington, North Carolina. No further trace, presumed foundered with the loss of all hands.
Sidon	United Kingdom	The ship collided with the steamship Mersey (United Kingdom) off Penarth, Glamorgan and was severely damaged. She was on a voyage from Arkhangelsk, Russia to Cardiff, Glamorgan.

== 11 September ==
List of shipwrecks: 11 September 1875
Ship	State	Description
Alert	New Zealand	The 43-ton ketch stranded at the mouth of the Patea River, New Zealand, and became a total wreck.
Armolican	France	The brig was abandoned in the Atlantic Ocean. Her crew were rescued by Actai (flag unknown).
Bartele	Flag unknown	1875 Indianola hurricane: The ship was wrecked in a hurricane at Aux Cayes, Haiti.
Chilton	Canada	1875 Indianola hurricane: The brigantine was damaged at sea in a hurricane. She put in to Falmouth, Jamaica.
Cleopatra	Sweden	The ship ran aground on the Kentish Knock. She was abandoned the next day. Her crew were rescued by the smack Victory (United Kingdom). Cleopatra was on a voyage from Skutskär to Bordeaux, Gironde, France. She was later refloated and towed in to Harwich, Essex, United Kingdom.
Empress	Canada	1875 Indianola hurricane: The brigantine was damaged at sea in a hurricane. She put in to Falmouth, Jamaica.
Freya	Flag unknown	1875 Inidanola hurricane: The ship was wrecked in a hurricane at Aux Cayes. Her crew were rescued.
Jessie Scott	United Kingdom	The full-rigged ship was wrecked off Cape Horn, Chile. Her crew were rescued by the barque Padre Francesco (Italy). Jessie Scott was on a voyage from Liverpool to Guayaquil, Ecuador.
J. W. Spencer	United States	1875 Indianola hurricane: The brig departed from Navassa Island for Charleston, South Carolina. No further trace, presumed foundered with the loss of all hands.
Kohla	Germany	1875 Indianola hurricane: The ship was wrecked in a hurricane at Aux Cayes.
Margaretha	Flag unknown	1875 Indianola hurricane: The ship was wrecked in a hurricane at Aux Cayes.
Uncle Joe	United Kingdom	The ship was abandoned in the South Atlantic (45°50′S 38°44′W). Her crew were rescued by Lord Dalhousie (United Kingdom). Uncle Joe was on a voyage from Saint John's, Newfoundland Colony to Liverpool, Lancashire.

== 12 September ==
List of shipwrecks: 12 September 1875
Ship	State	Description
Aquila	United Kingdom	The steamship collided with a smack and sank in the North Sea 22 nautical miles (41 km) south south east of Spurn Point, Yorkshire. Her crew were rescued by the steamship Northumbria (United Kingdom). Aquila was on a voyage from Sunderland, County Durham to London.
Bessie	United Kingdom	The schooner sank at Smyrna, Ottoman Empire. She was refloated in late September.
Brisk	United Kingdom	1875 Indianola hurricane: The schooner was damaged in a hurricane at Kingston, Jamaica.
Cara	United Kingdom	1875 Indianola hurricane The steamship was damaged in a hurricane with some loss of life.
Chieftain	United Kingdom	1875 Indianola hurricane: The brig was damaged in a hurricane at Kingston.
Codfish	Leeward Islands	1875 Indianola hurricane: The ship sank in a hurricane at Martinique with the loss of all twenty crew.
Devonshire	United Kingdom	1875 Indianola hurricane: The brig was driven ashore in a hurricane at Jamaica.
Diver	United Kingdom	The smack was driven ashore on the Hurst Spit, Hampshire. She was on a voyage from Portsmouth to Christchurch, Hampshire.
Giulio Solari	Italy	1875 Indianola hurricane: The brigantine foundered in a hurricane with the loss of all twenty crew. She was on a voyage from Kingston, Jamaica to Genoa.
Growler	United Kingdom	The fishing smack was run down and sunk in the North Sea 10 nautical miles (19 km) off Saltfleet, Lincolnshire by the steamship Aquila (United Kingdom).
H. M. Morris	United Kingdom	1875 Indianola hurricane: The brig was driven ashore in a hurricane at Barbados.
Lizzie Virden	Flag unknown	1875 Indianola hurricane: The brig was wrecked in a hurricane at Kingston, Jamaica.
Marie	Spain	1875 Indianola hurricane: The ship was damaged in a hurricane at Saint Thomas, Virgin Islands.
Messenger	United Kingdom	1875 Indianola hurricane: The brig was damaged in a hurricane off Alta Velo Island, Dominican Republic. She was on a voyage from Antwerp, Belgium to Matanzas, Cuba. She consequently put in to Jamaica.
Rhondda	United Kingdom	The schooner ran aground off the Dutch coast. She was on a voyage from Newcastle upon Tyne, Northumberland to Rotterdam, South Holland, Netherlands.
Toronto	United Kingdom	1875 Indianola hurricane: The barque was driven out to sea from Navassa Island. She was subsequently abandoned in the Atlantic Ocean off Cuba before 24 September. A crew member was rescued from a boat in the Gulf of Mexico on 26 October. She was subsequently towed in to "Portillo", Cuba by a Spanish Navy gunboat. She was condemned.
Tres Sobrinas	Spain	1875 Indianola hurricane: The ship was damaged in a hurricane at Saint Thomas. She was on a voyage from Liverpool, Lancashire, United Kingdom to Puerto Rico.
Wellington	United States	1875 Indianola hurricane: The schooner was driven ashore on the coast of Jamaica.

== 13 September ==
List of shipwrecks: 13 September 1875
Ship	State	Description
Annie	United Kingdom	The yacht was driven ashore at Salthouse, Norfolk.
Caribbean	United Kingdom	1875 Indianola hurricane: The steamship was damaged in a hurricane at Saint Thomas, Virgin Islands with the loss of three of her crew.
Culalie	France	The schooner collided with the steamship Carron (United Kingdom) and sank in the North Sea off the Souter Lighthouse, County Durham, United Kingdom. Her crew were rescued by Carron. Culalie was on a voyage from West Wemyss, Fife, United Kingdom to Gravelines, Nord.
Deerhound	United Kingdom	The clipper foundered in the South China Sea. Her crew were rescued. She was on a voyage from Shanghai, China to London.
Helen	United Kingdom	The steam yacht ran aground on a rock north of Easdale, Argyllshire. She was on a voyage from Oban, Argyllshire to Dublin.
Herzog Ernst, and Sir James C. Stephenson	Germany; United Kingdom	The barque was run into by the steamship Sir James C. Stephenson and sank off the Eddystone Rocks, Devon, United Kingdom. Her crew were rescued by Sir James C. Stephenson. Herzog Ernst was on a voyage from Bahia, Brazil to Bremen. Sir James C. Stephenson was on a voyage from London to Bombay, India. She put in to Plymouth, Devon severely damaged at the bows and severely leaky.
Maggie Armstrong	United Kingdom	The ship capsized at Liverpool, Lancashire.
Mendoza	United States	The steamship foundered in Lake Michigan with the loss of thirteen of the twenty people on board.
Tweed	Bermuda	1875 Indianola hurricane: The schooner was wrecked in a hurricane off Water Cay.
William Schröder	Germany	The ship departed from Copenhagen, Denmark for Southampton, Hampshire, United Kingdom. No further trace, presumed foundered with the loss of all hands.

== 14 September ==
List of shipwrecks: 14 September 1875
Ship	State	Description
Banner	United Kingdom	The steamship sank at Lagos, Lagos Colony.
Sunda	United Kingdom	The steamship ran aground on a rock north of Turnabout Island. She was beached on "Statien Island". Her passengers were taken off. She was on a voyage from Hong Kong to Yokohama, Japan. Sunda had been refloated by 18 October.
Tawera	New Zealand	The 55-ton schooner was discovered wrecked and stranded to the north of the entrance to the Kaipara Harbour, with no sign of crew on board. The bodies of two of the five crew washed up several days later. Tawera had sailed from Foxton and was en route to Kaipara Harbour.

== 15 September ==
List of shipwrecks: 15 September 1875
Ship	State	Description
Eastham	United Kingdom	The barque was abandoned in the Atlantic Ocean with the loss of a crew member. Survivors were rescued by the barque Macedonia (United Kingdom). Eastham was on a voyage from Quebec City, Canada to Greenock, Renfrewshire.
Hannah Heres	Netherlands	The brig sprang a leak and was abandoned in the North Sea. Her crew were rescued.
Mesudiye	Ottoman Navy	The ironclad ran aground in the River Medway. She was refloated and taken in to Chatham, Kent, United Kingdom.
Onkataia	Denmark	The schooner sprang a leak and was abandoned by her crew, who were rescued by the steamship Cornet (Netherlands). Onkahaia was on a voyage from Newcastle upon Tyne, Northumberland, United Kingdom to Flensburg, Germany.
Temeraria	Flag unknown	The ship ran aground on "Daldai Noss". She was on a voyage from Gioia Tauro, Italy to Kronstadt, Russia.
West Wemyss	France	The schooner was run down and sunk by the steamship Cannon (United Kingdom).

== 16 September ==
List of shipwrecks: 16 September 1875
Ship	State	Description
Axel	Russia	The ship was driven ashore at Zoutelande, Zeeland, Netherlands. She was on a voyage from Baltic Port to Terneuzen, Zeeland.
City of Waco	United States	The steamship ran aground on the French Reef. Her passengers were taken off. She was on a voyage from New York to Galveston, Texas. She was refloated on 18 September and taken in to Key West, Florida.
Delhi	United Kingdom	The steamship ran aground in the Elkat Boghaz Pass. Her passengers were taken off. She was on a voyage from Brindisi, Italy to Alexandria, Egypt. She was refloated.
Duo Amenzio	Italy	The ship was driven ashore and wrecked at "Onrust", Zeeland. She was on a voyage from Constantinople, Ottoman Empire to Rotterdam, South Holland, Netherlands.
Joseph Marianne	France	The ship was driven ashore and wrecked on Färö, Sweden. She was on a voyage from Härnösand, Sweden to a French port.
Sarah Richardon	United Kingdom	The ship ran aground on Hammond's Knoll, in the North Sea off the coast of Norfolk and sank. She was on a voyage from Sunderland, County Durham to Genoa, Italy.
Ten Brothers	United Kingdom	The ship ran aground off the Formby Lightship ( Trinity House), in Liverpool Bay. She was on a voyage from Dublin to Liverpool, Lancashire. She was refloated and taken in to Liverpool in a leaky condition.

== 17 September ==
List of shipwrecks: 17 September 1875
Ship	State	Description
Beardstown	United States	1875 Indianola hurricane: The steamship was driven ashore and wrecked in a hurricane at Galveston, Texas with some loss of life.
Chilianwallah	United Kingdom	The ship was wrecked on Anticosti Island, Nova Scotia, Canada. Her crew were rescued. She was on a voyage from London to Quebec City, Canada.
Comet	United States	1875 Indianola hurricane: The schooner was driven ashore at Indianola, Texas.
Edward McDowell	United States	1875 Indianola hurricane: The barque was driven ashore on Pelican Island, Texas in a hurricane. She was refloated in mid-October.
Era	Germany	1875 Indianola hurricane: The brigantine was driven ashore in a hurricane at Key West, Florida. She was on a voyage from Minatitlán, Mexico to Hamburg.
Gwen Jones	United Kingdom	The ship sprang a leak and was beached at New Ferry, Cheshire. She was on a voyage from Hamburg, Germany to Runcorn, Cheshire.
Memory	United Kingdom	1875 Indianola hurricane: The brigantine was driven ashore at Galveston.
Rebecca	United States	1875 Indianola hurricane: The schooner was driven ashore at Aransas Pass, Texas.
Rescue	United States	1875 Indianola hurricane: The schooner was driven ashore at Aransas Pass.
Thistle	United States	1875 Indianola hurricane: The schooner was driven ashore at Galveston.
Windsor	United Kingdom	The ship ran aground on the Holleplaat. She was on a voyage from Leith, Lothian to Antwerp, Belgium. She was refloated.

== 18 September ==
List of shipwrecks: 18 September 1875
Ship	State	Description
Adelaide	United States	1875 Indianola hurricane: The schooner was driven ashore at Wilcox's Point, Texas.
Amos Houston	United States	1875 Indianola hurricane: The schooner was driven ashore at Shoal Point, Texas.
Christiana	United States	1875 Indianola hurricane: The schooner was driven ashore at Edward's Point, Texas. She was a total loss.
Falcon	United States	1875 Indianola hurricane: The brig was damaged in a hurricane off Navassa Island. She was on a voyage from Azua, Dominican Republic to Boston, Massachusetts. She was subsequently towed in to St. Jago de Cuba, Cuba by the barque Marguerite (France).
George and Susan	United Kingdom	The ship ran aground on the Scar Shoal. She was on a voyage from Briton Ferry, Glamorgan to Newry, County Antrim. She was refloated.
Ida P.	Austria-Hungary	The ship ran aground in the River Parrett.
Marcia Greenleaf	United States	1875 Indianola hurricane: The ship was driven ashore in the Southwest Pass. She was on a voyage from Reval, Russia to a port in Louisiana.
May Queen	United States	1875 Indianola hurricane: The barque was driven ashore at Shoal Point.
Minerva	United States	1875 Indianola hurricane: The schooner was driven ashore at Shoal Point.
Northumbria	United Kingdom	The steamship was driven ashore in the River Thames at Blackwall, Middlesex.
Western Empire	United Kingdom	1875 Indianola hurricane: The ship was abandoned in the Gulf of Mexico 80 nautical miles (150 km) north west of the Dry Tortugas (28°53′N 87°54′W) with the loss of ten of her 24 crew. She was on a voyage from Pensacola, Florida, United States to Grimsby, Lincolnshire. She came ashore in Indian River in November.

== 19 September ==
List of shipwrecks: 19 September 1875
Ship	State	Description
Anna Helena	Germany	The brigantine was driven ashore and wrecked at Puerto Plata, Dominican Republic.
Iliad	United Kingdom	The fishing smack departed from Brightlingsea, Essex for Inverness. No further trace, presumed foundered with the loss of all hands.
What's That To You	United Kingdom	The fishing smack was run down and sunk 20 nautical miles (37 km) north by east of Spurn Head, Yorkshire by the steamship J. E. McConnell (United Kingdom). Her five crew were rescued by J. E. McConnell.

== 20 September ==
List of shipwrecks: 20 September 1875
Ship	State	Description
Fox	Norway	The barque was driven ashore at Landskrona, Sweden. She was on a voyage from Narva, Russia to Toulon, Var, France. She was refloated.
Sitka	United States	The schooner was driven ashore and wrecked near Wrangell in Southeast Alaska.
Vidar	Sweden	The steamship was driven ashore and wrecked at Terschelling, the Netherlands. She was on a voyage from Kronstadt, Russian Empire to Rotterdam. The crew members were rescued.

== 22 September ==
List of shipwrecks: 22 September 1875
Ship	State	Description
Tigress	Canada	The ship sprang a leak and foundered. She was on a voyage from Cow Bay, Nova Scotia to Montreal, Quebec.

== 23 September ==
List of shipwrecks: 23 September 1875
Ship	State	Description
Era	United Kingdom	The ship was wrecked on the Manquesas Key. Her crew were rescued. She was on a voyage from Mexico to Hamburg, Germany.
Familien	Norway	The ship ran aground in the Thyboroøn Channel and was wrecked. She was on a voyage from Newcastle upon Tyne, Northumberland, United Kingdom to the Ljumfjord.
Hedwig	Germany	The ship was driven ashore and wrecked at Dungeness, Kent, United Kingdom. Her crew were rescued. She was on a voyage from Stettin to Bordeaux, Gironde, France. She was refloated on 29 September and towed in to Dover, Kent.
Familien	Denmark	The ship ran aground and was wrecked off Thyborøn. She was on a voyage from Newcastle upon Tyne, Northumberland to the Limfjord.

== 24 September ==
List of shipwrecks: 24 September 1875
Ship	State	Description
Cathrina	Russia	The schooner ran aground and wrecked at the mouth of the River Tay. Her eight crew were rescued by the Broughty Ferry Lifeboat. She was on a voyage from Kronstadt to Montrose, Forfarshire, United Kingdom.
Ceres	United Kingdom	The brig was driven ashore at Ardwell, Wigtownshire. Her crew were rescued. She was on a voyage from Dublin to Whitehaven, Cumberland.
Clio	Flag unknown	The brig was driven ashore and wrecked at Garwick, north of Laxey, Isle of Man with the loss of two of her seven crew. She was on a voyage from Greenock, Renfrewshire to Liverpool, Lancashire, United Kingdom.
Fuduskie	Germany	The ship ran aground in the Surrey Docks, London, United Kingdom. She was refloated the next day.
John Coggin	United Kingdom	The brig was run into and sunk at South Shields, County Durham by the steamship Mercator (United Kingdom). Her four crew survived. John Coggin was on a voyage from the River Tyne to London.
Marcia C. Day	United States	The ship ran aground at New York.
Mary	United Kingdom	The schooner was driven ashore at South Shields. She was on a voyage from Sunderland, County Durham to the River Tyne. She was refloated with the assistance of a tug and taken in to South Shields.
Mette	Denmark	The ship departed from the River Tyne for Korsør. No further trace, presumed foundered with the loss of all hands.
Moderator	United Kingdom	The sloop was driven ashore at Blue Anchor, Somerset. She was on a voyage from Bridgwater, Somerset to Swansea, Glamorgan.
Montague	United Kingdom	The steamship ran aground at Wexford. Her 32 crew were rescued by the Wexford Lifeboat Ethel Eveleen ( Royal National Lifeboat Institution). Montague was on a voyage from Wexford to Liverpool. She was refloated on 13 October and taken in to Wexford.
Rose of Sharon	United Kingdom	The ship ran aground on the Maplin Sand, in the North Sea off the coast of Essex. She was on a voyage from Kronstadt, Russia to London. She was refloated with assistance on 27 September and taken in to Gravesend, Kent in a waterlogged condition.
Sylph	United Kingdom	The ketch ran aground at Ryde, Isle of Wight. She was on a voyage from Poole, Dorset to Hull, Yorkshire.
Vertrouwen	Netherlands	The ship was driven ashore at "Norlev", Denmark. Her crew were rescued. She was on a voyage from Königsberg, Germany to Zaandam, North Holland.
Unnamed	Flag unknown	The barque ran aground on the North Sand, off the north Kent coast.
Unnamed	Flag unknown	The barque was run into by the steamship Palmyra (United Kingdom) and sank at Liverpool, Lancashire, United Kingdom.

== 25 September ==
List of shipwrecks: 25 September 1875
Ship	State	Description
Active	United Kingdom	The ship was driven ashore and wrecked on Öland, Sweden. She was on a voyage from Skellefteå, Sweden to Antwerp, Belgium.
Francisco Saretio	Italy	The ship was abandoned in the Atlantic Ocean (37°12′N 12°45′W). Her crew were rescued by David Malcolm (United Kingdom). Francisco Sarieto was on a voyage from Banana, Africa to Marseille, Bouches-du-Rhône, France.
Hebe	United Kingdom	The schooner departed from Dublin for Glasgow, Renfrewshire. No further trace, presumed foundered with the loss of all hands.
Khandeish	United Kingdom	The ship was wrecked on Oeno Island, Pitcairn Islands. Her crew were rescued. She was on a voyage from San Francisco, California to Liverpool, Lancashire.
Queen of the East	United Kingdom	The ship ran aground in the Hooghly River. She was on a voyage from Liverpool to Calcutta, India. She was refloated the next day and taken in to Calcutta.
Telegraaf	Netherlands	The steamship foundered. She was on a voyage from Rotterdam, South Holland to Antwerp.
Tempo	United Kingdom	The brig was driven ashore at Cape Sestos, Ottoman Empire. She was on a voyage from Odesa, Russia to Falmouth, Cornwall. She was refloated and resumed her voyage.

== 26 September ==
List of shipwrecks: 26 September 1875
Ship	State	Description
Albinus	United Kingdom	The barque sprang a leak and was beached at The Mumbles, Glamorgan.
Fidelity	United Kingdom	The ship departed from King's Lynn, Norfolk for Invergordon, Ross-shire. No further trace, presumed foundered with the loss of all four crew.
Francesco Seccho	Italy	The barque was abandoned in the Atlantic Ocean. Her crew were rescued by the barque David Malcolm (United Kingdom). Francesco Seccho was on a voyage from Panama City, United States of Colombia to the west coast of Africa and Marseille, Bouches-du-Rhône, France.
Hope	United Kingdom	The schooner was driven ashore at Traeth Castellmerch, Caernarfonshire. She was on a voyage from Dublin to Port Madoc, Caernarfonshire.
Immacolata	Italy	The brigantine ran aground on the Doom Bar and sank. Her eight crew were rescued by the Padstow Lifeboat. Immacolata was on a voyage from Corfu Greece to Falmouth, Cornwall, United Kingdom.
La Plata	France	The brigantine was wrecked at the mouth of the River Mersey with the loss of all on board. She was on a voyage from Waterford to Liverpool, Lancashire, United Kingdom.
Leitrim	United Kingdom	The schooner was driven ashore and wrecked at Holyhead, Anglesey. Her crew were rescued. She was on a voyage from Waterford to Garston, Lancashire.
Martha	United Kingdom	The schooner was driven ashore and wrecked at Nefyn, Caernarfonshire. Her crew were rescued.
Mary	United Kingdom	The schooner sank at "Kinsembo", Africa.
Mary Reynolds	United Kingdom	The schooner ran aground and capsized at Caernarfon with the loss of all three or six crew. She was on a voyage from Dublin to Caernarfon.
Monarch	United Kingdom	The Mersey Flat sank on the Lavan Sands. The sole crew member on board was rescued by the Beaumaris Lifeboat. She was on a voyage from Port Dinorwic, Caernarfonshire to Fleetwood, Lancashire. She was refloated on 28 September and towed in to Beaumaris, Anglesey.
Norge	Norway	The ship foundered in the Pacific Ocean with the loss of two of her crew. She was on a voyage from Callao, Peru to Lobos, Argentina.
Paquete do Terra Nova	Spain	The brigantine was driven ashore and wrecked at Tacumshane, County Wexford, United Kingdom. All 10 persons on board were rescued by the Carnsore lifeboat. She was on a voyage from Havana, Cuba to Greenock, Renfrewshire, United Kingdom.
Kung Oscar II	Sweden	The steamship collided with the steamship Adler (Germany) and sank off the Spurn Lightship ( Trinity House) with the loss of fourteen of the 21 people on board. Survivors were rescued by Adler. Kung Oscar II was on a voyage from Grimsby, Lincolnshire, United Kingdom to Malmö.
Rachel	United Kingdom	The schooner was severely damaged by fire at South Shields, County Durham.
Venus	United Kingdom	The ship ran aground in the Eider. She was on a voyage from Grays Thurrock, Essex to "Pallude".
Walter Austen	United Kingdom	The smack was destroyed by fire in the Dogger Bank. Her five crew were rescued by the smack Martha (United Kingdom).
Unnamed	United Kingdom	The Mersey Flat sank off Tranmere, Cheshire.

== 27 September ==
List of shipwrecks: 27 September 1875
Ship	State	Description
Bessie Lewis	United Kingdom	The smack was driven ashore and wrecked at Lemvig, Denmark. Her crew were rescued.
Collector	United Kingdom	The smack was abandoned in the Dogger Bank. Her crew were rescued by Galatea (United Kingdom).
Despatch	United Kingdom	The schooner was driven ashore and wrecked at Port Logan, Wigtownshire. She was on a voyage from Newry, County Antrim to Runcorn, Cheshire.
Elizabeth	United Kingdom	The ship was driven ashore and wrecked at Groomsport, County Down. She was on a voyage from Dublin to Whitehaven, Cumberland.
Elizabeth	United Kingdom	The Mersey Flat sank in the River Mersey at Liverpool, Lancashire.
Ellen Southard	United States	The wreck of Ellen Southard The full-rigged ship was driven ashore and wrecked between Crosby and Formby, Lancashire with the loss of eight of the 31 people on board. Survivors were rescued by the New Brighton Lifeboat. She was on a voyage from Saint John, New Brunswick, Canada to Liverpool.
Endeavour	United Kingdom	The tug was run into by the steamship Dolphin (United Kingdom) and was beached at Gravesend, Kent, or in The Downs.
Energy	United Kingdom	The schooner was destroyed by fire at Lamlash, Isle of Arran. Her crew were rescued. She was on a voyage from Larne, County Antrim to Glasgow, Renfrewshire.
Fay	United Kingdom	The coaster foundered south of the Isle of Arran with the loss of two of her four crew.
Gertrude	United Kingdom	The ship was driven ashore at Paraíba, Brazil. She was on a voyage from Cardiff, Glamorgan to Santos, Brazil. She was a total loss.
Ivea	Norway	The ship was driven ashore at Pill, Somerset. She was on a voyage from Onega, Russia to Bristol, Gloucestershire, United Kingdom. She was refloated the next day.
Louise Charlotte	Russia	The ship, a brig or a steamship capsized in the North Sea 120 nautical miles (220 km) east of Inchcape, Fife, United Kingdom with the loss of two of her nine crew. Survivors were rescued on 29 September by the steamship Una (United Kingdom). Louise Charlotte was on a voyage from Riga to Alloa, Clackmannanshire, United Kingdom.
Mary Ellen	United Kingdom	The ship was driven ashore at Audresselles, Pas-de-Calais, France. Her crew were rescued. She was on a voyage from Bridgwater, Somerset to London.
Mona	United Kingdom	The Mersey Flat sank in the Menai Strait. The sole crew member on board was rescued.
Prince of Wales	United Kingdom	The Mersey Flat sank in the River Mersey at Liverpool.
Try	United Kingdom	The pilot boat sprang a leak and foundered off Nash Point, Glamorgan. All four people on board were rescued by the tug Refuge (United Kingdom).
W. K. Chapman	United Kingdom	The schooner was driven ashore and wrecked at Fleetwood, Lancashire with the loss of all hands.
Liverpool Lifeboat	United Kingdom	The lifeboat capsized after rescuing eighteen people from Ellen Southard (United States) with the loss of ten of the 32 people on board. Survivors were rescued by the New Brighton Lifeboat.
Two unnamed vessels	United Kingdom	The Mersey Flats sank in the Queen's Dock, Liverpool.
Unnamed	United Kingdom	The Mersey Flat sank in the Harrington Dock, Liverpool.

== 28 September ==
List of shipwrecks: 28 September 1875
Ship	State	Description
Derwent	United Kingdom	The ship was wrecked off Java, Netherlands East Indies. Shew as on a voyage from Rio de Janeiro, Brazil to Anjer, Netherlands East Indies.
Dispatch	United Kingdom	The schooner was driven ashore and sank at Port Logan, Wigtownshire. Her crew were rescued.
Emilie	Germany	The ship was driven ashore at Svinør, Norway. She was on a voyage from Anclam to London, United Kingdom.
Guide	United Kingdom	The ship was driven ashore and wrecked near Gothenburg, Sweden. Her crew were rescued. She was on a voyage from Newcastle upon Tyne, Northumberland to Norrköping, Sweden.
Isabella	United Kingdom	The ship was abandoned at sea. Her crew were rescued.
Jane	Sweden	The brig was abandoned in the North Sea (56°28′N 2°40′E). Her crew were rescued by A. Anders (Flag unknown).
Thornhill	United Kingdom	The ship was driven ashore at Bootle, Lancashire. She was on a voyage from Quebec City, Canada to Liverpool, Lancashire. She was refloated and taken in to Egremont, Lancashire.
Ville de Bilbao	Spain	The steamship sank at Brest, Finistère, France. Her crew were rescued. She was on a voyage from Liverpool to Havana, Cuba
Wilhelm	Germany	The schooner was abandoned in the North Sea off Flamborough Head, Yorkshire, United Kingdom. Her crew were rescued by the smack Young Henry (United Kingdom). Wilhelm was on a voyage from Ghent, East Flanders, Belgium to Sunderland, County Durham, United Kingdom.
William McGilvery	United Kingdom	The ship was driven ashore near Bootle. She was on a voyage from Saint John, New Brunswick, Canada to Liverpool. She was refloated and taken in to Liverpool.

== 29 September ==
List of shipwrecks: 29 September 1875
Ship	State	Description
Annie	Netherlands	The ship was run down and sunk. Her crew were rescued by Aura (Denmark). Annie was on a voyage from Ystad, Sweden to Schiedam, South Holland.
Artery	United Kingdom	The smack departed from the North Sea fishing grounds for Great Yarmouth, Norfolk. No further trace, presumed foundered with the loss of all seven crew.
Clyde	United Kingdom	The smack foundered off Nash Point, Glamorgan with the loss of her captain. She was on a voyage from Newport, Monmouthshire to Malpas and/or Padstow, Cornwall.
Consul	United Kingdom	The ship foundered with the loss of five of her crew. She was on a voyage from Hartlepool, County Durham to Stettin, Germany.
Engelina	Netherlands	The ship foundered. Her crew were rescued. She was on a voyage from Anclam, Germany to London, United Kingdom.
Eureka	United Kingdom	The schooner was driven ashore and wrecked near Farsund, Denmark. Her crew were rescued by rocket apparatus. She was on a voyage from Königsberg, Germany to Dundee, Forfarshire.
Frankfurt Hall	United Kingdom	The ship was damaged by fire at Valparaíso, Chile.
Harmonie	Denmark	The barque was abandoned in the North Sea. Her crew were rescued by Margarethe (United Kingdom). Harmonie was on a voyage from London to Copenhagen.
Hercules	Flag unknown	The ship was driven ashore. She was on a voyage from a Baltic port to Caen, Calvados, France.
Jungfrau Lucia	Germany	The ship ran aground on the Rhinplatte. She was on a voyage from Hartlepool to Glückstadt. She was refloated on 7 October and taken in to Glückstadt.
Luther	Sweden	The ship was wrecked at Thisted, Denmark. Her crew were rescued. She was on a voyage from Newcastle upon Tyne, Northumberland, United Kingdom to Trelleborg.
Mary Ann	United Kingdom	The ship was abandoned at sea. Her crew were rescued.
Morning Star	United Kingdom	The ship foundered with the loss of all hands.
Uzella	United Kingdom	The schooner was abandoned in the North Sea. Her crew were rescued. She was on a voyage from Cuxhaven, Germany to Newcastle upon Tyne.
William Fraser	United Kingdom	The brigantine sprang a leak and foundered off Robin Hoods Bay, Yorkshire. Her crew were rescued by the brig Violet (United Kingdom). William Fraser was on a voyage from Ipswich, Suffolk to Newcastle upon Tyne, Northumberland.

== 30 September ==
List of shipwrecks: 30 September 1875
Ship	State	Description
Ariel	United Kingdom	The steamship was wrecked at Red Bay, Newfoundland Colony.
Aubra	United Kingdom	The schooner was towed in to the River Tyne in a waterlogged condition by the smack Whimper (United Kingdom).
Bar Lightship	Trinity House	The lightship was run into by Cartvale (United Kingdom) and was severely damaged. Her crew were rescued by Cartvale. The Bar Lightship was towed in to Liverpool, Lancashire for repairs.
Champion	United Kingdom	The smack was driven ashore at Donna Nook, Lincolnshire.
Ellida	Norway	The ship was towed in to Kristiansand, Norway in a waterlogged condition by the steamship Dannebrog (Denmark). Ellida was on a voyage from Riga, Russia to Antwerp, Belgium.
Elvira	Italy	The ship was driven ashore at Waterford, United Kingdom. She was on a voyage from Liverpool, Lancashire, United Kingdom to Smyrna, Ottoman Empire. She sank on 2 October.
Falken	Norway	The ship was abandoned in the North Sea. Her crew were rescued. Falken was on a voyage from Hartlepool, County Durham, United Kingdom to Königsberg, Germany. She was towed in to Gothenburg in a derelict condition.
Flora	United Kingdom	The ship was wrecked. Her crew were rescued. She was on a voyage from Danzig to a British port.
Flying Foam	United Kingdom	The ship ran aground on the Caral Aracaju, off the coast of Brazil. She was refloated and taken in to Pernambuco, Brazil in a leaky condition.
Howard	United Kingdom	The ship was driven ashore at Punta Mala, Spain. She was on a voyage from Sherbro Island, Sierra Leone to Marseille, Bouches-du-Rhône, France. She was later refloated and taken in to Gibraltar.
Jane	United Kingdom	The schooner was driven ashore. She was on a voyage from Stettin, Germany to Leith, Lothian. She was refloated and taken in to Kristiansand in a leaky condition.
John and Ann	United Kingdom	The Mersey Flat sprang a leak and sank at Liverpool. Her five crew survived.
Marie	Germany	The derelict ship was driven ashore and wrecked at Lemvig, Denmark. She was on a voyage from Riga to Geestemünde.
Mary	United Kingdom	The ship was driven ashore and wrecked on Langlade Island, Nova Scotia, Canada. She was on a voyage from Richibucto, New Brunswick, Canada to Liverpool.
Mimer	Sweden	The ship was wrecked. She was on a voyage from Piteå to Hartlepool.
President	United Kingdom	The barque was wrecked on the Haaks Bank, in the North Sea off the Dutch coast. She was on a voyage from New York, United States to Hamburg, Germany.
Speculation	United Kingdom	The schooner foundered off Cape St. Vincent, Portugal. Her crew were rescued by Alma (Flag unknown). Speculation was on a voyage from Huelva, Spain to Amsterdam, North Holland, Netherlands.

== Unknown date ==
List of shipwrecks: Unknown date in September 1875
Ship	State	Description
Active	France	The barque was wrecked with the loss of three lives.
Adelaide	Canada	The schooner was abandoned in the Atlantic Ocean before 28 September.
Agamemnon	United Kingdom	The ship ran aground at Quebec City, Canada. She was refloated.
Agnes	Flag unknown	1875 Indianola hurricane: The schooner was driven ashore at Aux Cayes, Haiti.
Alsvid	Norway	The ship ran aground on a reef off Domesnes, Courland Governorate. She was refloated and taken in to Bolderāja, Russia in a leaky condition.
Amelie	Canada	The brigantine was wrecked at Charleston, South Carolina, United States. Her crew were rescued.
Amity	United Kingdom	The barque wrecked on Bawean Island, Netherlands East Indies before 16 September. Her crew were rescued She was on a voyage from Yloilo, Spanish East Indies to a Channel port.
Ann Louise	Flag unknown	1875 Indianola hurricane: The schooner was driven ashore and wrecked at Saint Kitts.
Arthur	United Kingdom	The brigantine foundered in the North Sea. Her crew were rescued.
Australia	United Kingdom	1875 Indianola hurricane: The steamship was driven ashore in the San Bernard River south of Galveston, Texas, United States between 16 and 19 September. Her crew survived.
City of York	United Kingdom	The ship was destroyed by fire at Portland, Oregon, United States.
Dagmar	United Kingdom	The ship was driven ashore on "Orleans Island". She was on a voyage from Quebec City to Plymouth, Devon. She was refloated with assistance.
Deodata	Norway	The brig was abandoned off the coast of Norway before 29 September.
Due Amici	Italy	The barque was driven ashore at Zierikzee, Zeeland, Netherlands. She was on a voyage from Constantinople, Ottoman Empire to Rotterdam, South Holland, Netherlands. She was refloated and taken in to Zeirikzee.
Ellida	United Kingdom	The ship foundered in the North Sea. Her crew were rescued by Olga (Flag unknown).
Error	Flag unknown	1875 Indianola hurricane: The brig was driven ashore on the Marquesas Keys.
Gaston Hermine	France	1875 Indianola hurricane: The brigantine was damaged in a hurricane with the loss of a crew member. She put in to Martinique.
Helena Burchard	Germany	The steamship ran aground off Hittarp, Sweden. She was on a voyage from Middlesbrough, Yorkshire, United Kingdom to Danzig. She was refloated and resumed her voyage.
Hewson	United Kingdom	The ship ran aground on the Storplatte, in the Elbe and was wrecked.
Jane McRea	United Kingdom	The schooner ran aground off Warrenpoint, County Antrim. She was on a voyage from Troon, Ayrshire to Newry, County Antrim. She was refloated.
J. Truman	Flag unknown	1875 Indianola hurricane: The schooner was driven ashore 15 nautical miles (28 km) west of the Sabine Pass.
Leonie	France	The ship foundered with the loss of two of her crew.
Lily	United Kingdom	The ketch was abandoned off Ilfracombe, Devon. Her crew were rescued.
Lizzie Ives	United States	1875 Indianola hurricane: The schooner was abandoned in the Atlantic Oceam (18°50′N 75°50′W) before 16 September. She was on a voyage from New York to Aux Cayes.
Lottie Klota	United States	The schooner caught fire at Buenos Aires, Argentina and was scuttled.
Louise	United Kingdom	The ship was driven ashore on White Island, Quebec. She was on a voyage from Quebec City to London.
Lucy Richmond	United Kingdom	The ship sprang a leak and was beached at Grimsby, Lincolnshire.
March Hare	(Dominion of Newfoundland) Newfoundland Colony	The ship was wrecked before 9 September. She was on a voyage from Saint John's to a port in Labrador.
Margaret Powrie	United Kingdom	Reported on 30 September to have run aground on the Vineta Reef, near Koserow and also refloated undamaged. She was on a voyage from Newcastle upon Tyne to Swinemünde, Germany.
Martha Laving	Norway	The ship capsized. Her crew were rescued by the galiot Dwina (Russia). Martha Laving was on a voyage from Vardø to Tromsø.
Nathalie	France	The ship was abandoned in the North Sea. She was subsequently towed in to Hellevoetsluis, Zeeland.
Noemi	France	The brig ran aground on the Lillegrund, in the Baltic Sea. She was on a voyage from Sicily, Italy to Kronstadt, Russia. She was refloated and towed in to Copenhagen, Denmark.
Nordkyn	United Kingdom	1875 Indianola hurricane: The barque was wrecked on the Coffin Patches. She was on a voyage from "Tobasco" to Queenstown, County Cork.
Ouse	United Kingdom	The ship ran aground on the Brizens, off Land's End, Cornwall.
Pelican State	United States	1875 Indianola hurricane: The steamship was wrecked in Sabine Lake between 16 and 19 September. All on board were rescued.
Pharsalia	United States	The fishing schooner sailed from Gloucester, Massachusetts on 15 September and vanished. Lost with all 12 hands.
Roland	France	The brig was abandoned in the Atlantic Ocean before 23 September.
Tevere	United Kingdom	The barque was driven ashore at Bridgwater, Somerset.
Shediac	Canada	The ship was driven ashore at Cape Tormentine, New Brunswick.
Siam	United Kingdom	The ship was driven ashore at Matane, Quebec. Her crew were rescuedf.
St. Vincent	United Kingdom	The sloop foundered in a hurricane at Martinique.
Susannah	Leeward Islands	The ship was abandoned in a hurricane at Martinique. Her crew were rescued.
Susannah Cuthbert	New South Wales	The steamship was wrecked off Jenkins Point. She was on a voyage from Catherine Hill Bay to Sydney.
Wideawake	United Kingdom	The ship capsized and sank off the coast of India with the loss of at least 21 lives. Nine crew took to a raft; six survivors were rescued six days later by the steamship Africa (United Kingdom). Wideawake was on a voyage from Jeddah, Hejaz Vilayet to Alleppey, India.
Wilhelmine	United Kingdom	The ship was driven ashore at St. Nicholas. She was on a voyage from Cowes, Isle of Wight to Quebec City. She was later refloated and towed in to Quebec City, where she arrived on 17 September. She was consequently condemned.
William and Ann	United Kingdom	The fishing smack foundered off Varne Sands, in the English Channel with the loss of all five crew.
William and Jane	United Kingdom	The ship was driven ashore at Egremont, Lancashire. She was refloated and towed in to Birkenhead, Cheshire in a leaky condition.
Zephyr	Flag unknown	1875 Indianola hurricane: The schooner was driven ashore and wrecked on Saint Kitts.
Two unnamed vessels	Flags unknown	1875 Indianola hurricane: The ships were driven ashore at Aux Cayes.
Several unnamed vessels	Haiti	1875 Indianola hurricane: The coasters were driven ashore at Aux Cayes.
