= List of shipwrecks in May 1887 =

The list of shipwrecks in May 1887 includes ships sunk, foundered, grounded, or otherwise lost during May 1887.

== 1 May ==
List of shipwrecks: 1 May 1887
Ship	State	Description
John Knox	United Kingdom	The steamship sank 400 yards (370 m) from the shore, 3 nautical miles (5.6 km) east of Cape Ray, Newfoundland Colony with the loss of all 29 crew. She was on a voyage from Glasgow, Renfrewshire to Quebec City. Canada.
Kelpie	United Kingdom	The yacht ran aground on a groyne at Sheerness, Kent and was damaged.
Nordhavet	Norway	The barque ran aground on the Ower Sand, in the North Sea. She was on a voyage from Sunderland, County Durham, United Kingdom to Montevideo, Uruguay. She was refloated and beached at Southwold, Suffolk, United Kingdom.

== 2 May ==
List of shipwrecks: 2 May 1887
Ship	State	Description
Marie Antoinette	France	The brig sprang a leak off Cape Finisterre, Spain and was abandoned. Her crew were rescued by the steamship Blagdon (United Kingdom).

== 5 May ==
List of shipwrecks: 5 May 1887
Ship	State	Description
Ajaccio, and Asie	France	The steamships collided off Barcelona, Spain. Asie sank with the loss of five lives. Survivors were rescued by Ajaccio. Asiewas on a voyage from Marseille, Bouches-du-Rhône to Barcelona. Ajaccio was on a voyage from Cette, Hérault to Algiers, Algeria. Severely damaged at the bow, she put in to Port-Vendres, Pyrénées-Orientales.
Louis O'Neill	United States	The schooner collided with Thos. W. Parker after both lost their tow, and with Swain (both United States), in a gale off Port Stanley, Falkland Island and sank. Her crew reached shore in her boat, they were exposed to the violent storm for 60 hours.
Mary Francis	United Kingdom	The fishing boat struck a sunken rock in the Blasket Islands, County Kerry and sank. Her crew survived.
Welcome	(United Kingdom of Great Britain and Ireland) Guernsey	The ship ran aground in the River Mersey at Liverpool, Lancashire. She was on a voyage from Runcorn, Cheshire to Limerick. She was refloated but struck the quayside and was severely damaged.

== 7 May ==
List of shipwrecks: 7 May 1887
Ship	State	Description
Alpha	United Kingdom	The schooner collided with the schooner Argo (Denmark) in the River Thames at Charlton, Kent and was severely damaged. Alpha was on a voyage from London to the River Tyne.
C. B. Manning	United States	The schooner was wrecked at Yarmouth, Nova Scotia, Canada.
La Champagne, and Ville de Rio de Janeiro	France	The steamship La Champagne was run into by the steamship Ville de Rio de Janeiro in the English Channel 15 nautical miles (28 km) south west of the Eddystone Rock, Cornwall, United Kingdom and was holed below the waterline. Some of her passengers abandoned ship, fighting with the crew. Fifteen survivors were rescued by the steamship Ville de Bordeaux (France). The steam collier Vulture (United Kingdom) took off 1,200 passengers. La Champagne was on a voyage from Havre de Grâce, Seine-Inférieure to New York, United States. She was beached on the Calvados Bank, off Arromanches, Calvados. Ville de Rio de Janeiro was on a voyage from La Plata, Argentina to Havre de Grâce. She consequently foundered. All on board were rescued by Ville de Bordeaux.
Tellus	Norway	The barque was run into by the steamship La Bretagne (France) and sank 30 nautical miles (56 km) off The Lizard, Cornwall. Her seventeen crew were rescued by La Bretagne.

== 8 May ==
List of shipwrecks: 8 May 1887
Ship	State	Description
Shark	United Kingdom	The ship ran aground in the River Mersey at Frodsham, Cheshire. She was on a voyage from Widnes, Cheshire to Workington, Cumberland.

== 9 May ==
List of shipwrecks: 9 May 1887
Ship	State	Description
Galatea	United Kingdom	The schooner was driven ashore at "Kettleloft", Orkney Islands. She was on a voyage from the River Tyne to Sanday, Orkney Islands.
John Jenniford	United Kingdom	The coaster, a steamship, was run down and sunk off the Longships by the steamship R. F. Matthews (United Kingdom) with the loss of one of the four people on board. Survivors were rescued by R. F. Matthews. John Jenniford was on a voyage from Newport, Monmouthshire to Padstow, Cornwall.
Neva	United Kingdom	The ship was sighted in the Atlantic Ocean whilst on a voyage from Banjoewangie, Netherlands East Indies to Lisbon, Portugal. No further trace, reported missing.
Unnamed	Flag unknown	The barque was run down and sunk by a steamship off Sandy Hook, New Jersey, United States. Her crew were rescued by the steamship.

== 10 May ==
List of shipwrecks: 10 May 1887
Ship	State	Description
Dagmar	Russia	The full-rigged ship was abandoned in the Atlantic Ocean (37°30′N 47°52′W). Her crew were rescued by Hermann (Germany). Dagmar was on a voyage from Pensacola, Florida, United States to Lisbon, Portugal.
Northumberland	United Kingdom	The ship was driven ashore at Bay View, New Zealand (formerly Pētane) and was a total loss. The crew were saved. An assisting tug was wrecked with the loss of three crew.
G. E. Wood	United Kingdom	The steamship collided with the steamship Great Eastern (United Kingdom) in the River Mersey and was severely damaged. G. E. Wood was on a voyage from Huelva, Spain to Liverpool, Lancashire.
William Connall	United Kingdom	The steamship ran aground in the Clyde at Glasgow, Renfrewshire.

== 12 May ==
List of shipwrecks: 12 May 1887
Ship	State	Description
Darling Downs	United Kingdom	The full-rigged ship was run into by the steamship Britannia (United Kingdom) and sank 1 3/4 nautical miles (3.2 km) east of the Nore Lightship ( Trinity House). Her crew were rescued by Britannia. Darling Downs was on a voyage from Melbourne, Victoria to London.
Frances	United Kingdom	The Mersey Flat collided with the barque Fontenaye (Flag unknown) in the River Mersey and was severely damaged. Frances was on a voyage from Garston, Lancashire to New Ferry, Cheshire. She was beached.

== 13 May ==
List of shipwrecks: 13 May 1887
Ship	State	Description
Empire State	United States	The passenger ship, a sidewheel paddle steamer, was destroyed by fire and sank at Bristol, Rhode Island.

== 14 May ==
List of shipwrecks: 14 May 1887
Ship	State	Description
Alma	United Kingdom	The ship departed from London for Buenos Aires, Argentina. No further trace, reported overdue.

== 15 May ==
List of shipwrecks: 15 May 1887
Ship	State	Description
Golden Island	United Kingdom	The ship ran aground on the Goodwin Sands, Kent and was wrecked. Her seven crew were rescued by the Deal Lifeboat. She was on a voyage from Antwerp, Belgium to Liverpool, Lancashire.

== 16 May ==
List of shipwrecks: 16 May 1887
Ship	State	Description
Brilliant	United Kingdom	The ketch ran aground on the Haven Hole Spit, in the Thames Estuary. She was on a voyage from London to Goole, Yorkshire.
Fulda	Germany	The steamship ran aground at New York, United States. She was refloated on 18 May.
Zenobia	United Kingdom	The schooner departed from Newport, Monmouthshire. She subsequently foundered with the loss of all hands. Wreckage from the ship washed up at Llanelly, Glamorgan on 2 June.
Unnamed	Flag unknown	The schooner ran aground on the Longsand, in the North Sea off the coast of Essex, United Kingdom.

== 19 May ==
List of shipwrecks: 19 May 1887
Ship	State	Description
Celtic	United Kingdom	The ocean liner collided with the ocean liner Britannic (United Kingdom) 350 nautical miles (650 km) east of Sandy Hook, New Jersey, United States. Both ships were damaged and 12 people were killed on board Britannic. Both ships were escorted to New York, United States.
George	United Kingdom	The barquentine was run into by the steamship Rona (United Kingdom) at Drummore, Wigtownshire and was beached. George was on a voyage from Maryport, Cumberland to Londonderry.
John Hickman	United Kingdom	The full-rigged ship collided with a railway bridge at Velsen, North Holland, Netherlands and was severely damaged.
Onward	United Kingdom	The schooner was driven ashore near Morfa Nefyn, Caernarfonshire. Her crew were rescued.
Owl	United Kingdom	The Mersey Flat was driven ashore and wrecked at Holyhead, Anglesey. Her crew were rescued.
Unnamed	Flag unknown	The ship ran aground on Sarn Badrig.

== 20 May ==
List of shipwrecks: 20 May 1887
Ship	State	Description
Capri	United Kingdom	The ship ran aground in the Dardanelles. She was on a voyage from Civita Vecchia, Italy to Kertch, Russia. She was refloated with the assistance of a number of tugs.
Cochrane	United Kingdom	The steamship foundered in the North Sea. Her thirteen crew survived. She was on a voyage from the River Tyne to Vlissingen, Zeeland, Netherlands.
George Moore	United Kingdom	The steamship was wrecked on The Smalls, Cornwall. Her sixteen crew were rescued by the steamship Juno (United Kingdom). George Moore was on a voyage from Cardiff, Glamorgan to Rochefort, Charente-Inférieure, France.
Go Ahead	New Zealand	The steamship ran aground in fog at Cape Kidnappers during a voyage from Wellington Harbour to Napier with the loss of one life.
Harkaway	United Kingdom	The steamship foundered 30 nautical miles (56 km) south south west of the Smalls Lighthouse, Wales with the loss of thirteen of the sixteen people on board. Survivors were rescued by the cutter yacht Thistle (United Kingdom). Harkaway was on a voyage from Hull, Yorkshire to Liverpool, Lancashire.
Industry	United Kingdom	The schooner was driven ashore and wrecked at New Quay, Cardiganshire. Her crew were rescued by the New Quay Lifeboat.
John Howe	United Kingdom	The ship was driven ashore in the River Mersey near Speke, Lancashire. She was on a voyage from Dublin to Garston, Lancashire.
Livlig	Norway	The brigantine capsized at Northfleet, Kent, United Kingdom.
Najaden	Sweden	The ship was driven ashore and wrecked in the River Mersey at Speke. She was on a voyage from Westervik to Garston.
Tancook	Norway	The barque was driven ashore at Fleetwood, Lancashire. She was refloated in early June and taken in to Fleetwood in a severely damaged condition.
Thomas	United Kingdom	The ship was driven ashore at Whitby, Yorkshire. Her crew were rescued.
Una	United Kingdom	The steam yacht was driven ashore at Southsea, Hampshire. Her crew were rescued by a Coastguard boat. She was refloated and towed in to Southsea.
Italian torpedo boat No. 99	Regia Marina	The torpedo boat was damaged off Dungeness, Kent. She put in to Dover, Kent.
No. 100	Regia Marina	The torpedo boat collided with two vessels off Dungeness and was damaged. She put in to Dover.

== 21 May ==
List of shipwrecks: 21 May 1887
Ship	State	Description
Charley Bowen No. 2	United States	The steamship struck a snag and sank in the Mississippi River near Twin Hollows with the loss of a crew member.

== 22 May ==
List of shipwrecks: 22 May 1887
Ship	State	Description
Menzaleh	France	The steamship suffered an engine breakdown whilst on a voyage from Shanghai, China to Yokohama, Japan. She was towed in to the Saddle Islands by Glenshiel (United Kingdom) and sank there. She was declared a total loss.

== 23 May ==
List of shipwrecks: 23 May 1887
Ship	State	Description
Glenroy	United Kingdom	The full-rigged ship sank in the Red Sea.

== 25 May ==
List of shipwrecks: 25 May 1887
Ship	State	Description
Garnock	United Kingdom	The barque was driven ashore on Staten Island New York City, United States. She was on a voyage from London to Vancouver Island, British Columbia, Canada. She was a total loss.
Great Surgeon	United States	The barque was wrecked in the Spanish East Indies. Her crew survived.

== 26 May ==
List of shipwrecks: 26 May 1887
Ship	State	Description
Ivy	United States	The tug collided with the steamship Wydale (United Kingdom) and sank in the Mississippi River at New Orleans, Louisiana with the loss of one life.

== 27 May ==
List of shipwrecks: 27 May 1887
Ship	State	Description
Addie John	Canada	The schooner was wrecked at Grape Vine Cove.
Svea	Sweden	The ship collided with the pier at South Shields, County Durham, United Kingdom and was severely damaged.

== 28 May ==
List of shipwrecks: 28 May 1887
Ship	State	Description
Cynthia	United Kingdom	The steamship ran aground in the Clyde at Garvel Point, Ayrshire.

== 30 May ==
List of shipwrecks: 30 May 1887
Ship	State	Description
Oder	Germany	The steamship struck a sunken rock and foundered off Socotra, Aden Governorate.
Oswego	United States	The tug was rammed and sunk by the sailing barge May Richards (United States) after a steering error by Oswego 5 nautical miles (9.3 km) below the Colchester Lighthouse, sinking in mid channel three miles (4.8 km) offshore in five fathoms (30 ft; 9.1 m) of water. The wreck was located on 16 June, and was raised and taken to Detroit, Michigan for repairs.

== 31 May ==
List of shipwrecks: 31 May 1887
Ship	State	Description
Jessie	United Kingdom	The smack sprang a leak and was beached at Lamlash, Isle of Arran.
Lucinda Van Valkenburg	United States	Lucinda Van Valkenburg Loaded with a cargo of coal, the wooden schooner sank in 60 feet (18 m) of water in Lake Huron off the coast of Michigan north of Thunder Bay Island at 45.056333°N 83.169667°W after the steamer Lehigh (United States) accidentally rammed her.

== Unknown date ==
List of shipwrecks: Unknown date in May 1887
Ship	State	Description
Adelaide	United Kingdom	The steamship was driven ashore in the Copeland Islands, County Down. She was refloated and taken in to Bangor, County Down.
A. N. Hansen	Denmark	The steamship was driven ashore at Domesnes, Russia.
Anna Ottilie	United Kingdom	The schooner ran aground at "Dracko". She was on a voyage from Grimsby, Lincolnshire, United Kingdom to Riga.
Benledi	United Kingdom	The steamship ran aground at Yenikioi, Ottoman Empire whilst avoiding a collision with another vessel. She was on a voyage from Nicholaieff, Russia to Genoa, Italy.
Bertie	United Kingdom	The steamship ran aground in the Suez Canal near Kabret, Eypt. She was later refloated.
Borghese	United Kingdom	The steamship ran aground in the Paraná River.
C. B. Manning	United States	The fishing schooner went aground on Gannet Ledge off the coast of Nova Scotia, Canada, during a halibut-fishing expedition and became a total loss. Her entire crew survived.
Ceará	Brazil	The steamship was lost.
Christiane	Norway	The barque foundered at sea. Her crew were rescued. She was on a voyage from Troon, Ayrshire, United Kingdom to Tromsø.
Dan	Norway	The brig ran aground at Saint-Nazaire, Loire-Inférieure, France.
Dilston Castle	United Kingdom	The steamship ran aground at "Ingibournon", Ottoman Empire. She was on a voyage from Sulina, Romania to Gibraltar.
Drott	Sweden	The schooner was driven ashore at "Amack", Denmark. She was on a voyage from Kalmar to Rochester, Kent, United Kingdom.
Eliza and Emma	United Kingdom	The brigantine ran aground on the Shipwash Sand, in the North Sea off the coast of Suffolk. She was refloated with assistance from Increase (United Kingdom).
Emma	Germany	The steamship sank. She was on a voyage from Hartlepool, County Durham, United Kingdom to "Catingsiel".
Freeda A. Willey	United States	The ship collided with the steamship Martello (United Kingdom) and sank in the Gedney Channel. Freeda A. Willey was on a voyage from Pensacola, Florida to New York.
Gustaf Adolf	Flag unknown	The ship was driven ashore and severely damaged at Cardiff, Glamorgan, United Kingdom.
Helma	Sweden	The brig was wrecked in Robin Hoods Bay. Her crew were rescued. She was on a voyage from Halmstad to Hull, Yorkshire, United Kingdom.
Hercules	United Kingdom	The steamship was driven ashore and wrecked at Fernandina Beach, Florida.
Hiram	Sweden	The schooner ran aground at "Fehermern". She was on a voyage from Oskarshamn to Fredericia, Denmark. She was refloated and towed in to Korsør, Denmark by a steamship.
Ida	Sweden	The barque ran aground at Saltholm, Denmark. She was on a voyage from Sundswall to Hartlepool.
Illinois	United States	The ship ran aground in Lower New York Bay. She was on a voyage from Antwerp, Belgium to New York. She was refloated and completed her voyage.
Ivy	United States	The tug collided with the steamship Wydale (United Kingdom) and sank at New Orleans, Louisiana.
Jean Baptiste	United Kingdom	The brig was driven ashore at Pederneira, Portugal. Her crew were rescued. She was on a voyage from Cette, Hérault to Saint Petersburg, Russia.
Lauretta	United Kingdom	The barque ran aground off the coast of Florida. She was on a voyage from Key West, Florida to Brest, Finistère, France.
Lockton	United Kingdom	The steamship was driven ashore and damaged at Lågskär, Grand Duchy of Finland. She was refloated and taken in to Stockholm, Sweden.
Margarita, and Sirius	Germany; Russia	The barque Margarita and the schooner Sirius collided off Falsterbo, Sweden and were both severely damaged. Sirius was on a voyage from Antwerp to Riga. She was subsequently run into by the barque Jonstorp (Sweden) and put in to Copenhagen, Denmark.
Marianne	Germany	The galiot was driven ashore at Hela.
Mars	Flag unknown	The steamship caught fire at Amsterdam, North Holland, Netherlands.
Mere Frutsanst	Belgium	The fishing vessel was abandoned in the Dogger Bank. Her crew were rescued by the fishing vessel Watergeus (Belgium).
Mountain Maid	United Kingdom	The schooner was driven ashore at Raven Point, County Wexford.
Navigatore	Italy	The barque was driven ashore at Kronstadt, Russia. She was on a voyage from Charleston, South Carolina to Kronstadt.
Ocean King	United Kingdom	The steamship was driven ashore at "Cape Larache", Canada. She was refloated and resumed her voyage, but was consequently beached at Three Rivers, Quebec, Canada. She was later refloated and taken in to Montreal, Quebec, arriving on 27 May.
Papa Giacinto	Italy	The barque was abandoned at sea. Her crew were rescued by the barque Circe (France). Papa Giacinto was on a voyage from Marseille, Bouches-du-Rhône, France to Montevideo, Uruguay.
Svea	Sweden	The schooner collided with the steamship Flaxman (United Kingdom) and sank at Buenos Aires, Argentina. Svea was on a voyage from New York to Campana, Argentina.
Tancarville	Flag unknown	The ship ran aground at Rotterdam, South Holland, Netherlands.
Teddington	United Kingdom	The steamship was driven ashore at Jeddah, Hejaz Vilayet. She was later refloated and resumed her voyage.
Thyra	Norway	The schooner was driven ashore at "Nordschouwen", Zeeland, Netherlands. She was on a voyagte from Fredrikstad to Dordrecht, South Holland.
Toni C.	Austria-Hungary	The barque was wrecked at Suedia, Ottoman Empire.
Uranus	Flag unknown	The ship was driven ashore at Cape Henelopen, Delaware, United States. She subsequently became a wreck.
Wrights	Flag unknown	The ship collided with Union (Flag unknown) and was severely damaged.
Zulette	Flag unknown	The ship was lost in Canadian waters.
Unnamed	Spain	The fishing boat was run down and sunk off Rota by the steamship Smeaton (United Kingdom) with the loss of three lives.
