= PS Edith =

Paddle steamer cargo vessel

History
- Name: 1870–1912: PS/TSS Edith; 1912–1914: TSS Vos
- Owner: 1870–1912: London and North Western Railway; 1912–1914: Captain A. Depauw, Antwerp
- Operator: 1870–1912: London and North Western Railway; 1912–1913: Captain A. Depauw, Antwerp
- Port of registry: (United Kingdom)
- Route: 1870–1912: Holyhead - Greenore
- Builder: A. Leslie and Company
- Launched: 1870
- Out of service: 1914
- Fate: Scrapped

General characteristics
- Tonnage: 758 gross register tons (GRT)
- Length: 250.5 ft (76.4 m)
- Beam: 30.1 ft (9.2 m)
- Draught: 14.4 ft (4.4 m)

PS/TSS Edith was a paddle steamer cargo vessel operated by the London and North Western Railway from 1870 to 1912.

== History ==
She was built by A. Leslie and Company for the London and North Western Railway in 1870. She may have been named after Edith May Moon, a daughter of the company's then chairman, Richard Moon, and was the first paddle steamer used on the Greenore service that Moon had championed.

On 8 September 1875 she collided with the Duchess of Sutherland in Holyhead and sank. Arrangements were made to raise her in May 1876, but on 31 October 1876 the City of Dublin Steam Packet Company's steamship St Patrick collided with the wreck destroying the lifting apparatus, leading to a court case in which it was ruled in May 1877 that the St. Patrick was at fault. She was eventually raised on 4 December 1877, and was subsequently repaired and returned to service.

She was converted from a paddle steamer to a twin screw steamer in 1892 by Cammell Laird of Birkenhead.

She was withdrawn in March 1912 and sold to the West of Scotland Shipbreaking Company for scrap, but was resold to Belgian owner, Captain A Depauw, and re-registered as the TSS Vos in Antwerp. Seized by Belgian Government in 1913 who claimed that her owner had made preparations to use her for the contraband of arms to South America. She was laid up in Zeebrugge until January 1914 when she was sold to shipbreakers.
