= SS Petriana =

Oil tanker built in 1879

Coordinates: 38.31°S 144.65°E

History
- Name: SS Petriana
- Namesake: Petriana
- Owner: Asiatic Petroleum Company (Note: Full list of owners: Shell Transport & Trading Co. Ltd (1898–1903); Petroleum Transport & Storage Co. Ltd (1891–1898); Alfred Suart (1886–1891); William Gibson (1885–1886); Edward J. Walker (1884–1885); R. Dickinson (1882–1884); Bell & Symonds (1879–1882))
- Port of registry: London, England
- Route: Borneo to Australia
- Builder: A. Leslie and Company
- Launched: 30 October 1879
- Completed: 1879
- Fate: Wrecked 28 November 1903

General characteristics
- Type: Cargo ship (1879–1891); Oil tanker (1891–1903)
- Tonnage: 1,821 imperial tons
- Length: 260.5 feet (79.4 m)
- Depth: 21.75 feet (6.63 m)
- Decks: Single-deck
- Propulsion: Screw, auxiliary sails
- Speed: 9.5 knots

SS Petriana was an iron screw steamer built in 1879 that was converted into an oil tanker. On 28 November 1903, while transporting 1,300 tonnes of petroleum from Borneo to Australia, it struck a reef near Point Nepean, Victoria, outside of Port Phillip Bay. The vessel was subsequently abandoned, but not before its cargo was released as part of efforts to save the ship, causing Australia's first major oil spill. Under the White Australia policy, the Chinese and Malay sailors crewing the Petriana were refused entry to Australia and forced to stay on a crowded tugboat for several days. Their treatment led to a political controversy in the lead-up to the 1903 federal election.

== Early career ==
Petriana was built in 1879 by A. Leslie and Company at its yard in Newcastle upon Tyne, England. It had a length of 260.5 feet (79.4 m) and a gross tonnage of 1,821 imperial tons. It was built as a cargo ship for the London firm of Bell & Symonds, passing through a series of owners before being acquired by petroleum industry pioneer Alfred Suart in 1886. It was converted to a tanker in 1891, and in 1898 was purchased by the Shell Transport & Trading Company, which in 1903 transferred it to the Asiatic Petroleum Company, its new joint venture with Royal Dutch.

== Wreck ==
Petriana left Balikpapan in the Dutch East Indies with 1,300 tonnes of petroleum for the Australian market, travelling to Melbourne via Sydney. She was also carrying quantities of naphtha and benzene. The ship had a crew of 27 – 16 Chinese and 11 Malay – while the nine others on board were British. (Note: The captain, his wife, six officers and a cabin boy.)

On the morning of 28 November 1903, Petriana was boarded by Henry Press, a pilot of 20 years' experience, who was to guide the ship through The Heads into Port Phillip Bay. There was a heavy fog which Press hoped would lift, but it failed to do so. At 7 a.m. the ship struck a reef just east of Point Nepean, now known as the Petriana Reef (or misspelt as Patriana Reef). The ship's engine room and stokehold were flooded within moments, leaving the ship without power.

=== Recovery attempts ===
For the rest of the day Melbourne Harbor Trust tug James Paterson tried unsuccessfully to push Petriana off the reef. Two other ships were called to assist on the next day, the tug Eagle and the salvage schooner Enterprise. However, the pumps on the Enterprise broke down and Petriana remained inundated with water. After a final attempt by the James Paterson on 30 November, the ship was formally abandoned. It eventually sank and now lies in pieces approximately 200 metres (660 ft) off Point Nepean. The wreck is listed on the Victorian Heritage Register.

=== Oil spill ===
In an attempt to lighten the vessel, it was decided to pump the oil cargo into the sea. This resulted in Australia's first major oil spill. The surrounding beaches were contaminated for months, although one observer described the spill as "a film of great beauty, radiating all the colours of the rainbow". The Petriana oil spill had "catastrophic environmental consequences", and remained Australia's largest until that of the Princess Anne Marie offshore of Western Australia in 1975.

== Aftermath ==
=== Investigation ===
A Court of Marine Inquiry assigned the blame for the wreck to Press, and on 9 December he was convicted of misconduct. His pilot's licence was suspended for twelve months and he was ordered to pay the costs of the investigation.

=== Treatment of the crew ===
On the evening of the wreck, the James Paterson took those rescued from the Petriana to Queenscliff. The ship's captain William Kerr and his wife were passed through quarantine and then given accommodation in the town. However, the other officers and crew were required to remain on the tug, initially with the explanation that they would be needed for recovery attempts. Once the ship had been formally abandoned, immigration officials applied the Immigration Restriction Act 1901, refusing permission for the Asian crew members to land and forcing the tug to anchor off Williamstown. The British officers were also refused permission to land at first, however officials relented after five hours and the government later denied there had been a delay. On the evening of 30 November, the 27 Asian crew members were transferred to the Kasuga Maru, a Japanese mail steamer bound for Hong Kong, from which they were to be returned to their original port of Singapore as required by the Merchant Shipping Act 1854.

Captain Kerr released a press statement highly critical of the treatment of his crew, in which he said:

I have sailed in many seas the world over, but have never before seen or heard of a country where the shipwrecked mariner was not allowed to set his foot on dry land. [...] If this treatment of my crew is a fair specimen of your humanity it is about equal to the worst barbarity of other nations, and if it is forced on you by your laws, I regret to say they are a disgrace to the British Empire.

=== Political consequences ===
There was an immediate public reaction to the government's handling of the wreck, which occurred in the middle of the 1903 federal election campaign. The Argus published numerous letters accusing the government of cruelty and damaging Australia's international reputation. The federal government's handling of the case was contrasted with that of the Victorian colonial government, which in 1891 had accommodated the Afro-Canadian crew members of the shipwrecked Joseph H. Scammell. The Age was initially equivocal but supported the government once criticism became sustained. In Sydney, The Sydney Morning Herald and Daily Telegraph adopted the stance of the Argus, whereas The Bulletin referred to the crew members using racial slurs and labelled them "very undesirable immigrants". It accused the other newspapers of slandering the government by portraying them as heartless.

Prime Minister Alfred Deakin sought to use the incident to promote his zero-tolerance approach to the White Australia policy. When the press began to question the government's actions, he claimed that the actual responsibility for the situation lay with the ship's owners. Deakin's departmental secretary Atlee Hunt had in fact informed the shipping agency that the crew could be landed on Coode Island, but that they would be liable for a £100 fine for each crew member who escaped. They were unwilling to take the risk and therefore arranged for the crew to be transshipped rather than landed. Deakin publicly defended the actions of both Hunt and the immigration officials who had originally refused the sailors entry, stating the latter had acted in the spirit of "utmost humanity".

The Petriana incident was "constantly raised" at election meetings in Victoria and Tasmania. The Attorney-General, James Drake, told a meeting in Sydney:

It was undesirable that educated gentlemen who had been in gaol, or coloured men who had been shipwrecked, should land in Australia in defiance of the law. They [the government] intended to keep their race pure, and make Australia a place worth living in.

The issue had no measurable impact on the election results, which saw the parliamentary status quo maintained and only a single seat change hands in Victoria. The government was nonetheless concerned by the possibility of negative coverage overseas. In early 1904 it issued a statement internationally via Reuters which stated that "the coloured men had been well cared for" and quoted Deakin as saying "any complaints are baseless and are merely being employed for electioneering purposes". A similar incident occurred in March 1904, when the Japanese crew of the wrecked cargo ship Elba arrived in Sydney, but controversy was averted when the local customs officials allowed the men onshore.

== See also ==
- List of oil spills
- Tampa affair, similar issue before the 2001 election

== Sources ==
- Foster, Leonie (2014). "Shipwrecks and the White Australia policy". The Great Circle. 36 (2). The Australian Association for Maritime History: 68–84. JSTOR 24583070.
