= Asiatic Petroleum Company =

Joint venture between Shell and Royal Dutch (1903–1951)

Asiatic Petroleum Company (APC) was a joint venture between the Shell and Royal Dutch oil companies founded in 1903. It operated in Asia in the early 20th century. The corporate headquarters were on The Bund in Shanghai, China. The division tested the limits of corporate liability in the Lennard's Carrying Co Ltd v Asiatic Petroleum Co Ltd case.

The company was involved in the early developments of Frank Whittle in the jet engine field, with Isaac Lubbock of the company devising a suitable combustion chamber design, known as the 'Lubbock Burner' and used in the Power Jets WU and subsequent engines.

In 1951, China requisitioned all property belonging to the company in retaliation for the Hong Kong Government's requisitioning of the tanker Yung Hao.

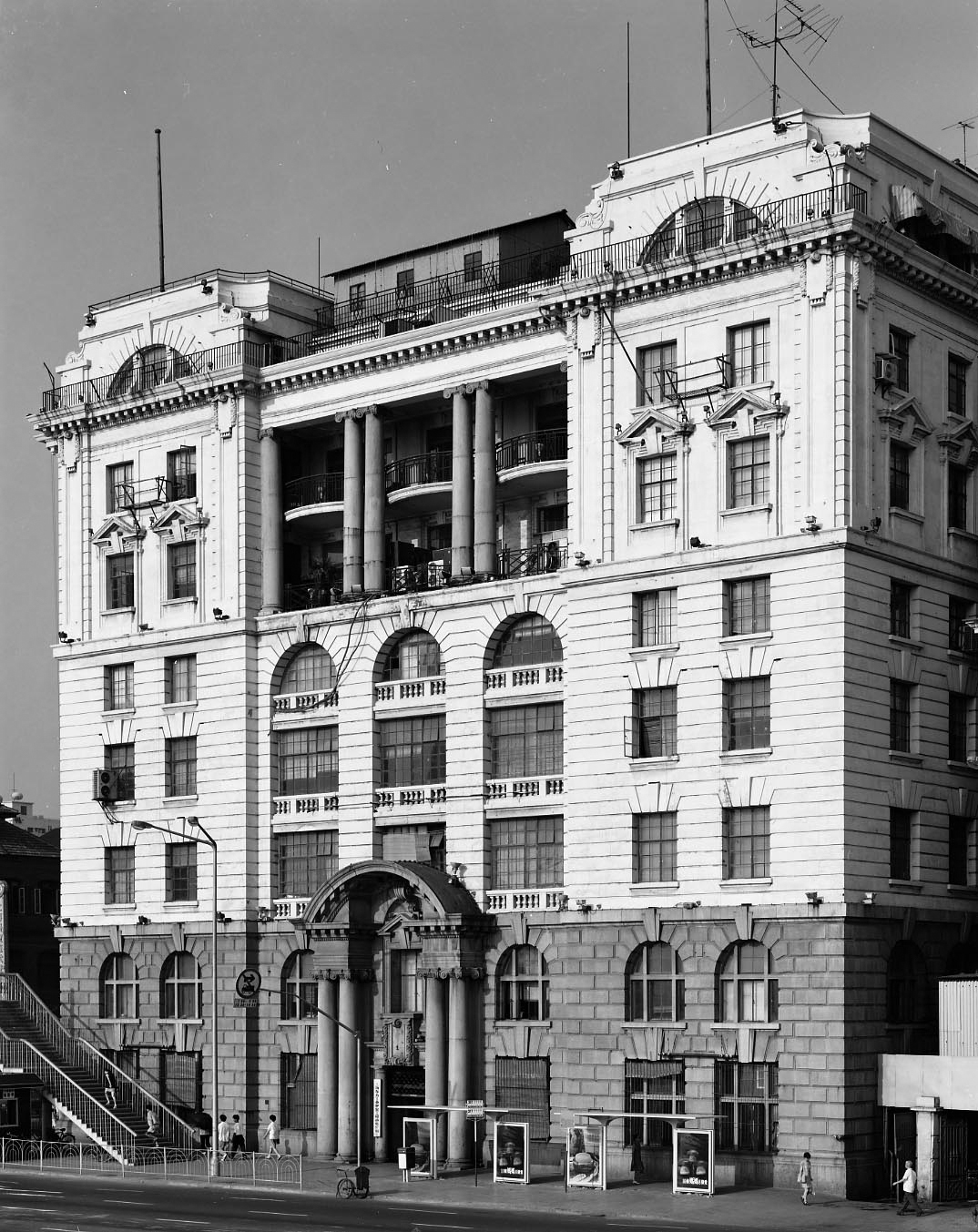
Asian Oil Building

== See also ==
- SS Petriana, APC vessel that caused one of the first major maritime oil spills
- Photograph courtesy of Paul Pak-hing Lee Studio
