= PS Duchess of Sutherland =

History
- Name: 1868–1908: PS/TSS Duchess of Sutherland
- Owner: 1868–1908: London and North Western Railway
- Operator: 1868–1908: London and North Western Railway
- Port of registry: (United Kingdom)
- Route: 1868–1908: Holyhead - Greenore
- Builder: A. Leslie and Company
- Launched: 1868
- Out of service: 1908
- Fate: Scrapped

General characteristics
- Tonnage: 893 gross register tons (GRT)
- Length: 251 ft (77 m)
- Beam: 30.1 ft (9.2 m)
- Draught: 14.4 ft (4.4 m)

PS/TSS Duchess of Sutherland was a paddle steamer cargo vessel operated by the London and North Western Railway from 1868 to 1908.

== History ==
She was built by A. Leslie and Company for the London and North Western Railway in 1868.

On 8 September 1875, she collided with the paddle steamer Edith in Holyhead which resulted in the sinking of Edith.

She was converted from a paddle steamer to a twin screw steamer in 1888 by Cammell Laird of Birkenhead.
