= Zenobia (1868 ship) =

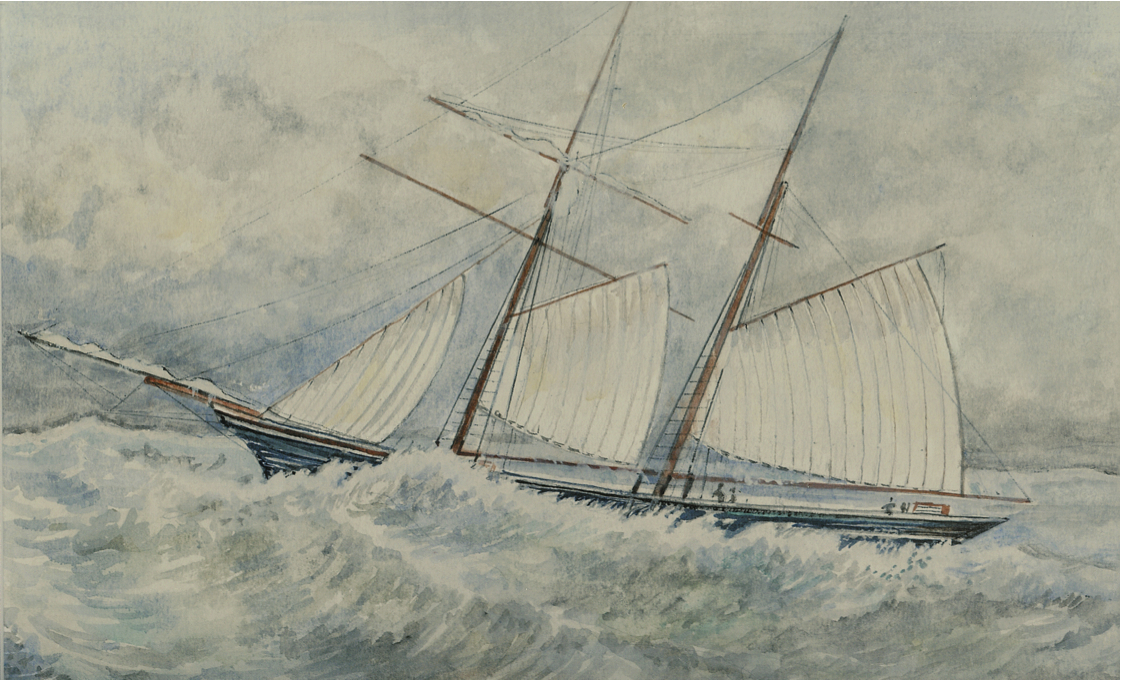
- The Zenobia, as depicted by Samuel Fitzwalter, descendant of her final captain also by the same name.

History
- Name: Zenobia
- Launched: 21 July 1868
- Fate: Lost at sea around 2 June 1887

General characteristics
- Class & type: merchant schooner
- Tons burthen: 89

The Zenobia was a merchant schooner ship launched on 21 July 1868, then under captain C. Southwood.

On 16 May 1887 the 89-ton vessel sailed from Newport, Monmouthshire carrying coal, and was lost at sea. Parts of the boat were found ashore in Llanelli on 2 June 1887.
