= A. Leslie and Company =

Andrew Leslie & Co, Hebburn
- Company type: Private
- Industry: Shipbuilding
- Founded: 1853
- Defunct: 1886
- Fate: Mergers with R and W Hawthorn
- Successor: Hawthorn Leslie and Company
- Headquarters: Newcastle upon Tyne, North-East England
- Key people: Andrew Leslie
- Products: Ships
- Number of employees: 2600

Andrew Leslie & Co, Hebburn was a shipbuilding company that was started in 1853 on an 8-acre site at Hebburn Quay, Newcastle upon Tyne. The company later merged with the locomotive manufacturer R and W Hawthorn to create Hawthorn Leslie and Company in 1886, when the founder Andrew Leslie retired.

Between 1854 and 1885 the ship yard built 255 vessels. and in 1866 constructed a dry dock, which exists till present day. The company employed around 2600 men, with more jobs in ancillary trades. By 1886, the company later merged with the locomotives company R. and W. Hawthorn, forming the Hawthorn Leslie & Company.

== Ships built ==
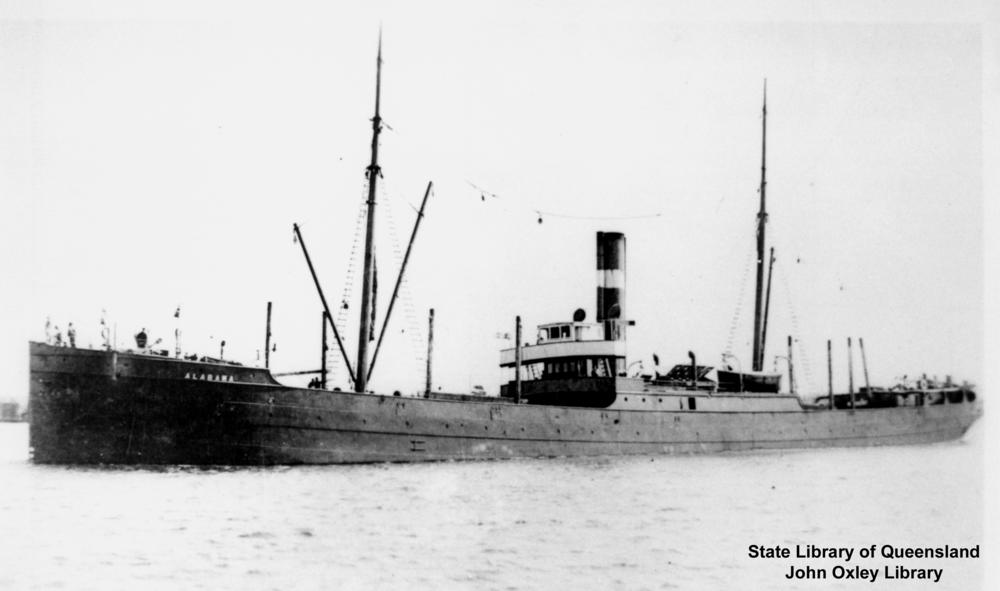
1,940 GRT cargo steamship Alabama, built in 1879 by Andrew Leslie & Co at Hebburn-on-Tyne as Tantallon. She sailed under successive owners, names and flags as Raymondos and Raymond before being bought by Watts, Watts & Co in 1899 and renamed Alabama. James Paterson & Co of Melbourne, Victoria bought her in 1907. She ran aground in 1916 but suffered little damage. North China Steamship Co of Tientsin bought her in 1925 and renamed her Pei Tai. She was scrapped in 1935.

In total company built 258 ships. Some of the better-known ships built by Andrew Leslie & Co include:

- SS Petriana, chemical and oil product tanker, completed in 1879 for Bell & Symonds, London.
- SS Tantallon, cargo steamship, completed in 1879 for JD Milburn, Newcastle.
- SS Robert Dickinson, chemical and oil product tanker, completed in 1881 for Bell & Symonds, London.
