= Russian ship Admiral Lazarev =

Four ships of the Imperial Russian Navy, Soviet Navy and Russian Navy have been named after Admiral Mikhail Petrovich Lazarev.

- Russian monitor Admiral Lazarev – the lead ship of her class of monitor
- Russian cruiser Admiral Lazarev – an Admiral Nakhimov-class light cruiser subsequently named Krasnyi Kavkaz
- Soviet cruiser Admiral Lazarev – a Sverdlov-class cruiser
- Russian battlecruiser Admiral Lazarev – a Kirov-class missile cruiser originally named Frunze
