= Russian monitor Admiral Greig =

Imperial Russian Navy's Admiral Lazarev-class monitors

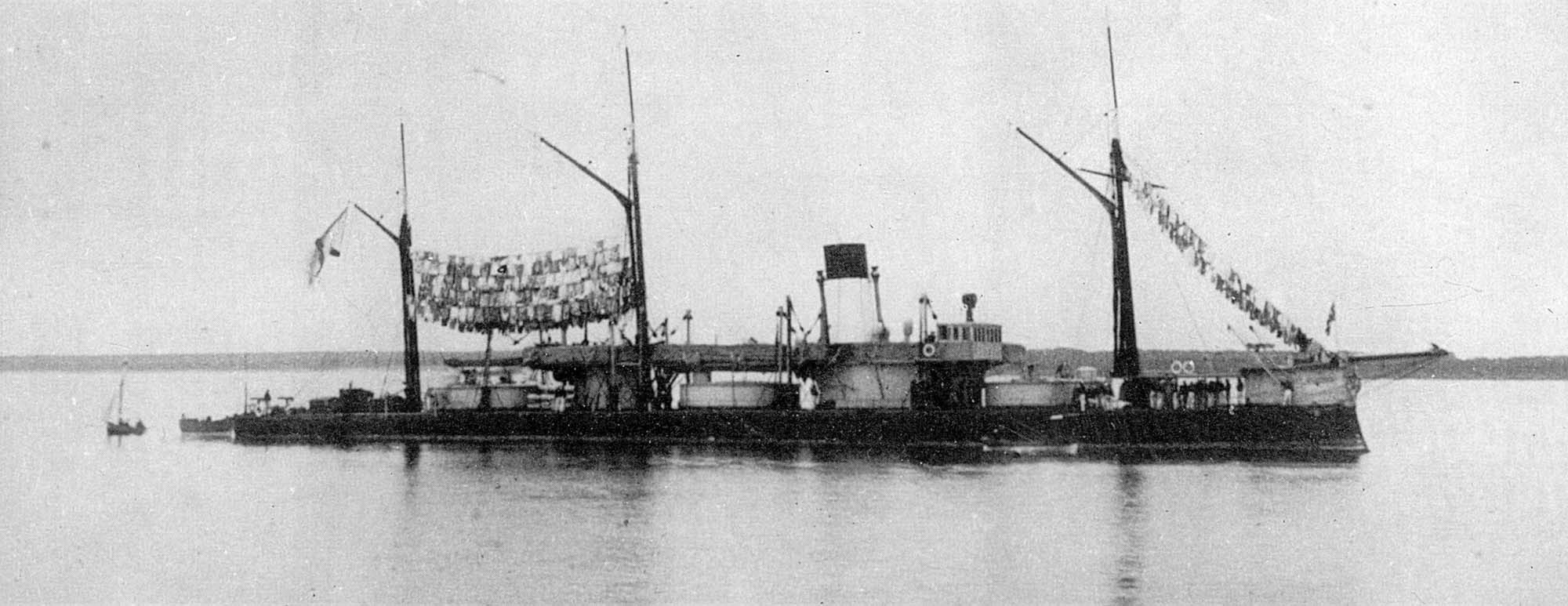
- Admiral Greig at anchor; the crew's laundry is drying on her rigging

History

Russian Empire
- Name: Admiral Greig
- Namesake: Samuel Greig
- Ordered: 1865
- Builder: New Admiralty Shipyard
- Cost: 1,596,700 rubles
- Laid down: 10 May 1866 (Note: All dates used in this article are New Style.)
- Launched: 30 October 1867
- In service: 1872
- Out of service: 31 March 1907
- Reclassified: As coastal-defense ship, 13 February 1892
- Stricken: 22 December 1909
- Fate: Scrapped, 1912

General characteristics (as built)
- Type: Monitor
- Displacement: 3,820–3,881 long tons (3,881–3,943 t)
- Length: 262 ft (79.9 m) (o/a)
- Beam: 43 ft (13.1 m)
- Draft: 21 ft (6.4 m)
- Installed power: 2,020 ihp (1,510 kW); 4 rectangular fire-tube boilers
- Propulsion: 1 Shaft; 1 Horizontal direct-action steam engine
- Speed: 10 knots (19 km/h; 12 mph)
- Range: 1,200–1,500 nmi (2,200–2,800 km; 1,400–1,700 mi) at 9 knots (17 km/h; 10 mph)
- Complement: 269–74 officers and crewmen
- Armament: 3 × twin 9-inch (229 mm) Rifled muzzle-loading guns
- Armor: Belt: 3–4.5 in (76–114 mm); Gun turrets: 6–6.5 in (152–165 mm); Conning tower: 5 in (127 mm); Deck: 1 in (25 mm)

The Russian monitor Admiral Greig was the second and last of the two Admiral Lazarev-class monitors built for the Imperial Russian Navy in the late 1860s. She was assigned to the Baltic Fleet upon completion and remained there for her entire uneventful career. She was reclassified as a coast-defense ironclad in 1892 before she became a training ship later that decade. Admiral Greig was decommissioned in 1907, stricken from the Navy List in 1909 and scrapped in 1912.

== Design and description ==
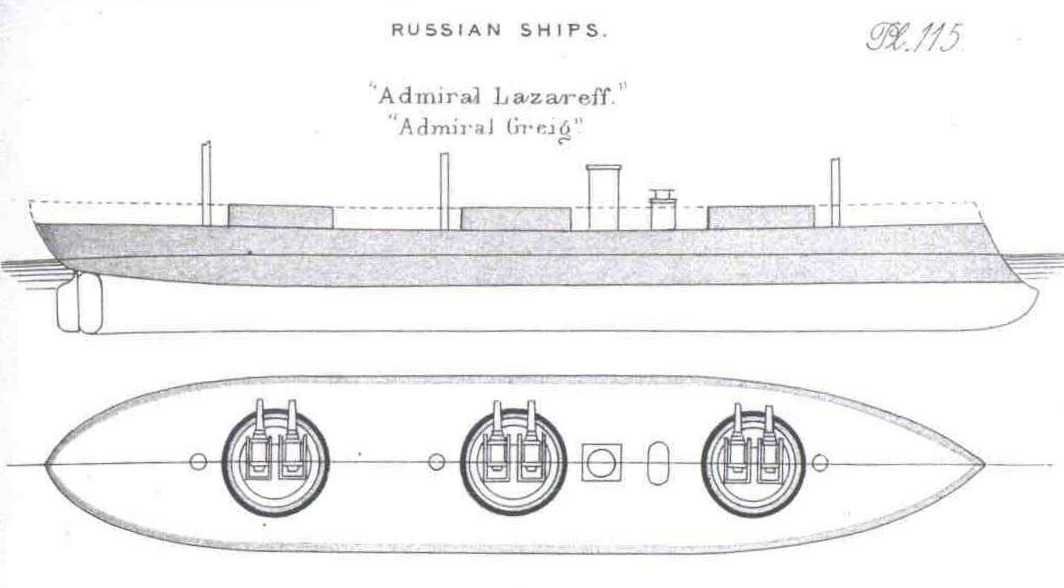
Right elevation and plan from Brassey's Naval Annual 1888

The Admiral Lazarev-class monitors were significantly larger than their predecessors, the Charodeika class, and had an overall length of 262 feet (79.9 m), a beam of 43 feet (13.1 m) and a maximum draft of 21 feet (6.4 m). The ships were designed to displace 3,505 long tons (3,561 t), but turned out to be overweight and actually displaced 3,820 to 3,881 long tons (3,881 to 3,943 t). They were fitted with a plough-shaped ram. Their crew consisted of 269–74 officers and crewmen. The Admiral Lazarev-class ships had a single two-cylinder horizontal direct-acting steam engine that drove a single propeller, using steam provided by four rectangular fire-tube boilers. The engine was designed to produce a total of 2,020 indicated horsepower (1,510 kW) which gave a heavily loaded Admiral Greig a speed of 9.54 knots (17.67 km/h; 10.98 mph) from 2,031 ihp (1,515 kW) when she ran her sea trials in October 1871. The ships had a range of about 1,200–1,500 nautical miles (2,200–2,800 km; 1,400–1,700 mi) at a speed of 9 knots (17 km/h; 10 mph) and were fitted with a light fore-and-aft sailing rig to steady them and aid in maneuvering.

=== Armament ===
The monitors were originally designed to be armed with six 20-caliber Obukhov 11-inch (279 mm) rifled muzzle-loading guns, a pair in each Coles-type turret. Around 1874–1875 the guns were replaced by three 17-caliber, 11-inch rifled guns, based on a Krupp design. During the Russo-Turkish War of 1877–1878, a 9-inch mortar was fitted to attack the thin deck armor of enemy ships, but accuracy was poor and they were later removed, probably in the early 1880s. A more powerful, 22-caliber, 11-inch gun was installed aboard Admiral Greig and her sister ship Admiral Lazarev during the 1880s.

Light guns for use against torpedo boats were added to the Admiral Lazarev class during the Russo-Turkish War when a pair of 4-pounder 3.4-inch (86 mm) guns were mounted on the roofs of the fore and aft gun turrets and a 44-millimeter (1.7 in) Engstrem 4-barreled quick-firing (QF) gun. By the early 1890s, Admiral Greig's light armament consisted of one 2.5-inch (64 mm) Baranov QF gun, five 47-millimeter (1.9 in) QF Hotchkiss guns, replacing the 4-pounders, and a pair of 37-millimeter (1.5 in) QF Hotchkiss five-barreled revolving cannon. The monitors could also carry 12–15 mines intended to be used to create a secure anchorage.

=== Armor ===
The hull of the Admiral Lazarev-class monitors was completely covered by wrought iron armor that 4–4.5 inches (102–114 mm) thick amidships and thinned to 3 inches (76 mm) aft and 3.5 inches (89 mm) forward of the main belt. The turrets had 6 inches (152 mm) inches of armor, except around the gun ports, where it thickened to 6.5 inches (165 mm). The conning tower was 5 inches (127 mm) thick and the deck armor was in two layers with a total thickness of 1 inch.

== Construction and service ==
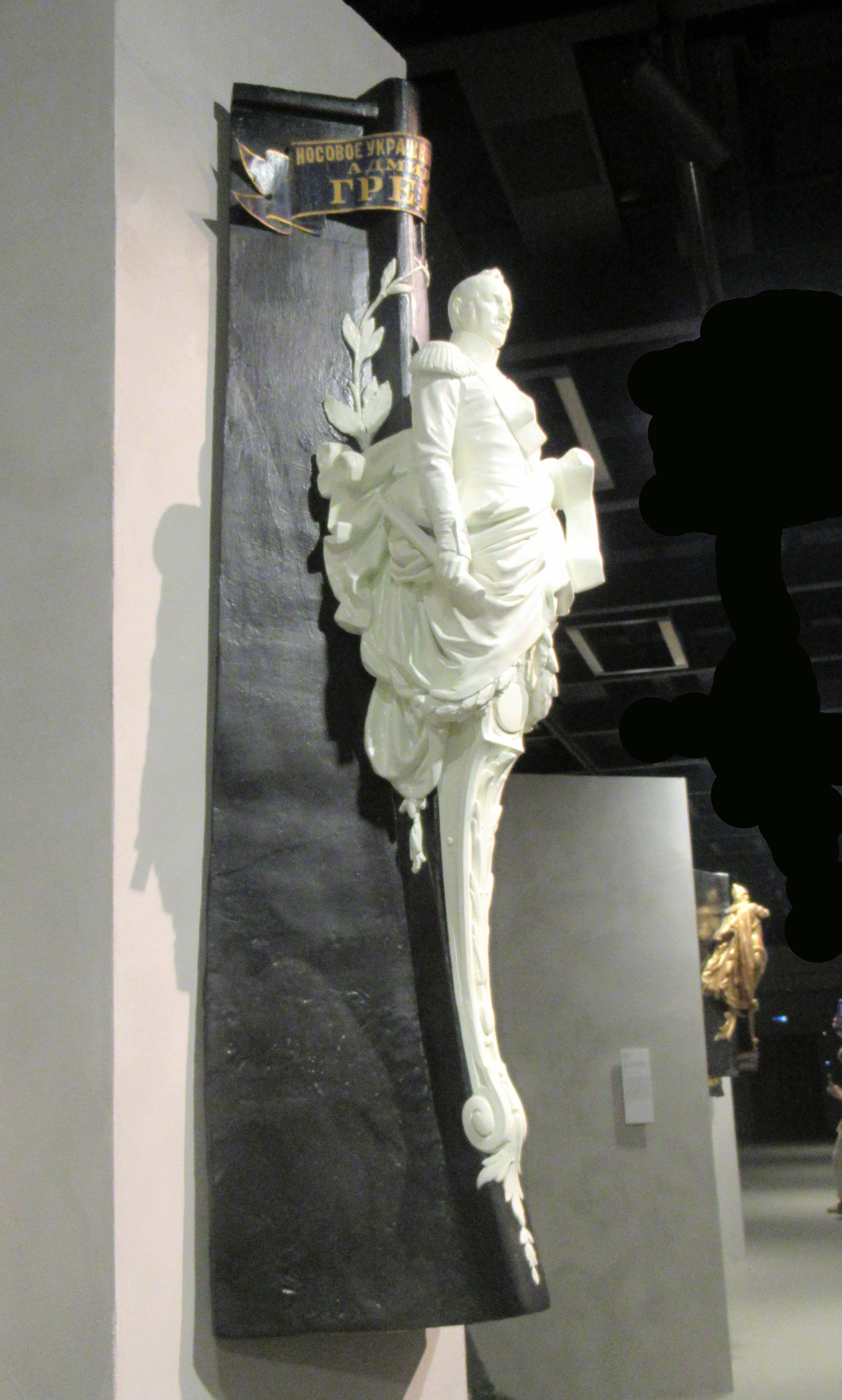
Figurehead

Admiral Greig, named for Admiral Samuel Greig, was ordered in 1865 from the New Admiralty Shipyard, Saint Petersburg. Construction began on 1 September although the formal keel-laying was not until 10 May 1866. Construction was delayed by changes to the design and late deliveries of components. She was launched on 30 October and then transferred to Kronstadt for fitting out as the shallow waters around Saint Petersburg prevented deep-draft ships from being completed. This added more delays as the dockyard there lacked the equipment to efficiently fit out the ships, and she officially entered service in 1872 at the cost of 1,596,700 rubles.

The ship was assigned to the Baltic Fleet upon completion, but Admiral Greig was not fully equipped until around 1872. The ship had her boilers replaced in 1881–1882 and again around 1900–1903, possibly with cylindrical boilers. She was reclassified as a coast-defense ironclad on 13 February 1892 and frequently served with the Artillery Training Detachment of the Baltic Fleet. Admiral Greig was transferred to the Port of Kronstadt on 31 March 1907 and was stricken on 22 December 1909. The ship was scrapped in Saint Petersburg in 1912. One source suggests that she and her sister Admiral Lazarev, and the two Admiral Spiridov-class monitors, were used as floating piers for the railroad bridge over the Svir River during the construction of the Saint Petersburg–Murmansk Railroad in 1916 before being scrapped in the 1920s.
