= Admiral Spiridov-class monitor =

Imperial Russian Navy warship

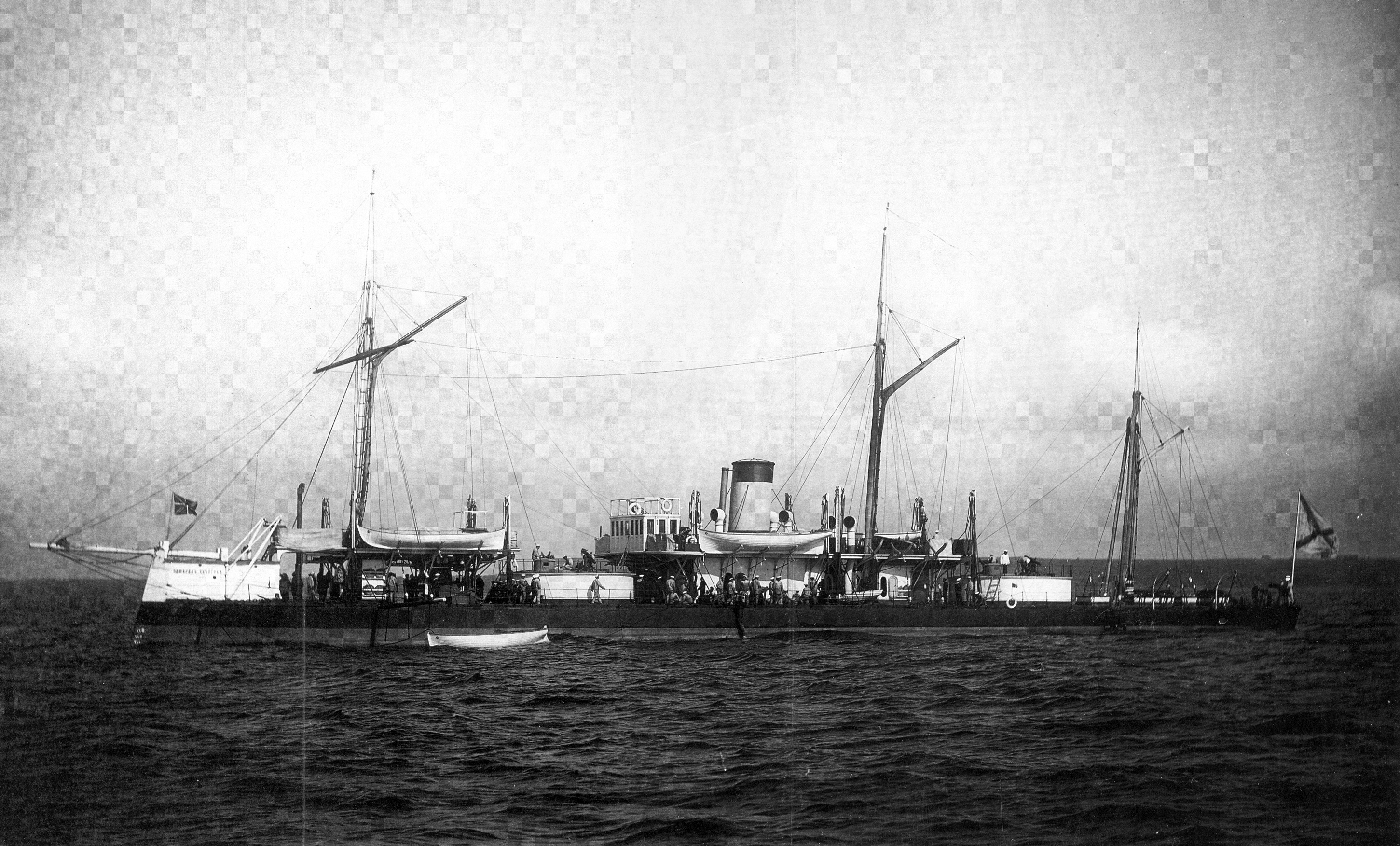
- Admiral Chichagov at anchor

Class overview
- Name: Admiral Spiridov
- Builders: Semiannikov & Poletika Shipyard, Saint Petersburg
- Operators: Imperial Russian Navy
- Preceded by: Admiral Lazarev class
- Succeeded by: Russian ironclad Petr Veliky
- Cost: 1,177,500 Rubles
- Built: 1866–1869
- In commission: 1869–1907
- Completed: 2
- Scrapped: 2

General characteristics (as built)
- Type: Monitor
- Displacement: 3,505–3,587 long tons (3,561–3,645 t)
- Length: 254 ft (77.4 m) (waterline)
- Beam: 43 ft (13.1 m)
- Draft: 21 ft (6.4 m)
- Installed power: 2,000 ihp (1,500 kW); 4 rectangular fire-tube boilers
- Propulsion: 1 Shaft; 1 Horizontal direct-action steam engine
- Speed: 10 knots (19 km/h; 12 mph)
- Range: 1,400 nmi (2,600 km; 1,600 mi) at 10 knots (19 km/h; 12 mph)
- Complement: 280 officers and crewmen
- Armament: 2 × twin 9-inch (229 mm) Rifled muzzle-loading guns; 12–15 mines
- Armor: Belt: 3–7.5 in (76–191 mm); Gun turrets: 6–6.5 in (152–165 mm); Conning tower: 5 in (127 mm); Deck: 1 in (25 mm)

The Admiral Spiridov class were a pair of monitors built for the Imperial Russian Navy in the late 1860s. The sister ships were assigned to the Baltic Fleet upon completion and remained there for their entire careers. Aside from several accidental collisions and one grounding, their careers were uneventful. They were reclassified as coast-defense ironclads in 1892 before they became training ships in 1900. The Admiral Spiridovs were stricken from the Navy List in 1907; one ship became a stationary target and the other a coal-storage barge. Their ultimate fates are unknown.

== Design and description ==
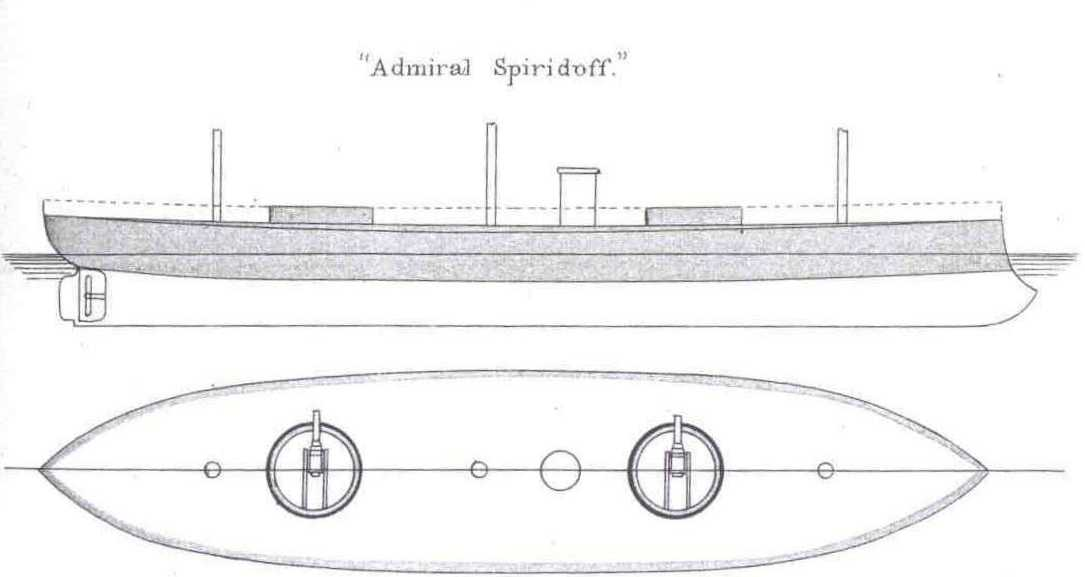
Line drawing from Brassey's Naval Annual, 1888

By late 1863, the Russian Admiralty Board had begun planning for the second generation of ironclads to succeed those ships then under construction. They ordered eight ships, two fully rigged seagoing types and six coastal defense ships, in March 1864. The British shipbuilder Charles Mitchell submitted four different designs for the coastal defense vessels, two broadside ironclads and two turret ships. The Shipbuilding Technical Committee decided in August that the broadside designs would be based on the hull shape of the earlier Pervenets-class ironclad for better seaworthiness, but they would be armed with fewer, but more powerful guns, than the numerous smoothbore guns of the older ships. Two variants were worked out that differed in the fineness of the hull and draft.

In November the committee decided to revise the designs to use three gun turrets, each armed with a pair of massive American-designed 15-inch (381 mm) Rodman guns, although the armament was changed to 9-inch (229 mm) rifled muzzle-loading guns two months later. On 4 June 1865, Admiral Spiridov and Admiral Chichagov were ordered to the shallower-draft version of the two designs. Construction of the ships was repeatedly delayed by design changes and delayed deliveries of components. Both of the most significant design changes were related to the armor protection. Shortly after they were ordered the Admiralty Board realized that the specified 4.5-inch (114 mm) armor would be outclassed by the latest rifled gun and decided that the existing armor would be reinforced by an additional 1-inch (25 mm) armor plate and additional wooden backing inside the existing armor. The additional weight was offset by increasing the height of the hull by 12 inches (305 mm) which also deepened the ships' draft. The second change occurred after new 8-inch (203 mm) rifled guns were able to penetrate a replica of the armor scheme in June 1866. The Admiralty Board decided to significantly thicken the armor of the two ships and removed one gun turret to compensate for the weight of the extra armor in November. Numerous other changes flowed from this decision as the engine and boilers had to be moved forward about 8-foot (2 m) to maintain the ships' trim and two transverse bulkheads also had to be moved. This major change added over 270,000 rubles to the cost of the ships and added more delays as Russian ironworks had problems rolling the thicker armor plates.

The Admiral Spiridov-class monitors were significantly larger than their predecessors, the Charodeika class, and were 254 feet (77.4 m) long at the waterline. They had a beam of 43 feet (13.1 m) and a maximum draft of 21 feet (6.4 m). The ships were designed to displace 3,196 long tons (3,247 t), but turned out to be overweight and actually displaced 3,505 to 3,587 long tons (3,561 to 3,645 t). They were fitted with a plough-shaped ram. The Admiral Spiridovs had a double bottom and their hulls were subdivided by six main watertight bulkheads. Their crew consisted of 280 officers and crewmen.

=== Propulsion ===
The Admiral Spiridov class had a single two-cylinder horizontal direct-acting steam engine. It had a bore of 68 inches (1.7 m) and a stroke of 36 inches (0.91 m) and drove a single three-bladed 14-foot-9-inch (4.50 m) propeller. Steam was provided by four rectangular fire-tube boilers at a pressure of 1.76 atm (178 kPa; 26 psi). The engine was designed to produce a total of 2,000 indicated horsepower (1,500 kW) which gave the ships speeds between 9.1–9.5 knots (16.9–17.6 km/h; 10.5–10.9 mph) when they ran their initial sea trials in 1869. The monitors also had a donkey boiler for the small steam engine that powered the ventilation fans and pumps. The Admiral Spiridov class carried 280 long tons (284 t) of coal which gave them a range of about 1,400 nautical miles (2,600 km; 1,600 mi) at a speed of 10 knots. They were fitted with a light fore-and-aft sailing rig with three pole masts and a bowsprit. It had an area of 2,850 square feet (265 m^{2}) and its primary purpose was to steady the ships and assist in turning.

=== Armament ===
The monitors were ultimately designed to be armed with four Obukhov 9-inch rifled guns, a pair in each Coles-type turret. An armored bulkhead separated the guns inside each turret. In 1874–75 the guns were replaced by a single 11-inch (279 mm) gun in each turret, based on a Krupp design. During the Russo-Turkish War of 1877–78 a 9-inch mortar was fitted to attack the thin deck armor of enemy ships, but accuracy was poor and they were later removed, probably in the early 1880s. An improved, more powerful, 11-inch gun was installed aboard Admiral Chichagov during the 1880s, although Admiral Spiridov retained her original guns until 1902, if not for the rest of her career.

Light guns for use against torpedo boats were added to the Admiral Spiridov-class ships during the Russo-Turkish War when a pair of 4-pounder 3.4-inch (86 mm) guns were mounted on the roofs of each gun turret. Other guns known have been fitted included 2.5-inch (64 mm) Baranov quick-firing (QF) guns, 47-millimeter (1.9 in) QF Hotchkiss guns, and 37-millimeter (1.5 in) QF Hotchkiss five-barreled revolving cannon. The ships could also carry 12-15 mines intended to be used to create a secure anchorage.

=== Armor ===
The hull of the Admiral Spiridov-class monitors was completely covered by three strakes of wrought iron armor, the upper two were about 3 feet 8 inches (1.12 m) high and the lower one, below the waterline, was 3 feet 2 inches (0.97 m) high. The middle strake was 6.5 inches (165 mm) thick for a length of 150 feet (45.7 m) amidships and the other strakes were generally 5.5 inches (140 mm) thick (the upper strake was 6 inches (152 mm) thick abreast the turrets). The armor thinned to 3 inches (76 mm) aft and 3.5 inches (89 mm) forward of the main belt. This outermost layer of armor was backed by 9 inches of teak reinforced with angle irons and then came the 1-inch inner armor plates, backed in its turn by another 9 inches of teak.

The turrets had 6 inches of armor, except around the gun ports, where it thickened to 6.5 inches, reinforced by 12 inches of teak. The conning tower was 5 inches (127 mm) thick. The deck armor was in two layers with a total thickness of 1 inch that were separated by a layer of cloth or felt to better deflect the glancing hits expected. The upper layer was 0.625 inches (16 mm) thick and the lower was 0.375 inches (10 mm).

== Ships ==
Name	Namesake	Builder	Ordered	Laid down	Launched	Entered service
Admiral Spiridov	Grigory Spiridov	Semiannikov & Poletika Shipyard, Saint Petersburg	4 June 1865 (Note: All dates used in this article are New Style)	20 November 1866	28 August 1868	1869
Admiral Chichagov	Pavel Chichagov	Semiannikov & Poletika Shipyard, Saint Petersburg	4 June 1865	20 November 1866	13 October 1868	1869

== Construction and service ==
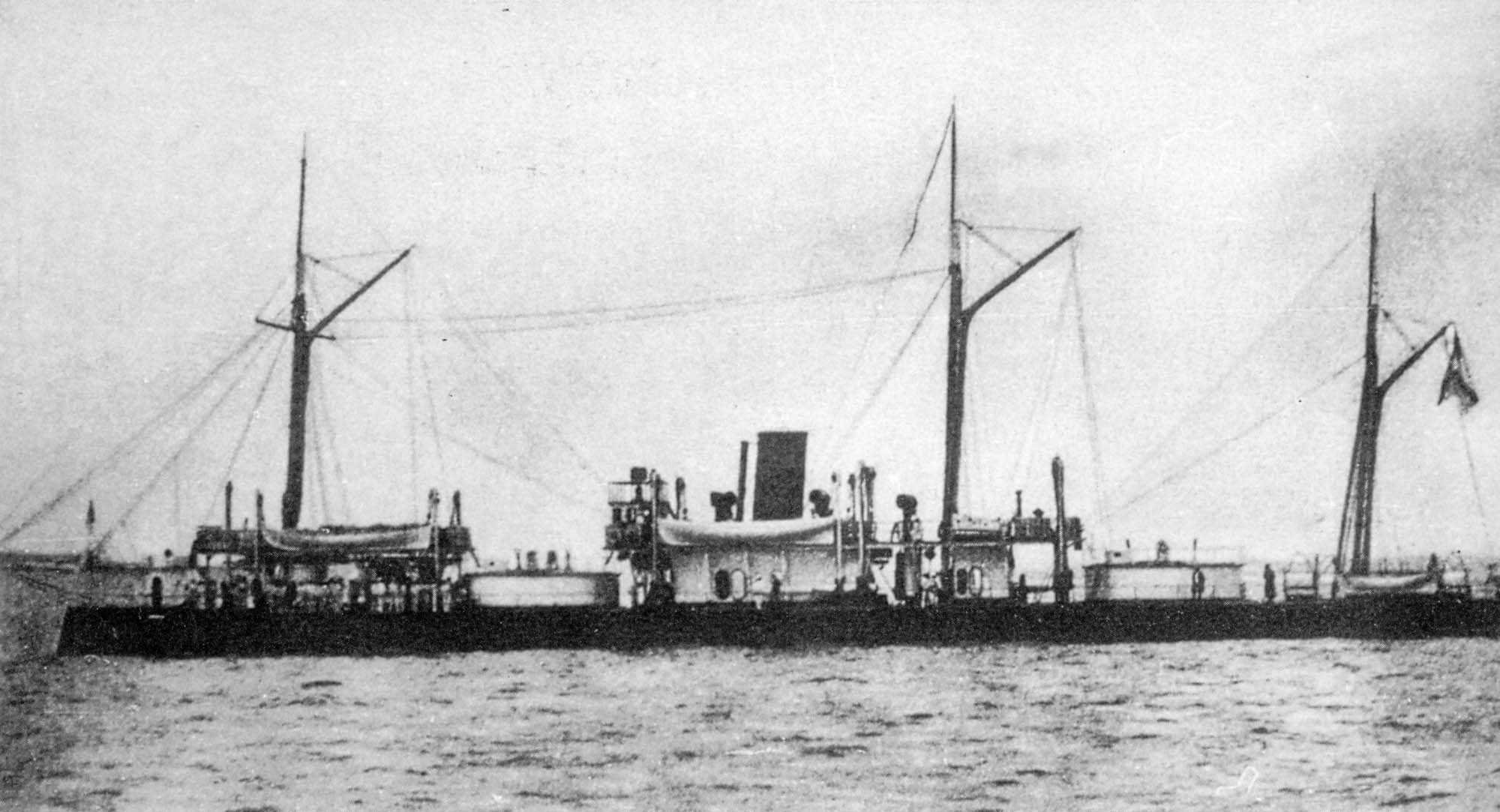
Admiral Spiridov at anchor

After launching, the sisters were transferred to Kronstadt for fitting out as the shallow waters around Saint Petersburg prevented deep-draft ships from being completed. This added more delays as the dockyard there lacked the equipment to efficiently fit out the ships. Both ships were assigned to the Baltic Fleet upon completion. They were not fully equipped until around 1872 and their trials continued until 1873. Admiral Spiridov accidentally rammed the monitor Admiral Lazarev in Kronstadt harbor in 1871, and her sister collided with the monitor Veschun four years later; neither ship was seriously damaged. Several days after the collision, Admiral Chichagov struck a sandbank at full speed. While not damaged in the incident, she was very firmly stuck and early attempts to pull her off failed, during which one seaman was killed and an officer badly wounded. The monitor had to be unloaded as much as possible and her forward guns were removed before she was freed from the sandbank, five days after running aground.

The ships received electric dynamos and searchlights were installed in the late 1870s. Admiral Chichagov served as the flagship for Captain 1st Rank Stepan Makarov during the 1885 naval maneuvers in the approaches to the Gulf of Riga and her boilers were replaced in two years later. Steam-powered steering gear was installed in the sisters in 1887 and they were reclassified as coast-defense ironclads on 13 February 1892. By this time, their role in Russian war plans was to defend the Gulf of Riga against an anticipated German amphibious landing. In 1900 they were transferred to the Kronstadt Engineering School as training ships before they were transferred to the Port of Kronstadt on 31 March 1907 for disposal. The sisters were stricken on 14 August and Admiral Spiridov became a stationary coal-storage barge while Admiral Chichagov was grounded near Reval and used as a target. Their subsequent fates are unknown.

== See also ==
- List of ironclads of Russia
