= Admiral Lazarev-class monitor =

Imperial Russian Navy warship

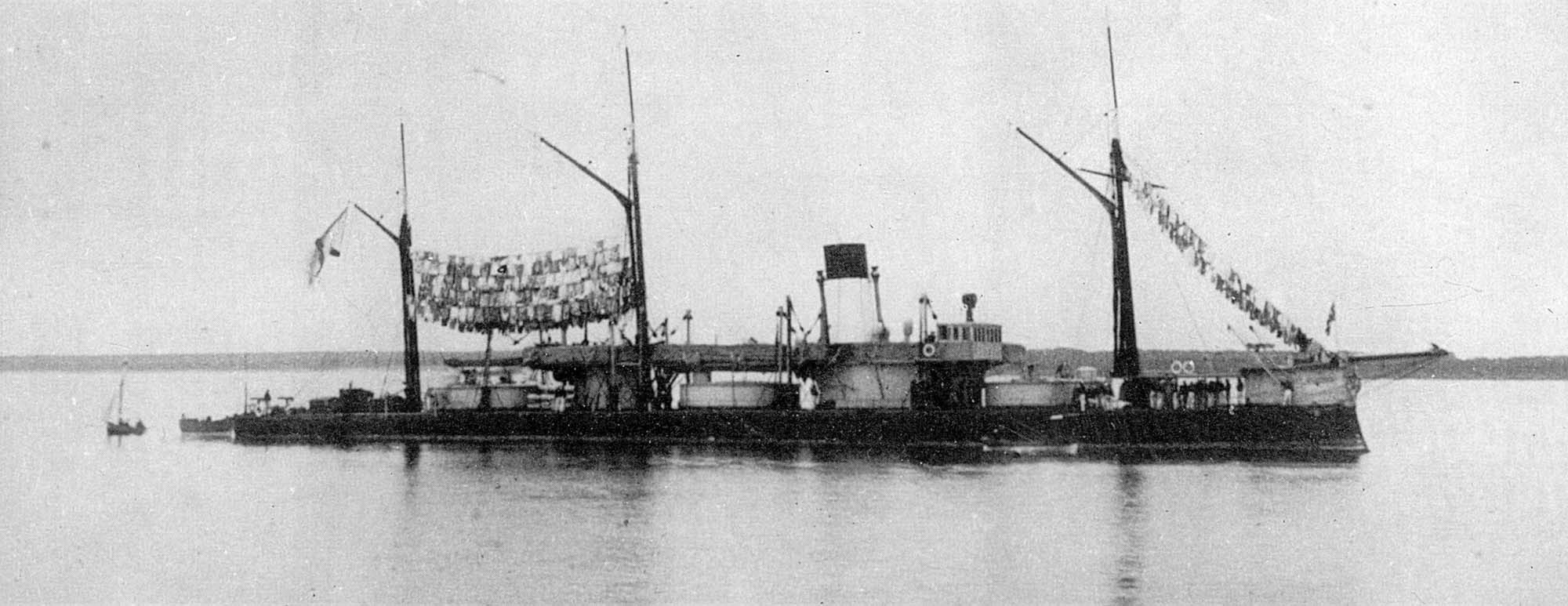
- Admiral Greig at anchor; the crew's laundry is drying on her rigging

Class overview
- Builders: Carr and MacPherson, Saint Petersburg
- Operators: Imperial Russian Navy
- Preceded by: Charodeika class
- Succeeded by: Admiral Spiridov class
- Built: 1866–1869
- In commission: 1869–1909
- Completed: 2
- Scrapped: 2

General characteristics (as built)
- Type: Monitor
- Displacement: 3,820–3,881 long tons (3,881–3,943 t)
- Length: 262 ft (79.9 m) (o/a)
- Beam: 43 ft (13.1 m)
- Draft: 21 ft (6.4 m)
- Installed power: 2,020 ihp (1,510 kW); 4 rectangular fire-tube boilers
- Propulsion: 1 Shaft; 1 Horizontal direct-action steam engine
- Speed: 10 knots (19 km/h; 12 mph)
- Range: 1,200–1,500 nmi (2,200–2,800 km; 1,400–1,700 mi) at 9 knots (17 km/h; 10 mph)
- Complement: 269–74 officers and crewmen
- Armament: 3 × twin 9-inch (229 mm) Rifled muzzle-loading guns
- Armor: Belt: 3–4.5 in (76–114 mm); Gun turrets: 6–6.5 in (152–165 mm); Conning tower: 5 in (127 mm); Deck: 1 in (25 mm)

The Admiral Lazarev class was a pair of monitors built for the Imperial Russian Navy in the late 1860s, which designated them as armored turret frigates. Four ships were ordered, but the last two were significantly modified during construction and became the separate Admiral Spiridov class. The sister ships were assigned to the Baltic Fleet upon completion and remained there for their entire careers. Aside from one accidental collision, their careers were uneventful. They were reclassified as coast-defense ironclads in 1892 before they became training ships later that decade. The Admiral Lazarevs were stricken from the Navy List in 1907 and 1909; both were sold for scrap in 1912.

== Design and description ==
By late 1863, the Russian Admiralty Board had begun planning for the second generation of ironclads to succeed those ships then under construction. They ordered eight ships, two fully rigged seagoing types and six coastal defense ships, in March 1864. The British shipbuilder Charles Mitchell submitted four different designs for the coastal defense vessels, two broadside ironclads and two turret ships. The Shipbuilding Technical Committee decided in August that the broadside designs would be based on the hull shape of the earlier Pervenets-class ironclad for better seaworthiness, but they would be armed with fewer, but more powerful guns, than the numerous smoothbore guns of the older ships. Two variants were worked out that differed in the fineness of the hull and draft.

In November 1864 the committee decided to revise the designs to use three gun turrets, each armed with a pair of massive American-designed 15-inch (381 mm) Rodman guns, although the armament was changed to 9-inch (229 mm) rifled muzzle-loading guns two months later. On 24 May 1865, Admiral Lazarev and Admiral Grieg were ordered to the deeper-draft version of the two designs, while Admiral Chicagov and Admiral Spiridov used the shallower-draft version. Construction of the ships was repeatedly delayed by design changes and delayed deliveries of components. Both of the most significant design changes were related to the armor protection. Shortly after they were ordered the Admiralty Board realized that the specified 4.5-inch (114 mm) armor would be outclassed by the latest rifled gun and decided that the existing armor would be reinforced by an additional 1-inch (25 mm) armor plate and additional wooden backing inside the existing armor. The additional weight was offset by increasing the height of the hull by 12 inches (305 mm) which also deepened the ships' draft. The second change occurred after new 8-inch (203 mm) rifled guns were able to penetrate a replica of the armor scheme in June 1866. The Admiralty Board decided to significantly thicken the armor of all four ships and remove one gun turret to compensate for the weight of the extra armor in November, but Admiral Lazarev and Admiral Grieg were too far advanced to make the change and only the other two ships were modified.

The Admiral Lazarev-class monitors were significantly larger than their predecessors, the Charodeika class, and had an overall length of 262 feet (79.9 m), a beam of 43 feet (13.1 m) and a maximum draft of 21 feet (6.4 m). The ships were designed to displace 3,505 long tons (3,561 t), but turned out to be overweight and actually displaced 3,820 to 3,881 long tons (3,881 to 3,943 t). They were fitted with a plough-shaped ram. The Admiral Lazarevs had a double bottom and their hulls were subdivided by six main watertight bulkheads. Their crew consisted of 269–74 officers and crewmen.

=== Propulsion ===
The Admiral Lazarev-class ships had a single two-cylinder horizontal direct-acting steam engine. It had a bore of 68 inches (1.7 m) and a stroke of 36 inches (0.91 m) and drove a single three-bladed 15-foot (4.6 m) propeller. Steam was provided by four rectangular fire-tube boilers at a pressure of 1.76 atm (178 kPa; 26 psi). The engine was designed to produce a total of 2,020 indicated horsepower (1,510 kW) which gave the ships speeds between 9.54–10.4 knots (17.67–19.26 km/h; 10.98–11.97 mph) when they ran their initial sea trials in 1871. The monitors also had a donkey boiler for the small steam engine that powered the ventilation fans and pumps. The Admiral Lazarev class carried 260 long tons (264 t) of coal which gave them a range of about 1,200–1,500 nautical miles (2,200–2,800 km; 1,400–1,700 mi) at a speed of 9 knots. They were fitted with a light fore-and-aft sailing rig with three pole masts and a bowsprit. It had an area of 2,850 square feet (265 m^{2}) and its primary purpose was to steady the ships and assist in turning.

=== Armament ===
The monitors were ultimately designed to be armed with six 20-caliber, Obukhov 9-inch rifled guns, a pair in each Coles-type turret. The guns fired 269–273-pound (122–124 kg) shells with a maximum muzzle velocity of 1,400 feet per second (440 m/s) that gave them a range of 4,051 yards (3,704 m). Around 1874–1875 the guns were replaced by three 11-inch (279 mm) rifled guns, based on a Krupp design. The shells fired by this gun were nearly twice as heavy as those used by the smaller gun at 494 pounds (224 kg). Although their muzzle velocity was reduced to their 1,290 feet per second (392 m/s), the range remained the same. During the Russo-Turkish War of 1877–1878, a 9-inch mortar was fitted to attack the thin deck armor of enemy ships, but accuracy was poor and they were later removed, probably in the early 1880s. An improved, more powerful, 22-caliber, 11-inch gun was installed aboard the sister ships during the 1880s. Its 551–562-pound (250–255 kg) shells had a muzzle velocity of 1,490 feet per second (454 m/s), but its range decreased to 3,802 yards (3,477 m).

Light guns for use against torpedo boats were added to the Admiral Lazarev class during the Russo-Turkish War when a pair of 4-pounder 3.4-inch (86 mm) guns were mounted on the roofs of the fore and aft gun turrets and a 44-millimeter (1.7 in), 4-barreled Engstrem quick-firing (QF) gun. By the early 1890s, the light armament consisted of one or two 2.5-inch (64 mm) Baranov QF guns, five 47-millimeter (1.9 in) QF Hotchkiss guns, replacing the 4-pounders, and a pair 37-millimeter (1.5 in) QF Hotchkiss five-barreled revolving cannon. The ships could also carry 12-15 mines intended to be used to create a secure anchorage.

=== Armor ===
The hull of the Admiral Lazarev-class monitors was completely covered by three strakes of wrought iron armor, the upper two were about 3 feet 8 inches (1.12 m) high and the lower one, below the waterline, was 3 feet 2 inches (0.97 m) high. The upper two strakes were 4.5 inches (114 mm) thick for a length of 150 feet (45.7 m) amidships and the other strake was 4 inches (102 mm) thick. The armor thinned to 3 inches (76 mm) aft and 3.5 inches (89 mm) forward of the main belt. This outermost layer of armor was backed by 9 inches of teak reinforced with angle irons and then came the 1-inch (25 mm) inner armor plates, backed in its turn by another 9 inches of teak.

The turrets had 6 inches (152 mm) inches of armor, except around the gun ports, where it thickened to 6.5 inches (165 mm), reinforced by 12 inches (305 mm) of teak. The conning tower was 5 inches (127 mm) thick. The deck armor was in two layers with a total thickness of 1 inch that were separated by a layer of cloth or felt to better deflect the glancing hits expected. The upper layer was 0.625 inches (16 mm) thick and the lower was 0.375 inches (10 mm).

== Ships ==
Ship	Namesake	Builder	Ordered	Laid down	Launched	Entered service	Fate
Admiral Lazarev	Mikhail Lazarev	Carr and MacPherson, Saint Petersburg	24 May 1865 (Note: All dates used in this article are New Style)	29 May 1867	21 September 1867	1872	Scrapped, 1912
Admiral Greig	Samuel Greig	New Admiralty Shipyard, Saint Petersburg	1865	10 May 1866	30 October 1867	1872	Sold for scrap, sank under tow, October 1912

== Construction and service ==
After launching, the sisters were transferred to Kronstadt for fitting out as the shallow waters around Saint Petersburg prevented deep-draft ships from being completed. This added more delays as the dockyard there lacked the equipment to efficiently fit out the ships. Both ships were assigned to the Baltic Fleet upon completion and they were not fully equipped until around 1872. The monitor Admiral Spiridov accidentally rammed Admiral Lazarev in Kronstadt harbor on 22 October 1871. The former was only slightly damaged, but the latter had a 7-square-foot (0.65 m^{2}) hole punched in its hull. Water poured in and the ship took on a list of 8° and nearly capsized before other ships in the harbor could use their pumps to reduce the flooding. The ship's watertight bulkheads proved to be poorly caulked and sealed and the commission that investigated the accident recommended that the bulkheads be tested during construction by intentionally flooding them. The Navy ignored this recommendation, which directly led to the loss of the coast-defense ship Gangut in 1897. Another recommendation which was followed was to attach all of the ship's pumps to the bilges to allow a flooded compartment to be pumped out as quickly as possible. This modification was tested aboard Admiral Lazarevin 1872 and became standard practice for the navy.

The ships received electric dynamos and searchlights were installed in the late 1870s. Their boilers were replaced during the winter of 1881–1882. Steam-powered steering gear was installed in the sisters in 1887 and they were reclassified as coast-defense ironclads on 13 February 1892. By this time, their role in Russian war plans was to defend the Gulf of Riga against an anticipated German amphibious landing. A few years later they often served with the fleet's Artillery Training Detachment. Admiral Lazarev was transferred to the port of Libava as a guardship during the Russo-Japanese War of 1904–1905.

== See also ==
- List of ironclads of Russia
