= Russian monitor Admiral Chichagov =

Admiral Spiridov-class warship

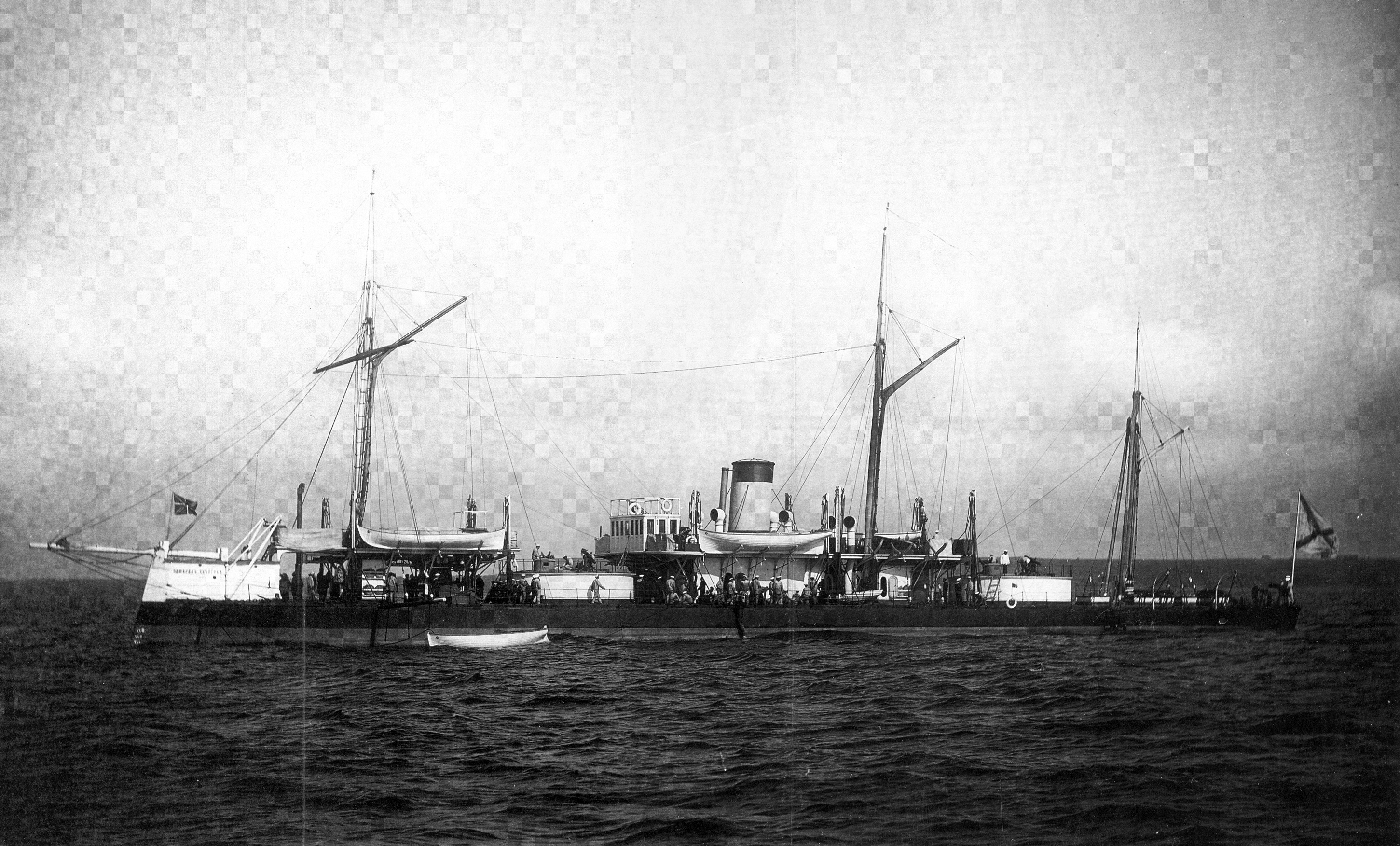
- Admiral Chichagov at anchor

History

Russian Empire
- Name: Admiral Chicagov
- Namesake: Admiral Vasily Chichagov
- Ordered: 4 June 1865 (Note: All dates used in this article are New Style)
- Builder: Semiannikov & Poletika Shipyard, Saint Petersburg
- Cost: 1,177,500 rubles
- Laid down: 20 November 1866
- Launched: 13 October 1868
- Decommissioned: 31 March 1907
- In service: 1869
- Reclassified: As a coast-defense ironclad, 13 February 1892
- Stricken: 14 August 1907
- Fate: Unknown

General characteristics (as built)
- Class & type: Admiral Spiridov-class monitor
- Displacement: 3,505–3,587 long tons (3,561–3,645 t)
- Length: 254 ft (77.4 m) (waterline)
- Beam: 43 ft (13.1 m)
- Draft: 21 ft (6.4 m)
- Installed power: 2,000 ihp (1,500 kW); 4 rectangular fire-tube boilers
- Propulsion: 1 Shaft, 1 direct-action steam engine
- Speed: 10 knots (19 km/h; 12 mph)
- Range: 1,400 nmi (2,600 km; 1,600 mi) at 10 knots (19 km/h; 12 mph)
- Complement: 280 officers and crewmen
- Armament: 2 × twin 9-inch (229 mm) Rifled muzzle-loading guns; 12–15 mines
- Armor: Belt: 3–7.5 in (76–191 mm); Gun turrets: 6–6.5 in (152–165 mm); Conning tower: 5 in (127 mm); Deck: 1 in (25 mm)

The Russian monitor Admiral Chichagov (Russian: Адмирал Чичагов) was the second and last of the two Admiral Spiridov-class monitors built for the Imperial Russian Navy in the late 1860s. Upon completion, the ship was assigned to the Baltic Fleet and remained there for her entire career. Aside from an incident where she ran aground, her service was uneventful. The sister ships were reclassified as coast-defense ironclads in 1892 before they became training ships in 1900. Admiral Spiridov was stricken from the Navy List in 1907 and became a target ship. Her ultimate fate is unknown.

== Design and description ==
The Admiral Spiridov-class monitors were significantly larger than their predecessors, the Charodeika class, and were 254 feet (77.4 m) long at the waterline. They had a beam of 43 feet (13.1 m) and a maximum draft of 21 feet (6.4 m). The ships were designed to displace 3,196 long tons (3,247 t), but turned out to be overweight and actually displaced 3,505 to 3,587 long tons (3,561 to 3,645 t). Their crew consisted of 280 officers and crewmen. The Admiral Spiridov class had a single two-cylinder horizontal direct-acting steam engine. It drove a single propeller using steam provided by four rectangular fire-tube boilers. The engine was designed to produce a total of 2,000 indicated horsepower (1,500 kW) which gave the ships speeds between 9.1–9.5 knots (16.9–17.6 km/h; 10.5–10.9 mph) when they ran their initial sea trials in 1869. The ship carried 280 long tons (280 t) of coal which gave her a range of 1,400 nautical miles (2,600 km; 1,600 mi) at full speed. She was fitted with three masts in a light fore-and-aft rig to steady her and aid in maneuvering.

The monitors were ultimately designed to be armed with four Obukhov 9-inch rifled guns, a pair in each turret. In 1874–75 the guns were replaced by a single 11-inch (279 mm) gun. During the Russo-Turkish War of 1877–78, a 9-inch mortar was fitted to attack the thin deck armor of enemy ships, but accuracy was poor and they were later removed, probably in the early 1880s. An improved, more powerful, 11-inch gun was installed aboard Admiral Chichagov during the 1880s. Light guns for use against torpedo boats were added to the Admiral Spiridov-class ships during the Russo-Turkish War when a pair of 4-pounder 3.4-inch (86 mm) guns were mounted on the roofs of each gun turret. A variety of other small guns are known to have been fitted, but details are lacking. The ships could also carry 12 to 15 mines.

The hull of the Admiral Spiridov-class monitors was completely covered by wrought-iron armor that was 5.5 to 6.5 inches (140 to 165 mm) thick amidships and thinned to 3.25 inches (83 mm) aft and 3.5 inches (89 mm) forward of the main belt. The turrets had 6 inches of armor, except around the gun ports, which thickened to 6.5 inches. The conning tower was 5 inches (127 mm) thick and the deck armor was in two layers with a total thickness of 1 inch.

== Construction and service ==
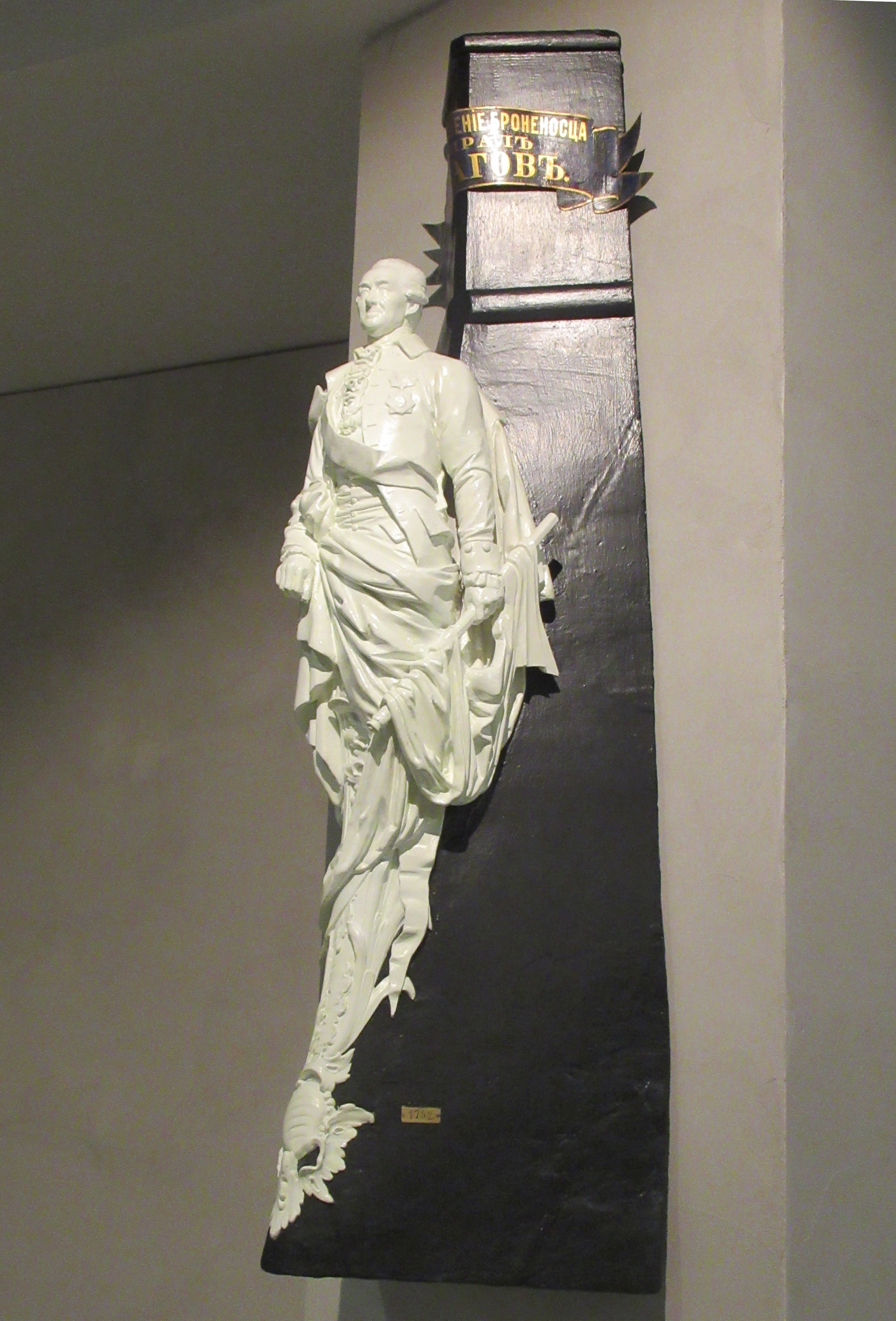
Admiral Chichagov's figurehead

Admiral Chichagov, named for Admiral Vasily Chichagov, was ordered on 4 June 1865 from the Semiannikov & Poletika Shipyard, Saint Petersburg, although the formal keel-laying was not until 20 November 1866. Construction was delayed by changes to the design and late deliveries of components. She was launched on 28 August 1868 and then transferred to Kronstadt for fitting out as the shallow waters around Saint Petersburg prevented deep-draft ships from being completed. This added more delays as the dockyard there lacked the equipment to efficiently fit out the ships, and she officially entered service in 1869 at the cost of 1,177,500 rubles.

On 20 July 1870, Admiral Chichagov struck a sandbank near Koivisto at full speed. While not damaged in the incident, she was very firmly stuck and, an attempt by the armored frigate Sevastopol to pull her off failed two days later when the hawser snapped. The Russians started to off-load coal and equipment onto the low deck of the Strelets in preparation for another attempt. While rigging another hawser aboard Strelets, it moved unexpectedly, badly injuring the ship's executive officer and a bosun, who later died of his injuries. The subsequent attempt by Sevastopol also failed, so several barges and a floating crane were summoned from Kronstadt the next day. As much weight as possible was transferred to the barges, including her forward guns, and she was successfully pulled free on 25 July. Admiral Chichagov was not damaged in the incident.

On 18 July 1875, she accidentally collided with the monitor Veschun, but neither ship was seriously damaged. Admiral Chichagov served as the flagship for Captain 1st Rank Stepan Makarov during the 1885 fleet maneuvers in approaching the Gulf of Riga. She was reclassified as a coast-defense ironclad on 13 February 1892. By this time, her role in Russian war plans was to defend the Gulf of Riga against an anticipated German amphibious landing. In 1900, Admiral Chichagov was assigned to the Kronstadt Engineering School as a training ship. However, she was transferred to Libau during the Russo-Japanese War of 1904–05 to reinforce the port's defenses. The ship was transferred to the Port of Kronstadt on 31 March 1907 for disposal. The ship was stricken on 14 August, and her hulk was used as a target near Reval. Her ultimate fate is unknown.
