= Russian monitor Admiral Lazarev =

Russian lead ship of Admiral Lazarev class

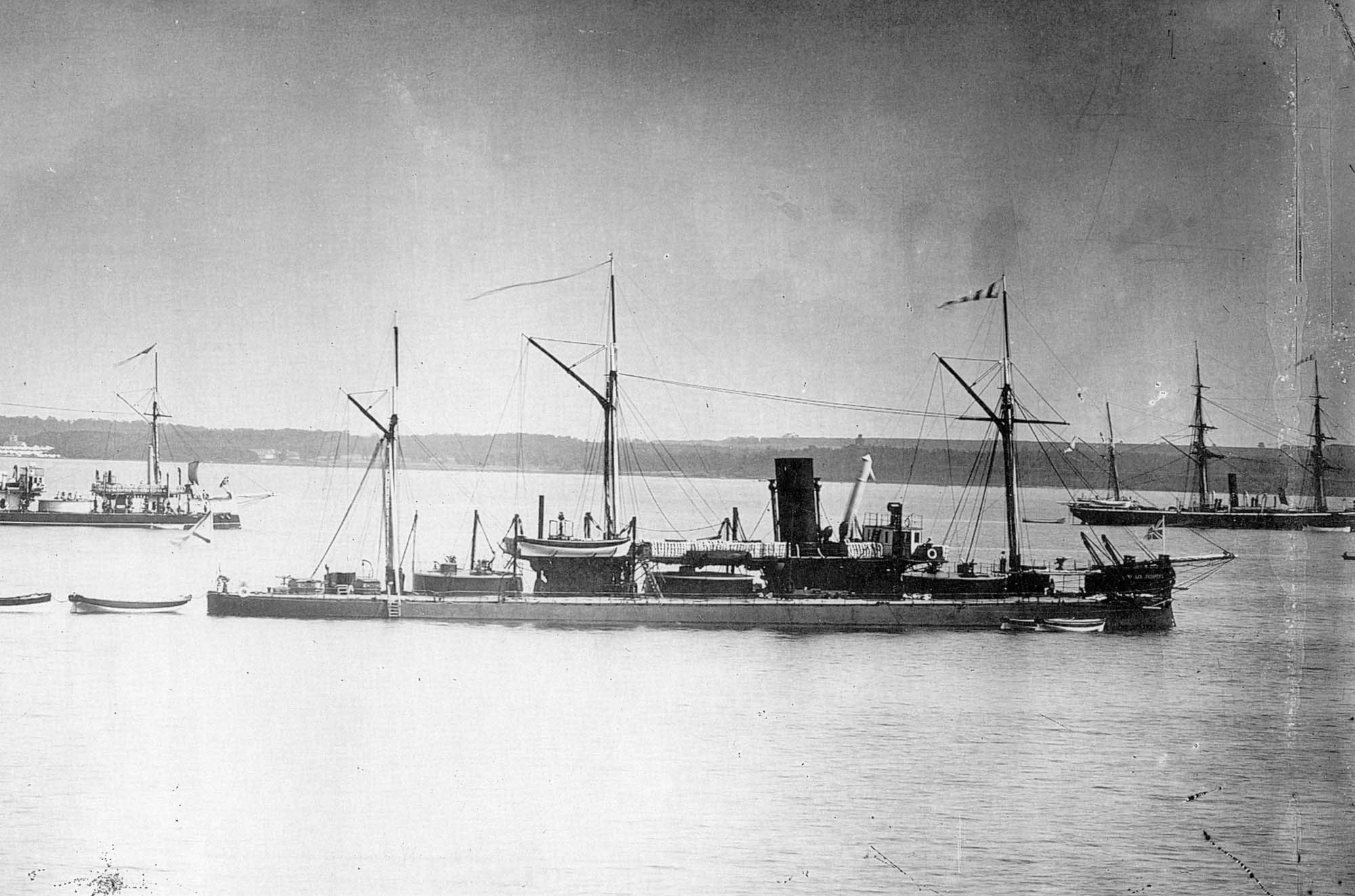
- Admiral Lazarev at anchor in the Neva River, Saint Petersburg

History

Russian Empire
- Name: Admiral Lazarev
- Namesake: Mikhail Lazarev
- Ordered: 24 May 1865 (Note: All dates used in this article are New Style.)
- Builder: Carr and MacPherson, Saint Petersburg
- Cost: 1,289,300 rubles
- Laid down: 29 May 1867
- Launched: 21 September 1867
- In service: 1872
- Reclassified: As coastal-defense ship, 13 February 1892
- Stricken: 14 August 1907
- Fate: Sold for scrap, sank under tow, October 1912

General characteristics (as built)
- Type: Monitor
- Displacement: 3,820–3,881 long tons (3,881–3,943 t)
- Length: 262 ft (79.9 m) (o/a)
- Beam: 43 ft (13.1 m)
- Draft: 21 ft (6.4 m)
- Installed power: 2,020 ihp (1,510 kW); 4 rectangular fire-tube boilers
- Propulsion: 1 Shaft; 1 Horizontal direct-action steam engine
- Speed: 10 knots (19 km/h; 12 mph)
- Range: 1,200–1,500 nmi (2,200–2,800 km; 1,400–1,700 mi) at 9 knots (17 km/h; 10 mph)
- Complement: 269–74 officers and crewmen
- Armament: 3 × twin 9-inch (229 mm) rifled muzzle-loading guns
- Armor: Belt: 3–4.5 in (76–114 mm); Gun turrets: 6–6.5 in (152–165 mm); Conning tower: 5 in (127 mm); Deck: 1 in (25 mm)

The Russian monitor Admiral Lazarev was the name ship of her class of monitors built for the Imperial Russian Navy in the late 1860s. She was assigned to the Baltic Fleet upon completion and remained there for her entire career. Aside from one accidental collision in 1871, her service was uneventful. The ship was reclassified as coast-defense ironclad in 1892 and often served as a training ship. There was an unsuccessful proposal to convert her into an aircraft carrier in 1910. Admiral Lazarev was stricken from the Navy List in 1907 and sold for scrap in 1912. She sank while under tow to Germany later that year.

== Design and description ==
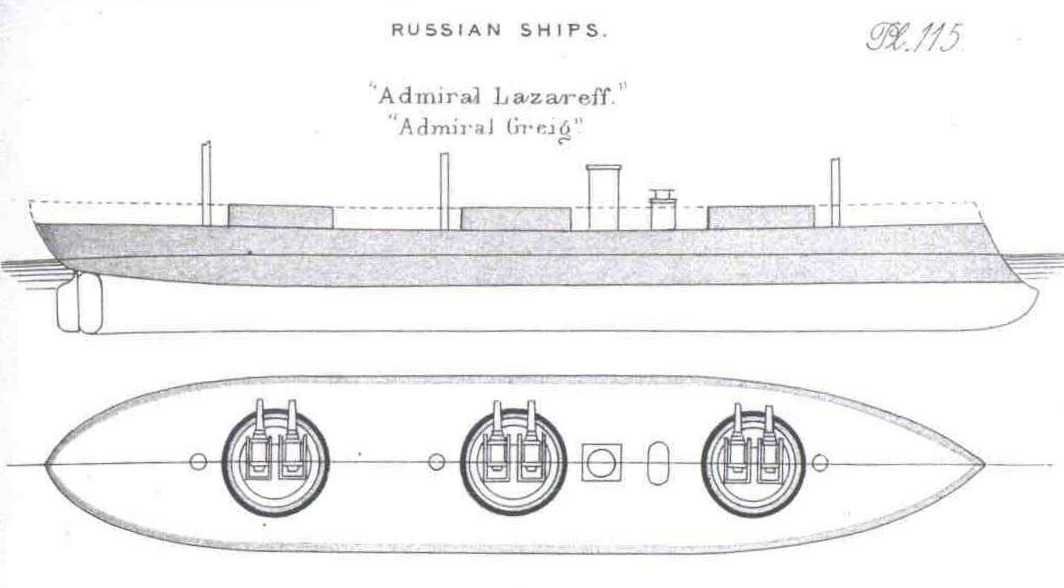
Right elevation and plan from Brassey's Naval Annual 1888

The Admiral Lazarev-class monitors were significantly larger than their predecessors, the Charodeika class, and had an overall length of 262 feet (79.9 m), a beam of 43 feet (13.1 m) and a maximum draft of 21 feet (6.4 m). The ships were designed to displace 3,505 long tons (3,561 t), but turned out to be overweight and actually displaced 3,820 to 3,881 long tons (3,881 to 3,943 t). They were fitted with a plough-shaped ram. Their crew consisted of between 269–274 officers and crewmen. The Admiral Lazarev-class ships had a single two-cylinder horizontal direct-acting steam engine that drove a single propeller, using steam provided by four rectangular fire-tube boilers. The engine was designed to produce a total of 2,020 indicated horsepower (1,510 kW) which gave a lightly loaded Admiral Lazarev a speed of 10.4 knots (19.3 km/h; 12.0 mph) from 2,004 ihp (1,494 kW) when she ran her sea trials in October 1871. They had a range of about 1,200–1,500 nautical miles (2,200–2,800 km; 1,400–1,700 mi) at a speed of 9 knots (17 km/h; 10 mph) and were fitted with a light fore-and-aft sailing rig to steady them and aid in maneuvering.

=== Armament ===
The monitors were originally designed to be armed with six 20-caliber Obukhov 11-inch (279 mm) rifled muzzle-loading guns, a pair in each Coles-type turret. Around 1874–1875 the guns were replaced by three 17-caliber, 11-inch rifled guns, based on a Krupp design. During the Russo-Turkish War of 1877–1878, a 9-inch mortar was fitted to attack the thin deck armor of enemy ships, but accuracy was poor and it was later removed, probably in the early 1880s. A more powerful, 22-caliber, 11-inch gun was installed aboard Admiral Lazarev and her sister ship Admiral Greig during the 1880s.

Light guns for use against torpedo boats were added to the Admiral Lazarev class during the Russo-Turkish War when a pair of 4-pounder 3.4-inch (86 mm) guns were mounted on the roofs of the fore and aft gun turrets and a 44-millimeter (1.7 in), 4-barreled Engstrem quick-firing (QF) gun. By the early 1890s, Admiral Lazarev's light armament consisted of two 2.5-inch (64 mm) Baranov QF guns, five 47-millimeter (1.9 in) QF Hotchkiss guns, replacing the 4-pounders, and a pair of 37-millimeter (1.5 in) QF Hotchkiss five-barreled revolving cannon. The monitors could also carry 12–15 mines intended to be used to create a secure anchorage.

=== Armor ===
The hull of the Admiral Lazarev-class monitors was completely covered by wrought iron armor that was 4–4.5 inches (102–114 mm) thick amidships and thinned to 3 inches (76 mm) aft and 3.5 inches (89 mm) forward of the main belt. The turrets had 6 inches (152 mm) of armor, except around the gun ports, where it thickened to 6.5 inches (165 mm). The conning tower was 5 inches (127 mm) thick and the deck armor was in two layers with a total thickness of 1 inch.

== Construction and service ==
Admiral Lazarev was named for Admiral Mikhail Lazarev, who circumnavigated the globe, taking part in the discovery of Antarctica, and later became commander of the Black Sea Fleet. The monitor was ordered on 24 May 1865 from the Carr and MacPherson Shipyard, Saint Petersburg, although the formal keel-laying was not until 29 May 1867. Construction was delayed by changes to the design and late deliveries of components. She was launched on 21 September and then transferred to Kronstadt for fitting out as the shallow waters around Saint Petersburg prevented deep-draft ships from being completed. This added more delays as the dockyard there lacked the equipment to efficiently fit out the ships, and she officially entered service in 1872 at the cost of 1,289,300 rubles.

The ship was assigned to the Baltic Fleet upon completion, but she was not fully equipped until around 1872. Admiral Lazarev was accidentally rammed by the monitor Admiral Spiridov in Kronstadt harbor on 22 October 1871 and had a 7-square-foot (0.65 m^{2}) hole punched in her hull below the waterline by the latter's ram. A large amount of water flooded in and Admiral Lazarev took on an eight degree list as it leaked through the poorly sealed watertight bulkheads, but nearby ships were able to pump out the water before she capsized.

The accident prompted an investigation that concluded that the quality control of the riveting and caulking of the watertight bulkheads needed to be improved and it recommended testing that by flooding the interior compartments during construction. That recommendation was not followed until after the loss of the Russian coast defense ship Gangut in a similar incident in 1897. In the meantime Admiral Lazarev was fitted with an improved bilge system for evaluation, designed by Lieutenant Stepan Makarov, that connected all of the ship's pumps to the main bilge drain. This proved successful and it became a standard feature of later Russian ships.

The ship had her boilers replaced in 1881–1882 and again around 1900–1903, possibly with cylindrical boilers. She was reclassified as a coast-defense ironclad on 13 February 1892 and frequently served with the Artillery Training Detachment of the Baltic Fleet. During the Russo-Japanese War of 1904–1905, Admiral Lazarev was deployed to Libava, Latvia, to reinforce the defenses there. The ship was stricken on 14 August 1907 although one naval architect proposed a conversion into a flush-decked aircraft carrier in July 1910. The turrets and superstructure would be removed and replaced by a full-length flight deck, measuring 251 by 49 feet (77 by 15 m), supported on stanchions above the original deck. The aircraft would be stowed below the flight deck and a small navigation bridge fitted there as well. The funnel would be split and redirected to exhaust on each side outboard of the flight deck. This may have been the first serious proposal by a designer for an aircraft carrier that utilized most of the features of modern carriers. Although perfectly feasible given the low take-off and landing speeds of the aircraft of the day, the proposal was not accepted, possibly because it would have been relatively expensive at a time when the Naval Ministry was struggling to finance the Gangut-class dreadnought battleships and other modern ships. Admiral Lazarev was sold to German shipbreakers. She sank in the Baltic Sea in October 1912 while under tow.
