= First Russian Society of Communist Agricultural Workers =

The First Russian Society of Communist Agricultural Workers was organised early in 1918 on the initiative of workers at the Obukhov Factory in Petrograd, Russia. Lenin supported the formation of the organisation. In March 1918, members of the society with their families went to Kazakhstan, where they settled and were given land to cultivate. Civil war prevented the development of the Petrograd workers’ initiative. The communards failed to reap even their first harvest. Kulaks and White Cossacks attacked the commune, forcing it to break up.
