= Soviet cruiser Admiral Lazarev =

Soviet Sverdlov-class cruiser

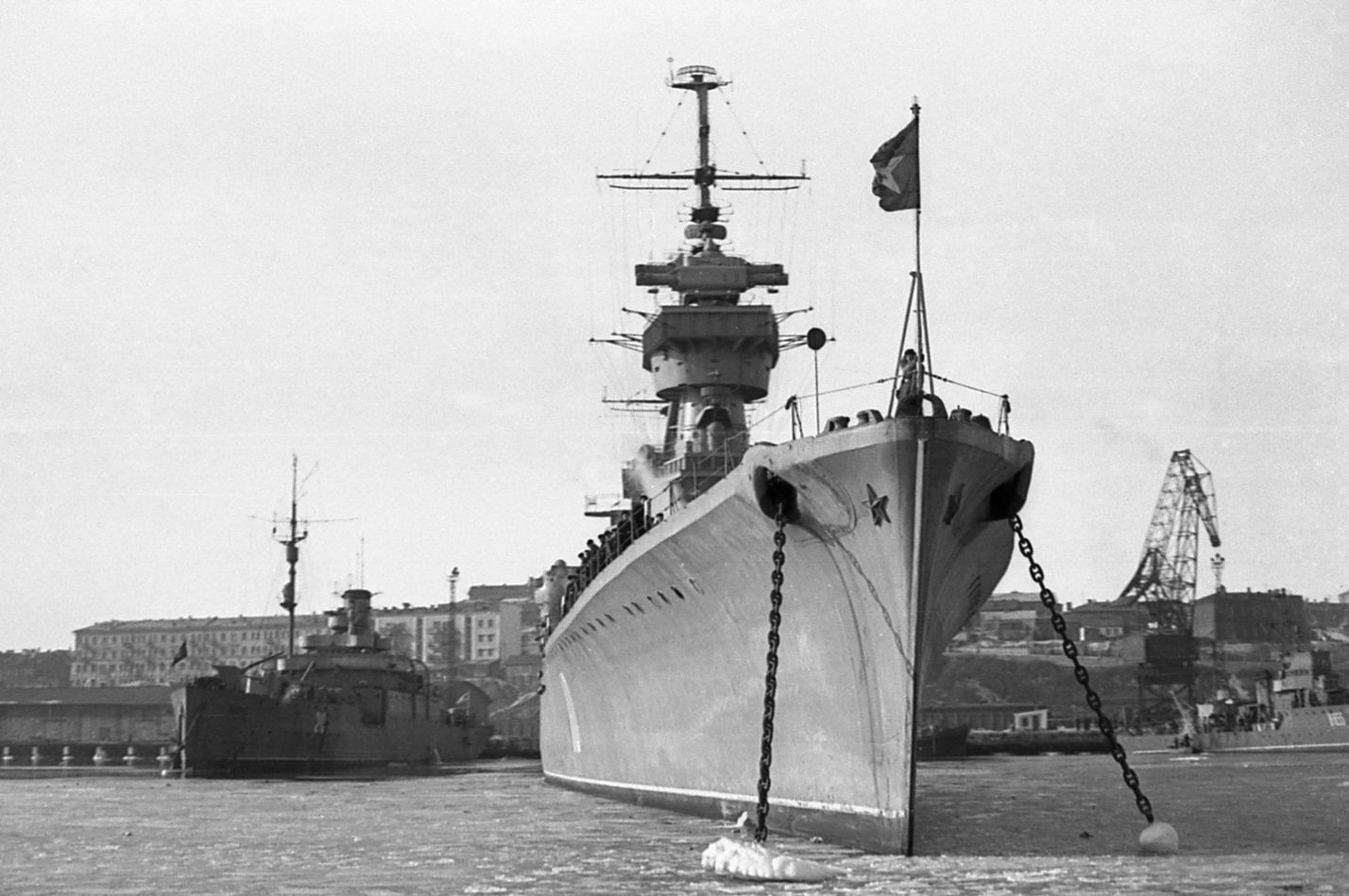
- Admiral Lazarev in 1957

History

Soviet Union
- Name: Admiral Lazarev; (Адмирал Лазарев)
- Namesake: Mikhail Lazarev
- Ordered: 9 November 1950
- Builder: Admiralty Shipyard, Leningrad
- Yard number: 626
- Laid down: 6 February 1951
- Launched: 29 June 1952
- Commissioned: 30 December 1953
- Recommissioned: 18 March 1972
- Decommissioned: 12 October 1986
- Stricken: 11 February 1988
- Identification: See Pennant numbers
- Fate: Scrapped, 1991

General characteristics
- Class & type: Sverdlov-class cruiser
- Displacement: 13,600 tonnes (13,385 long tons) standard; 16,640 tonnes (16,377 long tons) full load
- Length: 210 m (689 ft 0 in) overall; 205 m (672 ft 7 in) waterline
- Beam: 22 m (72 ft 2 in)
- Draught: 6.9 m (22 ft 8 in)
- Propulsion: 2 × shaft geared steam turbines; 6 × boilers, 110,000 hp (82,000 kW)
- Speed: 32.5 knots (60.2 km/h; 37.4 mph)
- Range: 9,000 nmi (17,000 km; 10,000 mi) at 18 knots (33 km/h; 21 mph)
- Complement: 1,250
- Armament: 4 × triple 15.2 cm (6.0 in)/57 cal B-38 guns in Mk5-bis turrets; 6 × twin 10 cm (3.9 in)/56 cal Model 1934 guns in SM-5-1 mounts; 16 × twin 3.7 cm (1.5 in) AA guns in V-11M mounts; 2 × quintuple 533 mm (21.0 in) torpedo tubes in PTA-53-68-bis mounts
- Armour: Belt: 100 mm (3.9 in); Conning tower: 150 mm (5.9 in); Deck: 50 mm (2.0 in); Turrets: 175 mm (6.9 in) front, 65 mm (2.6 in) sides, 60 mm (2.4 in) rear, 75 mm (3.0 in) roof; Barbettes: 130 mm (5.1 in); Bulkheads: 100–120 mm (3.9–4.7 in)

Admiral Lazarev was a Sverdlov-class cruiser of the Soviet Navy.

== Development and design ==
The Sverdlov-class cruisers, Soviet designation Project 68bis, were the last conventional gun cruisers built for the Soviet Navy. They were built in the 1950s and were based on Soviet, German, and Italian designs and concepts developed prior to the Second World War. They were modified to improve their sea keeping capabilities, allowing them to run at high speed in the rough waters of the North Atlantic. The basic hull was more modern and had better armor protection than the vast majority of the post Second World War gun cruiser designs built and deployed by peer nations. They also carried an extensive suite of modern radar equipment and anti-aircraft artillery. The Soviets originally planned to build 40 ships in the class, which would be supported by the Stalingrad-class battlecruisers and aircraft carriers.

The Sverdlov class displaced 13,600 tons standard and 16,640 tons at full load. They were 210 metres (689 ft 0 in) long overall and 205 metres (672 ft 7 in) long at the waterline. They had a beam of 22 metres (72 ft 2 in) and draught of 6.9 metres (22 ft 8 in) and typically had a complement of 1,250. The hull was a completely welded new design and the ships had a double bottom for over 75% of their length. The ship also had twenty-three watertight bulkheads. The Sverdlovs had six boilers providing steam to two shaft geared steam turbines generating 118,100 shaft horsepower (88,100 kW). This gave the ships a maximum speed of 32.5 knots (60.2 km/h; 37.4 mph). The cruisers had a range of 9,000 nautical miles (17,000 km; 10,000 mi) at 18 knots (33 km/h; 21 mph).

Sverdlov-class cruisers main armament included twelve 152 mm (6 in)/57 cal B-38 guns mounted in four triple Mk5-bis turrets. They also had twelve 100 mm (3.9 in)/56 cal Model 1934 guns in six twin SM-5-1 mounts. For anti-aircraft weaponry, the cruisers had thirty-two 37 mm (1.5 in) anti-aircraft guns in sixteen twin mounts and were also equipped with ten 533 mm (21 in) torpedo tubes in two mountings of five each.

The Sverdlovs had 100 mm (3.9 in) belt armor and had a 50 mm (2.0 in) armored deck. The turrets were shielded by 175 mm (6.9 in) armor and the conning tower, by 150 mm (5.9 in) armor.

The cruisers' ultimate radar suite included one 'Big Net' or 'Top Trough' air search radar, one 'High Sieve' or 'Low Sieve' air search radar, one 'Knife Rest' air search radar and one 'Slim Net' air search radar. For navigational radar they had one 'Don-2' or 'Neptune' model. For fire control purposes the ships were equipped with two 'Sun Visor' radars, two 'Top Bow' 152 mm gun radars and eight 'Egg Cup' gun radars. For electronic countermeasures the ships were equipped with two 'Watch Dog' ECM systems.

== Construction and career ==
The ship was built at Admiralty Shipyard in Leningrad and was launched on 29 June 1952 and commissioned on 30 December 1953.

On 18 February 1954, she entered the 8th Navy.

On 24 December 1955, she was transferred to the Baltic Fleet.

On 27 February 1956, she was transferred to the Northern Fleet.

Summer-autumn 1956, crossing the Northern Sea Route from Severomorsk to the Far East.

On 22 October 1956, she was transferred to Pacific Fleet.

On 26 March 1963, she was decommissioned from the navy, mothballed and put on hold in Sovetskaya Gavan.

On 18 March 1972, she was reactivated and put into operation.

On 18 September 1980 to February 3, 1986, she was overhauled at Dalzavod in Vladivostok.

On 12 October 1986, she was disarmed and decommissioned from the navy.

On 11 February 1988, she was stricken by the navy.

In 1991, she was sold to a private Indian firm for scrap in India.

=== Pennant numbers ===
| Date | Pennant number |
|---|---|
| | 10 |
| 1954 | 25 |
| 1956 | 47 |
| 1972 | 832 |
| 1977 | 835 |
| | 472 |
| 1983 | 039 |
| 1986 | 024 |

== See also ==
- Cruiser
- Sverdlov-class cruiser
- List of ships of the Soviet Navy
- List of ships of Russia by project number
