= Mikhail Lazarev =

Russian fleet commander and explorer (1788–1851)

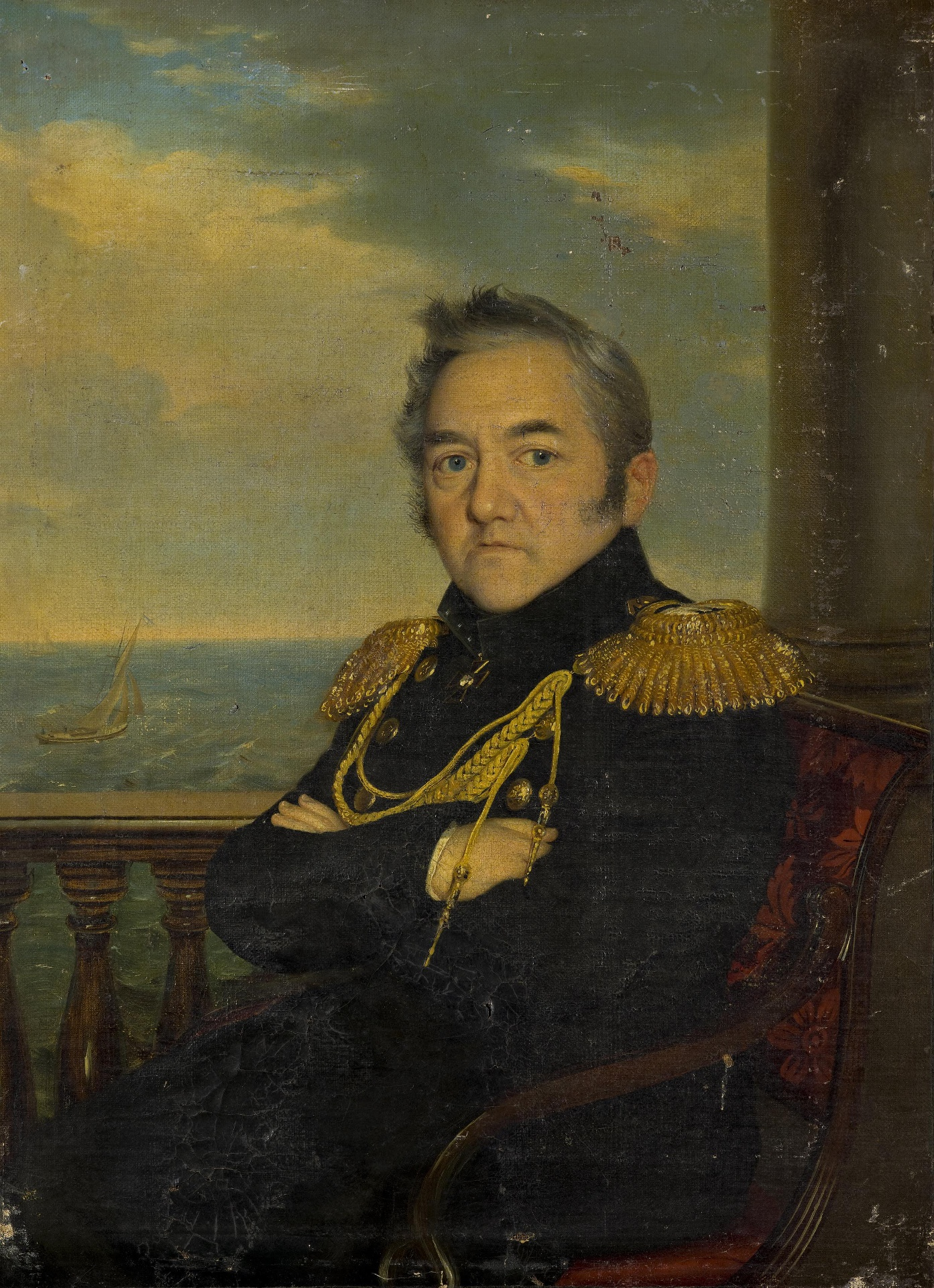
- Portrait by Robert Schwede, 1844
- Born: 14 November 1788; Vladimir, Russian Empire
- Died: 23 April 1851 (aged 62); Vienna, Austrian Empire
- Military career
- Allegiance: Russia
- Branch: Imperial Russian Navy
- Rank: Rear admiral
- Conflicts: Russo-Swedish War (1808–1809); Napoleonic Wars; Patriotic War of 1812; Greek War of Independence; Battle of Navarino

Admiral Mikhail Petrovich Lazarev (Russian: Михаил Петрович Лазарев; 14 November [O.S. 3 November] 1788 – 23 April [O.S. 11 April] 1851) was a Russian fleet commander and explorer.

== Education and early career ==
Lazarev was born in the city of Vladimir, a scion of the old Russian nobility from the Vladimir region. In 1800, he enrolled in Russia's Naval Cadet Corps. Three years later, he was sent to the British Royal Navy, where he would stay for a continuous five-year navigation. From 1808 to 1813, Lazarev served in Russia's Baltic Fleet. He took part in the Russo-Swedish War of 1808–1809 and Patriotic War of 1812.

== Career as an explorer ==
Lazarev first circumnavigated the globe in 1813–1816, aboard the vessel Suvorov; the expedition began at Kronstadt and reached Alaska. During this voyage, Lazarev discovered the Suvorov Atoll.

As a commander of the ship Mirny and Fabian Gottlieb von Bellingshausen's deputy on his world cruise in 1819–1821 (Bellingshausen commanded Vostok), Lazarev took part in the discovery of Antarctica and numerous islands. On 28 January 1820, the expedition discovered the Antarctic mainland, approaching the Antarctic coast at the coordinates 69°21′28″S 2°14′50″W and seeing ice-fields there.

In 1822–1825, Lazarev circumnavigated the globe for the third time on his frigate Kreyser, conducting broad research in the fields of meteorology and ethnography.

== Wartime commands ==
In 1826, Lazarev became commander of the ship Azov, which would sail to the Mediterranean Sea as the flagship of the First Mediterranean Squadron under command of Admiral Login Petrovich Geiden and participated in the Battle of Navarino in 1827. Lazarev received the rank of rear admiral for his excellence during the battle.

In 1828–1829, he was in charge of the Dardanelles blockade. In 1830, Lazarev returned to Kronstadt and became a commander of naval units of the Baltic Fleet. Two years later, he was made chief of staff of the Black Sea Fleet. In February–June 1833, Lazarev led a Russian squadron to the Bosporus and signed the Treaty of Hünkâr İskelesi with the Ottoman Empire. In 1833, Lazarev was appointed commander of the Black Sea Fleet, the Black Sea ports, and also military governor of Sevastopol and Nikolayev.

== Influence and legacy ==
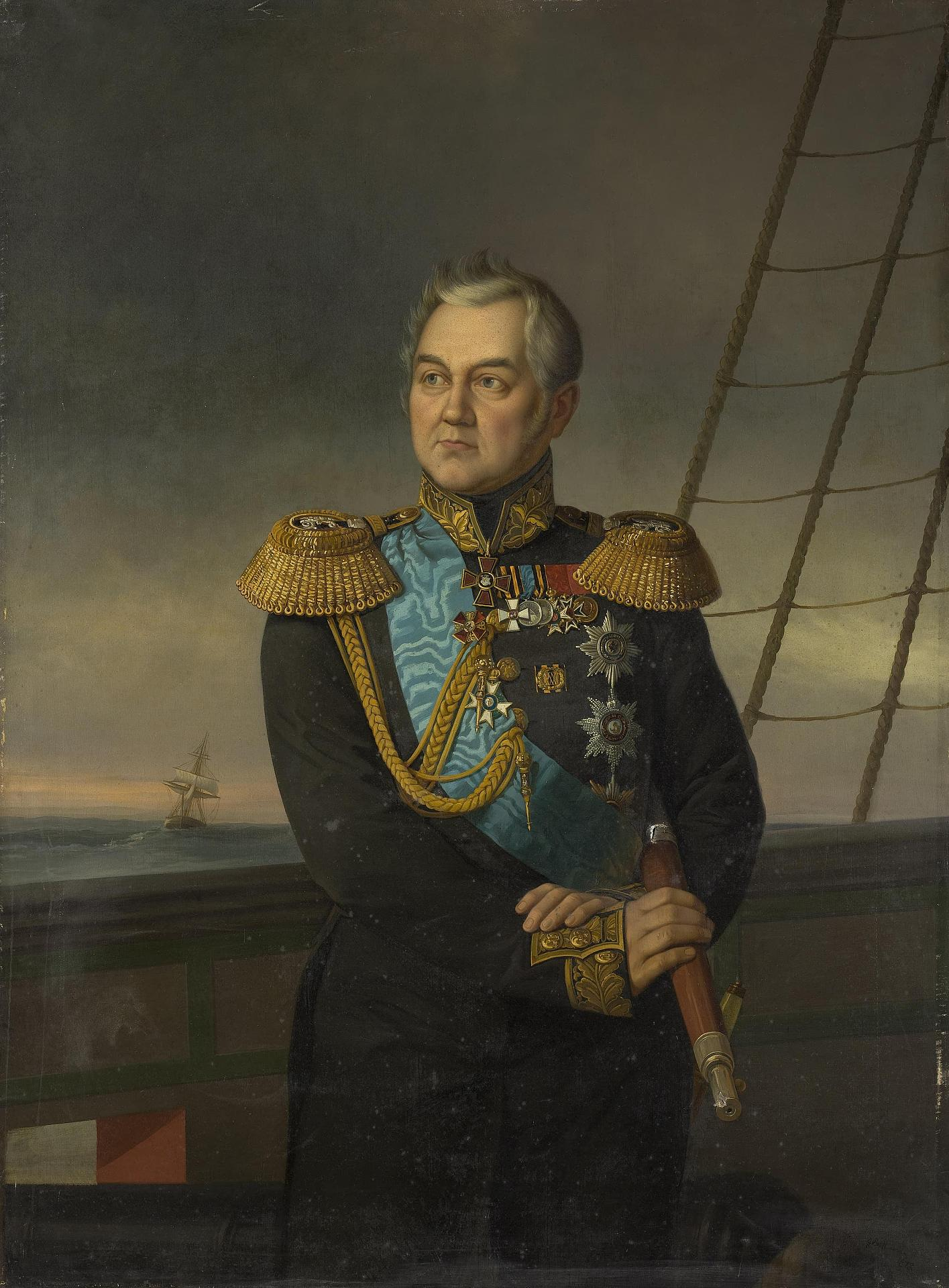
Portrait by Georg von Bothmann, 1873

Admiral Lazarev exercised great influence both in technical matters and as a mentor to younger officers. He advocated the building of a steam-powered fleet, but Russia's technical and economic backwardness hindered his plans. He tutored a number of Russian fleet commanders, including Pavel Nakhimov (1802–1855), Vladimir Alexeyevich Kornilov (1806–1854), Vladimir Istomin (1810–1855), and Grigory Butakov (1820–1882).

An atoll in the Pacific Ocean, capes in the Amur Liman and on the Unimak Island, a former island in the Aral Sea, a port in the Sea of Japan, bay and sea in the South Ocean, a settlement near Sochi and other locations bear Lazarev's name.

Russian and Soviet navies had ships named after the admiral:

- Admiral Lazarev, a monitor of the Imperial Russian Navy built in 1867 and lead ship of her class
- A light cruiser ordered for the Imperial Russian Navy in 1914, completed and renamed Krasnyi Kavkaz after the Russian Revolution of 1917
- Admiral Lazarev, a Sverdlov-class cruiser built in the early 1950s
- The Kirov-class battlecruiser Frunze, renamed Admiral Lazarev after the 1991 dissolution of the Soviet Union

Lazarev is buried with his disciples Nakhimov, Kornilov and Istomin in the Admirals' Burial Vault in Sevastopol. A minor planet 3660 Lazarev, discovered by Soviet astronomer Nikolai Stepanovich Chernykh in 1978, is named after him.

== Honours and awards ==
- Order of St. George, IV class
- Order of St. Vladimir, 1st class
- Order of St. Alexander Nevsky
- Order of White Eagle
- Companion of the Order of the Bath (United Kingdom)
- Military Order of St. Louis (France)

== Sources ==
- "Лазарев, Михаил Петрович" . Brockhaus and Efron Encyclopedic Dictionary (in Russian). 1906.
- Yastremsky, A. M. (2023). "ЛАЗАРЕВ МИХАИЛ ПЕТРОВИЧ". Great Russian Encyclopedia. Electronic version.
