= Anchorage (maritime) =

Designated location at sea for ships to drop anchor

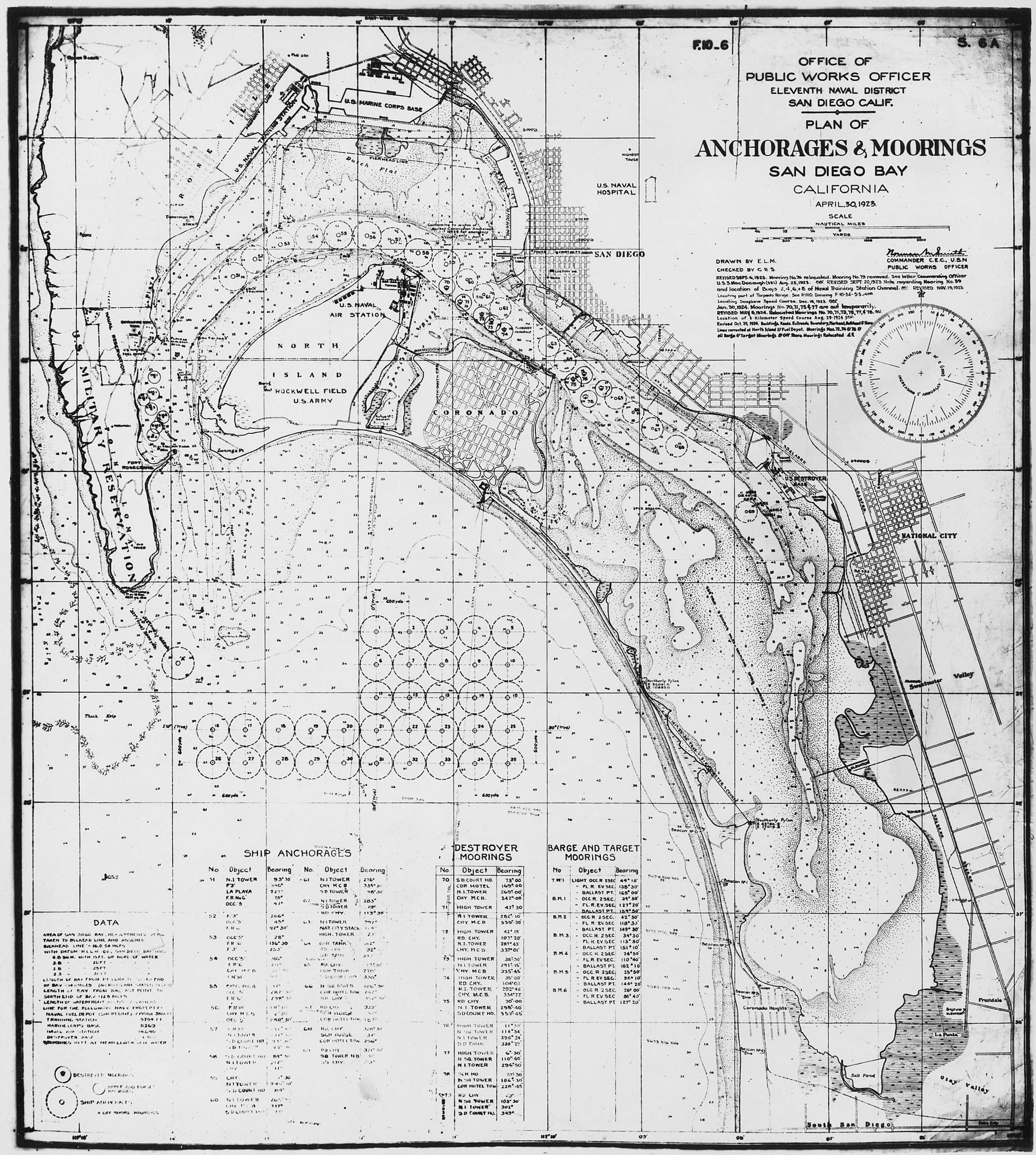
Plan of San Diego Bay in the 1940s, making distinctions between anchorages and moorings

An anchorage is a location at sea where ships can lower anchors.

Anchorages are where anchors are lowered and utilised, whereas moorings usually are tethering to buoys or something similar. The locations usually have conditions for safe anchorage in protection from weather conditions, and other hazards.

The purpose of resting a ship at sea securely can be for waiting to enter ports, as well as taking on cargo or passengers where insufficient port facilities exist.

Some coastlines without port facilities have extensive anchorage locations.

In the days of large-scale sailing ship operations, a ship could wait at an anchorage for the wind to change, allowing it to continue its journey.

The mooring of large ships in locations with adequate conditions for secure berthing is an engineering task requiring considerable technical skill.

== See also ==
- Roadstead
- Sea anchor
