= Obukhov State Plant =

Historical russian machine-building plant in St. Petersburg, Russia

Coordinates: 59.862165°N 30.477211°E

- Type: Joint-stock company
- Industry: Defense industry Metallurgy
- Founded: 1863
- Founder: Pavel Obukhov
- Headquarters: Saint Petersburg, Russia
- Parent: Almaz-Antey
- Website: goz.ru

Obukhov State Plant (also known Obukhovski Plant, Russian: Государственный Обуховский Завод, romanized: Gosudarstvennyy Obukhovskiy Zavod) is a major Russian metallurgy and heavy machine-building plant in St. Petersburg, Russia.

== Predecessors ==
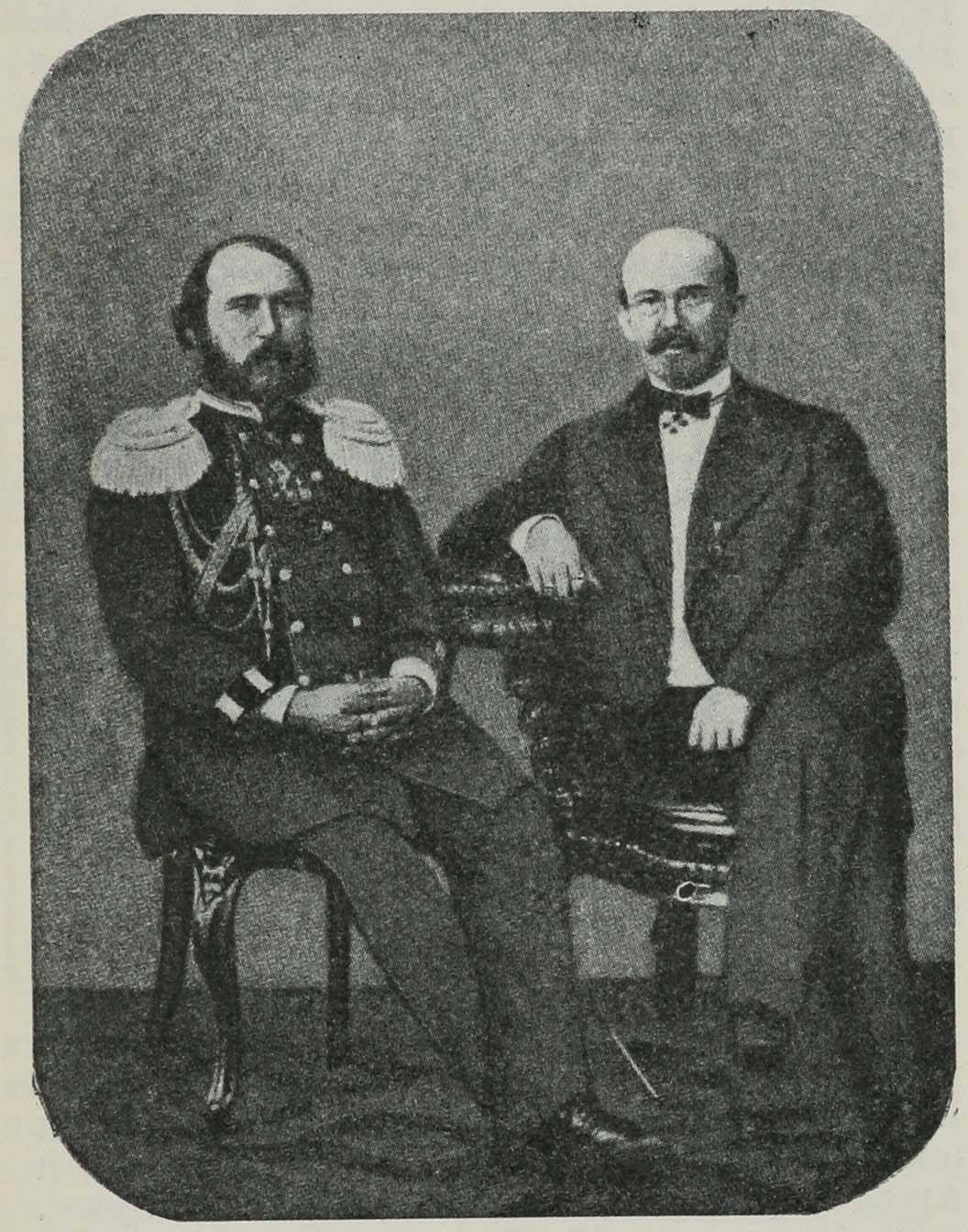
Obukhov and Putilov

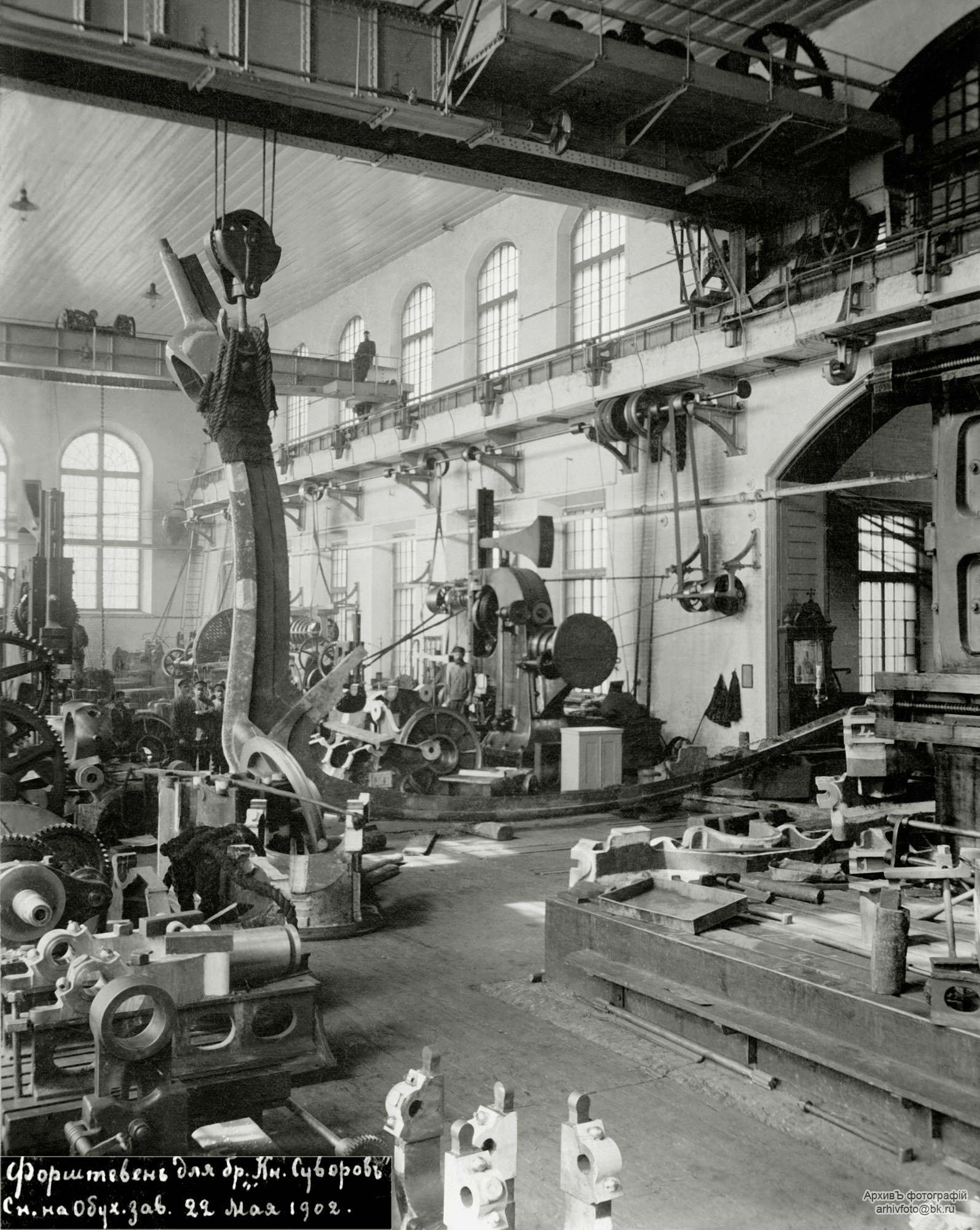
Obukhov State Plant in 1902

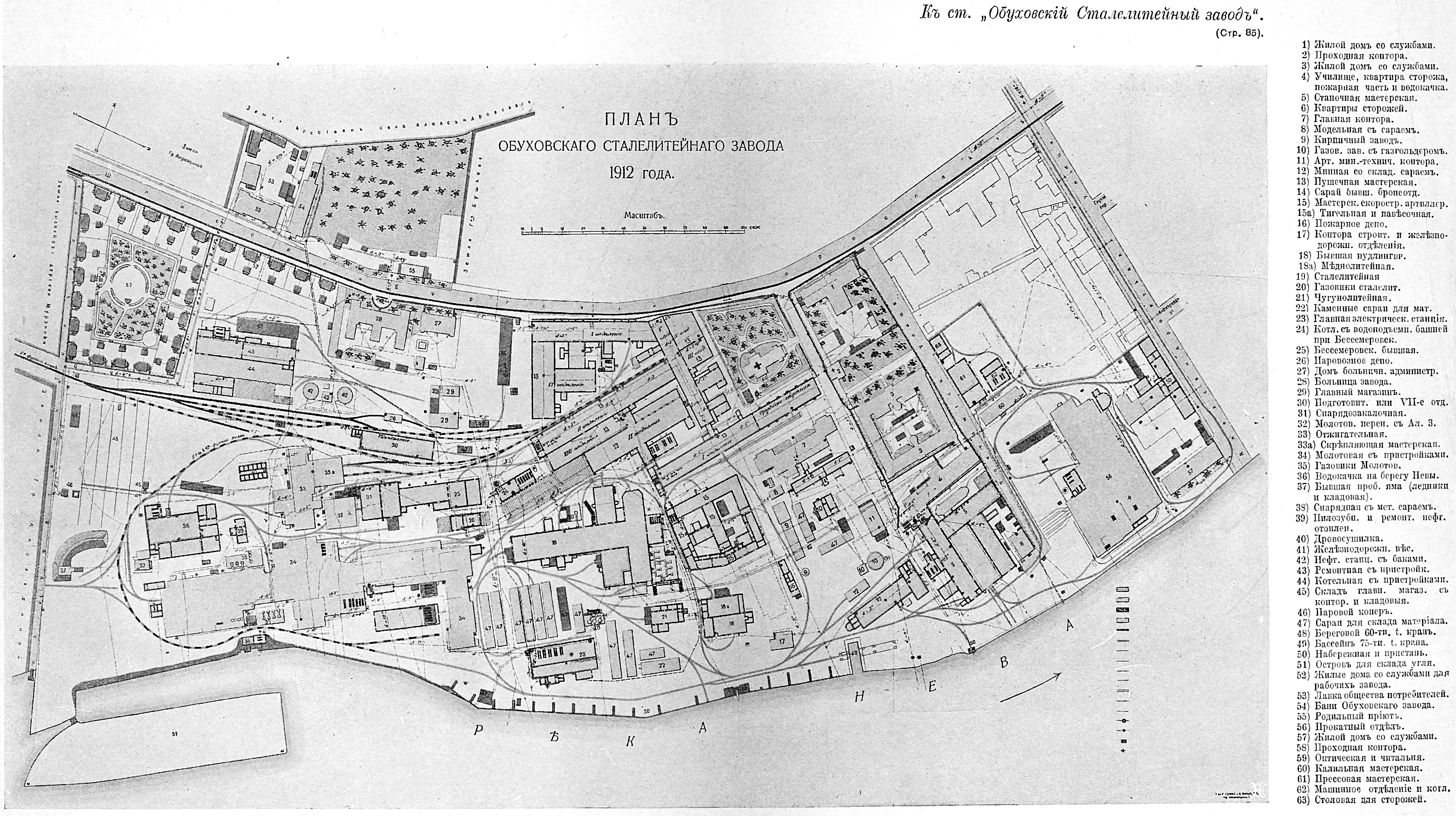
Floor plan of the factory in 1912

In 1854, the mining engineer P.M. Obukhov invented a new procedure to make crucible steel. In combination with the work of metallurgist P.P. Anosov, this crucible steel proved very useful for making cannons. In 1859, this led to the founding of the Prince Michael Artillery Works in Zlatoust. In 1860, this factory delivered its first steel cannon. A reason for the failure of this company was the problematic transport of the guns from this factory to the end users. In 1863, the state would therefore sponsor the establishment of two new artillery factories: The Motovilikhinsk works on the navigable Kama River near Perm; and the Obukhov-Putilov-Kudryavzev factory in St. Petersburg, later known as Obukhov.

== History in Tsarist Russia (1863-1917) ==
=== Foundation ===
Colonel Putilov acquired a license to use Obukhov's procedure to make crucible steel in 1861. In 1863, Putilov acquired a piece of land on the Neva that belonged to the state and founded the Obukhov Steel Works. In this, Putilov was supported by the Russian navy.

=== Modelled on Krupp ===
In the 1860s, Russia ordered a massive amount of Krupp guns for its field, naval and coastal artillery. These were all rifled, but the first orders were for muzzle loaders, while later orders were breechloaders. Another technical innovation meant a change from massive gun barrels cast in one piece to built-up gun barrels.

The idea behind the state support for the foundation of the Obukhov factory was that Russia did not want to be dependent on other nations for its artillery. Later on, it was obvious that Obukhov would make copies of the Krupp designs. But in fact, Russian orders were what led to these designs in the first place, as these orders were crucial for Krupp to expand its gun manufacturing business.

=== Early years ===
The Obukhov works were a joint stock company led by Mr. Obukhov and aimed to produce artillery based on the Krupp examples. The factory started production in 1864. The early years of the company were very difficult. The financial base of the company was too small. What saved the company in the early years were massive advances on orders which were to be delivered. By 1864, it had received advances of 1,300,000 rubles without having delivered a single gun.

In 1864, the Russian Navy Ministry then intervened, and appointed a colonel as general manager of the Obukhov Works. Engineer Obukhov remained responsible only for making crucible steel. The shareholders accepted an agreement that limited their rights. Now about 1,200,000 rubles were spent on new machinery; and staff, that had gained experience through Krupp, was hired.

The interference of the navy was successful in the sense that in 1866, satisfactory models of 4-, 8-, 12- and 24-pdr guns were made, all muzzle loaders. While the Russian navy had succeeded in becoming independent for its artillery, the early Russian system for naval rifled breechloading guns remained very similar to the Prussian and early German system.

=== Later years ===
In 1885, the Ministry of the Navy forced out the remaining private shareholders. During the whole Tsarist period, the company remained a major producer of artillery and other military equipment.

== History during the Soviet Union (1917-1991) ==
On 20 June 1918, V. Volodarsky was assassinated while making his way to a meeting relating to industrial unrest in the factory. From 1922 to 1992, it was renamed Bolshevik Plant no. 232.

In the late 1920s, it became one of the two main Soviet tank factories (along with the Kharkov Locomotive Factory), and produced the first domestic tank, the T-18. It later became home to the AVO-5 tank design bureau, soon named OKMO, which was responsible for the T-26 infantry tank. In 1932, the tank department of the Bolshevik factory, became the new Factory No. 174 (K.E. Voroshilov). This new, independent enterprise was dedicated to the production of T-26.

Janusz Magnuski says that in 1935, one of the former departments of the Bolshevik factory became a base for the new independent "Factory No. 185 (S.M. Kirov)". The OKMO, for a few months a part of Factory No. 174, moved at the same time to Factory No. 185. The new enterprise was also dedicated to the production of tanks, and because of its honorific is often confused with Kirov Factory. The main part of Bolshevik Factory remained focused on production of heavy artillery. On the other hand, Zaloga says that in 1935, after the assassination of Sergey Kirov, the whole Bolshevik Factory No. 232 was renamed "Factory No. 185 (S.M. Kirov)", yet Leningrad inhabitants continued to refer to it as the Bolshevik Factory.

== History in Russia (1991-) ==
The Leningrad factory's historical name was restored in 1992 by the formation of a unitary enterprise, FSUE Obukhov State Plant.

In the mid-1990s, Obukhov was a state-controlled company specialized in metallurgy and heavy machine building. Its military products included missile launching equipment, ICBM missile silos, ground equipment associated with missile systems, submarine missile launch tubes, naval guns, and submarine antenna arrays. As regards civilian products, it made castings for the electrotechnical, chemical, and shipbuilding industries. Other civilian products were fork-lift trucks, wheelchairs, smoothing irons and other home appliances, television sets, cameras, and gas and oil extraction equipment.

In 2002, Obukhov became part of the Almaz-Antey military industrial concern, and in 2003, it became a joint-stock company, OJSC GOZ Obukhov Plant.

== Products ==
=== Some guns made for Tsarist Russia ===
Cal	name	velocity	Comments	Used
30.5 cm	M07 L/52	815 m/s		Gangut class, Imp. Mariya class battleships
30.5 cm	M95 L/40			Last on Andrei Pervozvanny class battleships
30.5 cm	M77 L/40	792 m/s		First on Sissoi Veliky
30.5 cm	M77 L/35	637 m/s	Like Krupp C/77 L/35	Chesma, Navarin, Georgii Pobedonosets
30.5 cm	M77 L/30	569 m/s		Imperator Aleksandr II-class, Dvenadsat Apostolov, Ekaterina II, Sinop
30.5 cm	M67 L/20	447 m/s		Petr Veliky
27.9 cm	M77 L/22	454 m/s		Admiral Lazarev-class monitors
27.9. cm	M67 L/20	403 m/s		
25.4 cm	C/91 L/45	692 m/s		Admiral Ushakov-class, Peresvet-class, Rostislav

== See also ==
- First Russian Society of Communist Agricultural Workers, founded by workers from the Obukhov factory
