= Fore-and-aft rig =

Sailing rig consisting mainly of sails

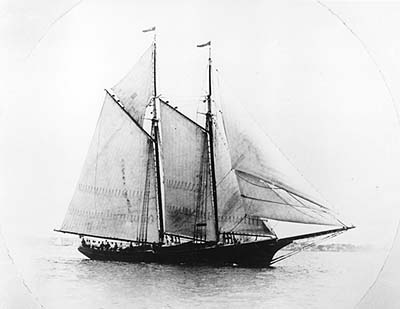
The gaff-rigged schooner Effie M. Morrissey

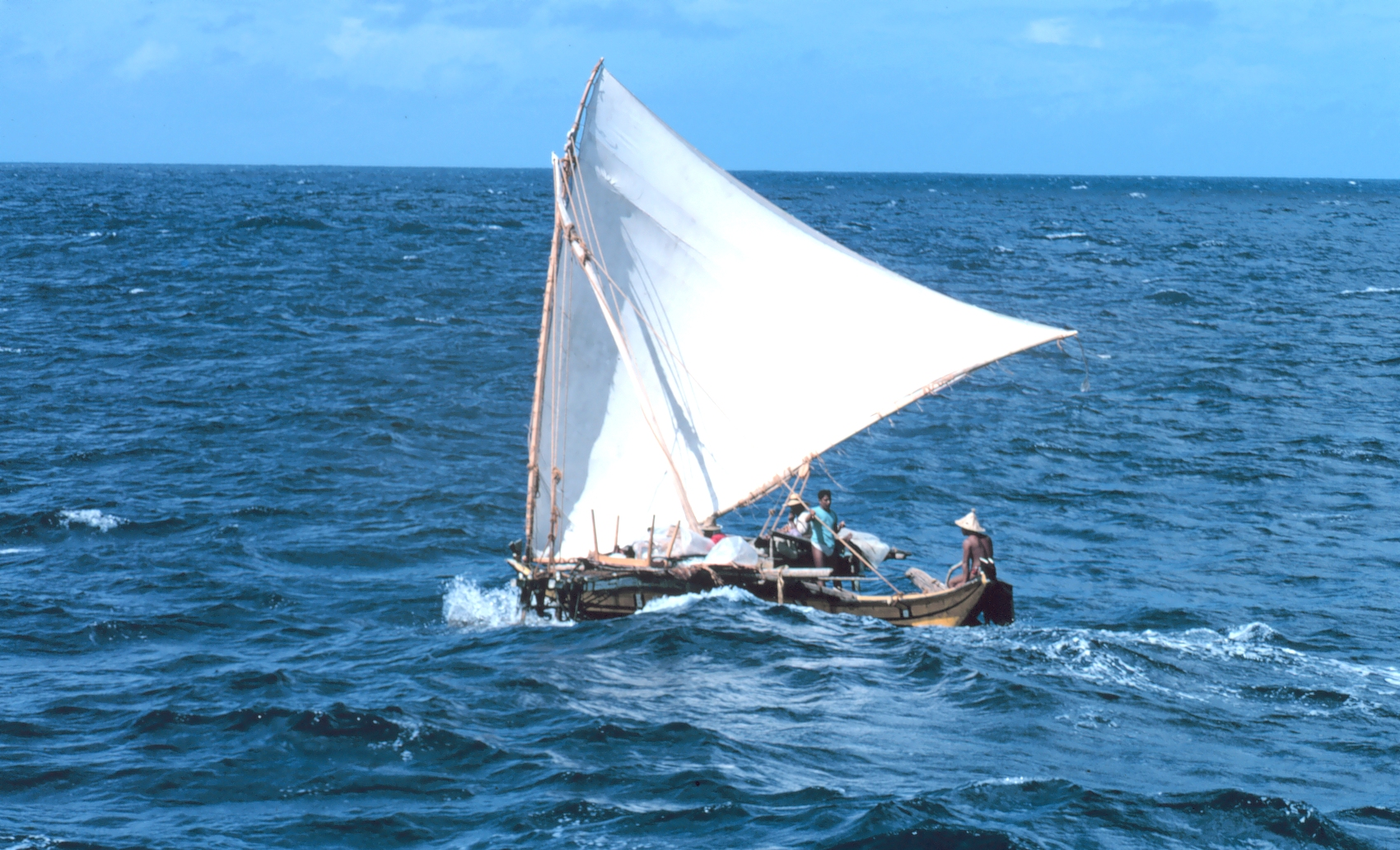
Micronesian wa with crab claw sail

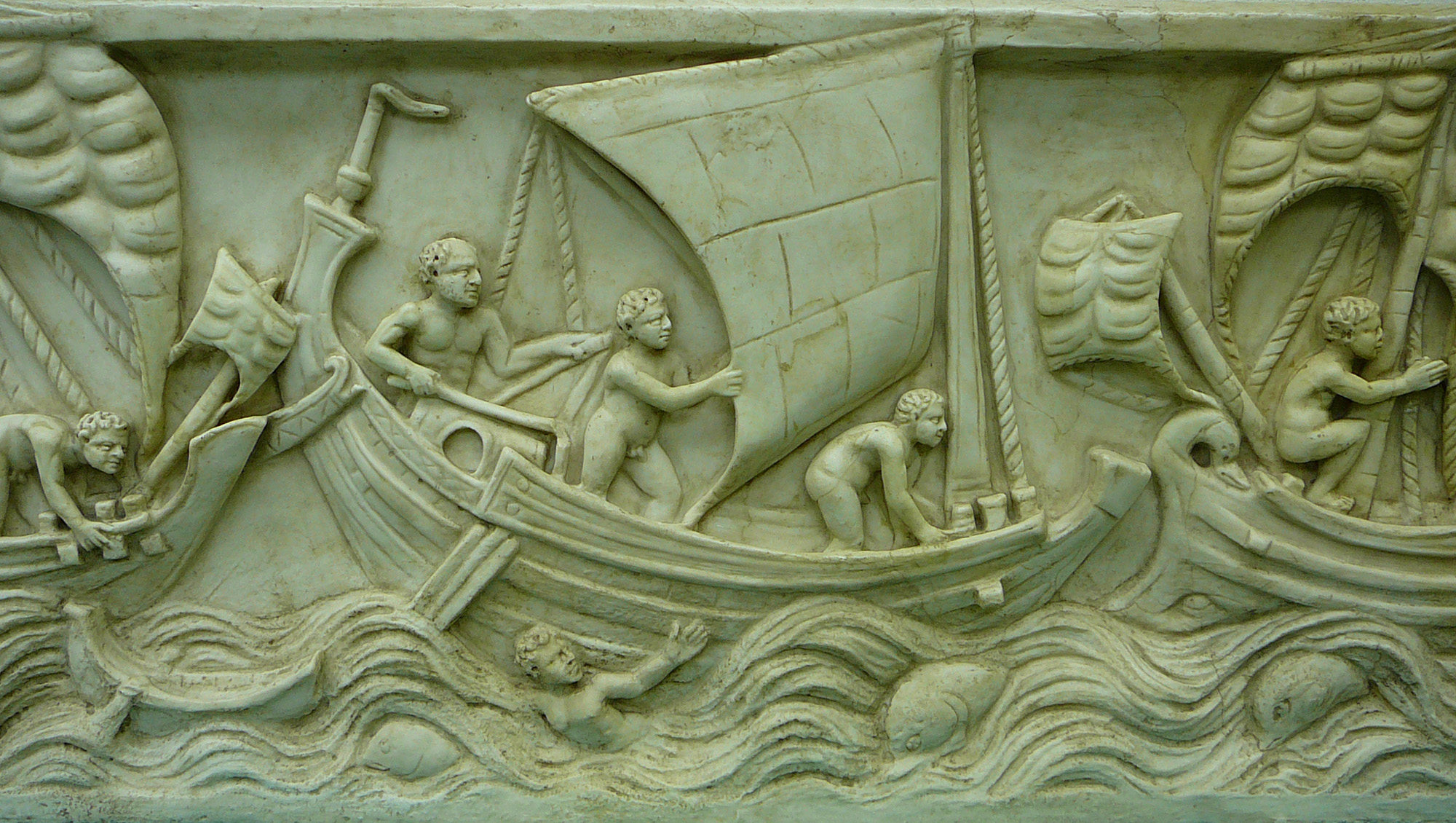
The earliest European fore-and-aft rigs appeared in the form of spritsails in Greco-Roman navigation, as this carving of a 3rd century AD Roman merchant ship

A fore-and-aft rig is a sailing ship rig with sails set mainly in the median plane of the keel, rather than perpendicular to it, as on a square-rigged vessel.

== Description ==
Fore-and-aft rigged sails include staysails, Bermuda rigged sails, gaff rigged sails, gunter rig, lateen sails, lug sails, tanja sails, the spanker sail on a square rig, and crab claw sails.

Fore-and-aft rigs include:

- Rigs with one mast: the proa, the catboat, the sloop, the cutter
- Rigs with two masts: the ketch, the yawl
- Rigs with two or more masts: the schooner

Barques and barquentines are partially square rigged and partially fore-and-aft rigged.

A rig which combines both on a foremast is known as a hermaphroditic rig.

== History ==
=== Austronesia ===
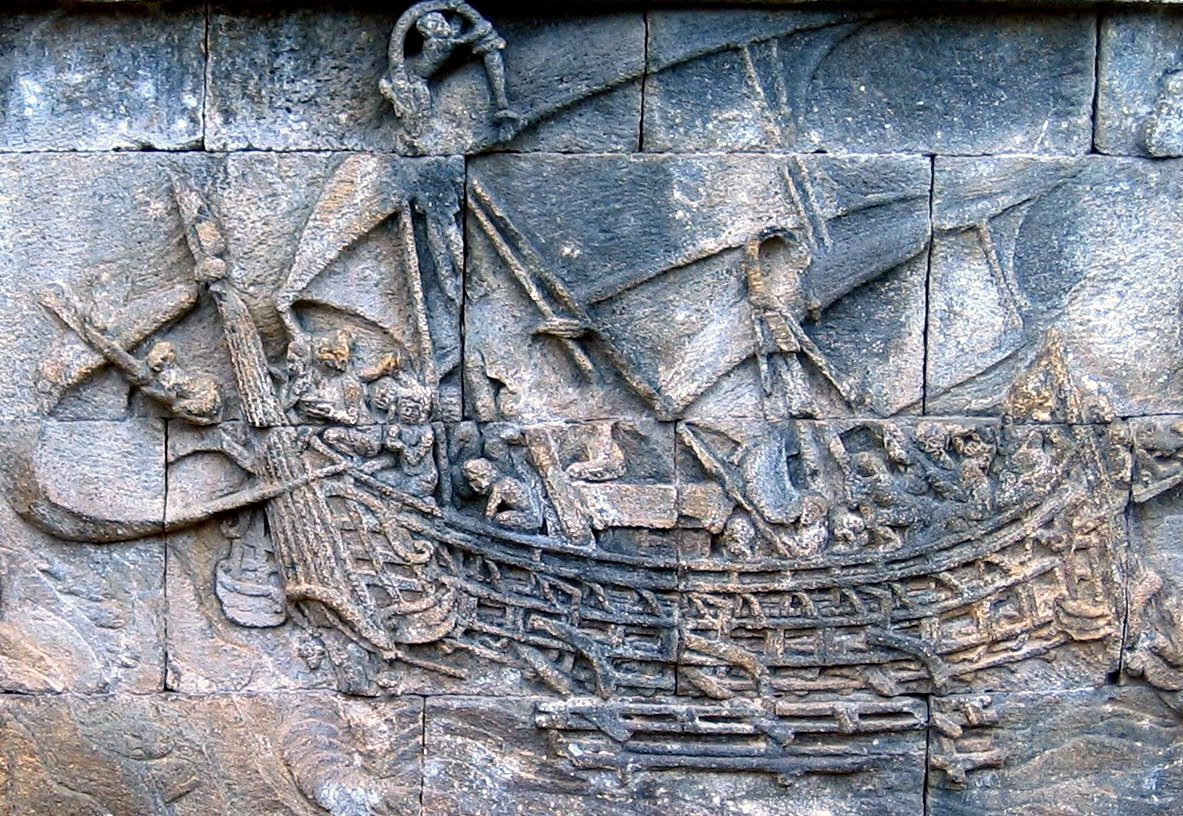
One of the ships in Borobudur depicting a double-outrigger vessel with fore-and-aft tanja sails on tripod masts (c. 8th century AD)

The fore-and-aft rig is believed to have been developed independently by the Austronesian peoples some time after 1500 BC with the invention of the crab claw sail. It is suggested that it evolved from a more primitive V-shaped "square" sail with two spars that come together at the hull. Crab claw sails spread from Maritime Southeast Asia to Micronesia, Island Melanesia, Polynesia, and Madagascar via the Austronesian migrations. Austronesians in Southeast Asia also later developed other types of fore-and-aft sails, such as the tanja sail (also known as the canted square sail, canted rectangular sail, or the balance lug sail).

Their use later spread into the Indian Ocean since the first millennium, among vessels from the Middle East, South Asia, and China.

=== Europe ===
The lateen was developed in the Mediterranean as early as the 2nd century AD, during Roman times. It became common by the 5th century.

The square rig had predominated in Europe since the dawn of sea travel, but in the generally gentle climate of southern Europe and the Mediterranean Sea during the last few centuries before the Renaissance the fore-and-aft began to replace it. By 1475, its use increased, and within a hundred years the fore-and-aft rig was in common use on rivers and in estuaries in Britain, northern France, and the Low Countries, though the square rig remained standard for the harsher conditions of the open North Sea as well as for trans-Atlantic sailing.

== See also ==
- Square rig
