= French ironclad Magenta =

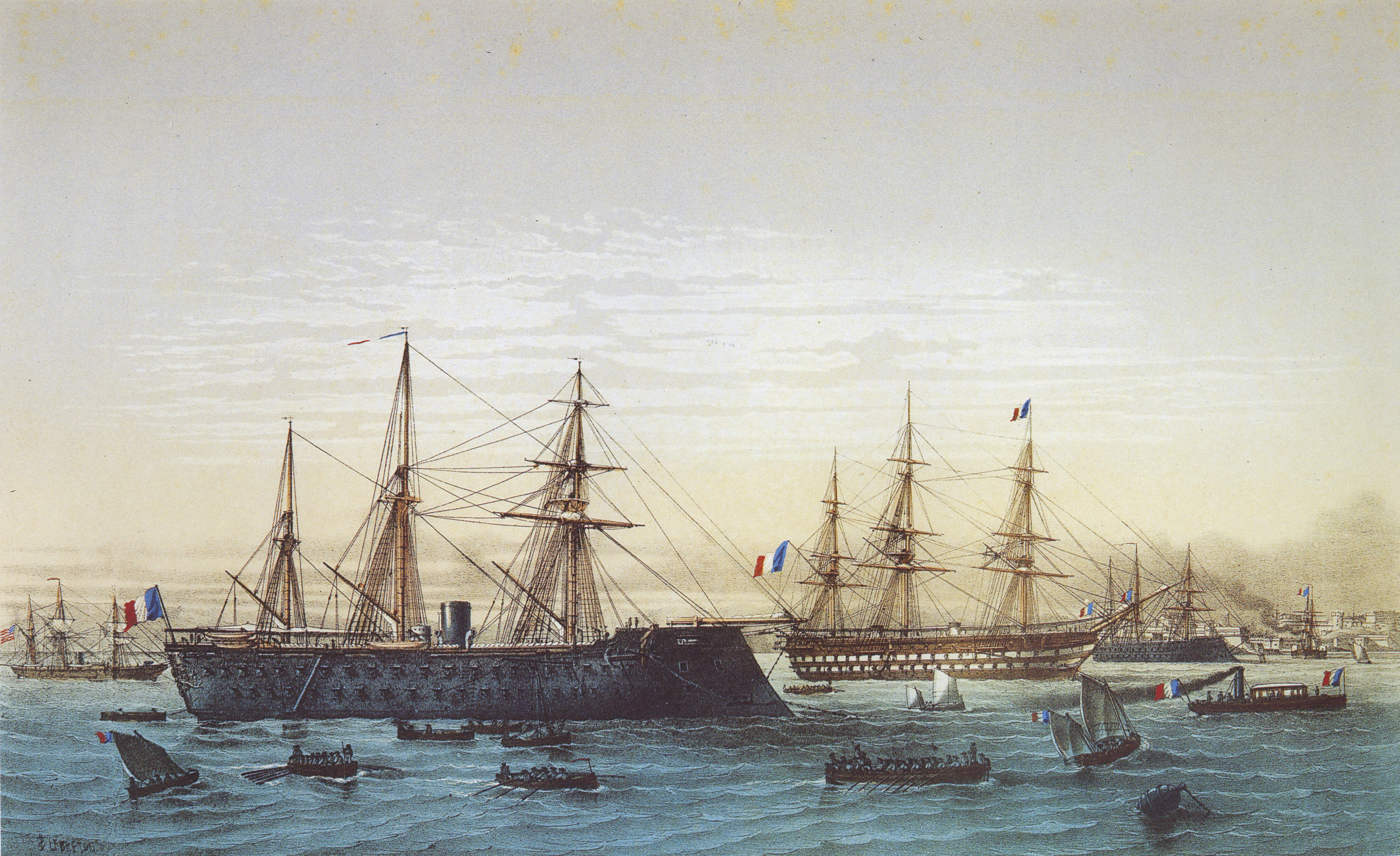
- Magenta, Napoléon and Solférino anchored in the harbor at Brest, France.

History

France
- Name: Magenta
- Namesake: Battle of Magenta
- Builder: Brest
- Laid down: 22 June 1859
- Launched: 22 June 1861
- Fate: Exploded and sank, 31 October 1875

General characteristics (as built)
- Class & type: Magenta-class ironclad
- Displacement: 6,965 t (6,855 long tons)
- Length: 88.6 m (290 ft 8 in)
- Beam: 17.34 m (56 ft 11 in)
- Draft: 8.44 m (27 ft 8 in)
- Installed power: 8 boilers; 4,019 PS (2,956 kW) (trials)
- Propulsion: 1 shaft, 1 horizontal-return connecting rod-steam engine
- Sail plan: Barquentine-rig
- Speed: 12.88 knots (23.85 km/h; 14.82 mph) (trials)
- Range: 1,840 nautical miles (3,410 km; 2,120 mi) at 10 knots (19 km/h; 12 mph)
- Complement: 674
- Armament: 16 × single 194 mm (7.6 in) smoothbore muzzle-loading guns; 34 × single 164.7 mm (6.5 in) rifled muzzle-loading (RML) guns; 2 × 225 mm (8.9 in) RML howitzers
- Armor: Belt: 120 mm (4.7 in); Battery: 109–120 mm (4.3–4.7 in)

Magenta was the lead ship of her class of two broadside ironclads built for the French Navy (Marine nationale) in the early 1860s. She served as flagship of the Mediterranean Squadron.

== Design and description ==
The Magenta class were two-decked ironclad ships of the line, much as the preceding Gloire-class ironclad were armored versions of traditional frigates. Magenta was 88.6 m (290 ft 8 in) long, had a beam of 17.34 meters (56 ft 11 in), and a draft of 8.44 meters (27 ft 8 in). The ship displaced 6,965 t (6,855 long tons). The Magentas were equipped with a metal-reinforced, spur-shaped ram, the first ironclads to be fitted with a ram, and they had a crew of 674 officers and enlisted men.

The Magenta-class ships had a single two-cylinder horizontal-return connecting-rod compound steam engine that drove the propeller shaft, using steam provided by eight boilers. The engine was rated at 1,000 nominal horsepower or 3,450 metric horsepower (2,540 kW) and was intended to give the ships a speed in excess of 13 knots (24 km/h; 15 mph). During their sea trials, sister ship Solférino achieved a speed of 12.88 knots (23.85 km/h; 14.82 mph) from 4,012 metric horsepower (2,951 kW). The Magenta class carried enough coal to allow them to steam for 1,840 nautical miles (3,410 km; 2,120 mi) at a speed of 10 knots (19 km/h; 12 mph). They were originally fitted with a three-masted barquentine rig that had a sail area of 1,711 square meters (18,420 sq ft), but they were re-rigged as barques with 1,960 m^{2} (21,100 sq ft) in 1864–1865.

=== Armament and protection ===
The main battery of the Magenta class consisted of sixteen 194-millimeter (7.6 in) Modèle 1858–60 smoothbore muzzle-loading guns, thirty-four 164.7-millimeter (6.5 in) Modèle 1858–60 rifled muzzle-loading (RML) guns and a pair of 225-millimeter (8.9 in) RML howitzers on two gun decks. All of the 194 mm guns and ten of the 164.7 mm guns were mounted on the lower gun deck on the broadside. The remaining 164.7 mm guns and the 225 mm howitzers were positioned on the upper gun deck; the former on the broadside, but the latter were placed on pivot mounts as chase guns fore and aft. In the late 1860s all of the guns on the lower gun deck were removed and their armament was changed to four 240-millimeter (9.4 in) RMLs and eight 194 mm smoothbores, two each of the latter fore and aft as chase guns on the upper gun deck. Their final armament consisted of ten Canon de 24 C modèle 1864 and four 194 mm guns as chase guns fore and aft.

The Magentas had a full-length waterline belt that consisted of wrought-iron plates 120 mm (4.7 in) thick. Above the belt both gun decks were protected with 109 mm (4.3 in) of armor, but the ends of the ships were unprotected.

== Construction and career ==
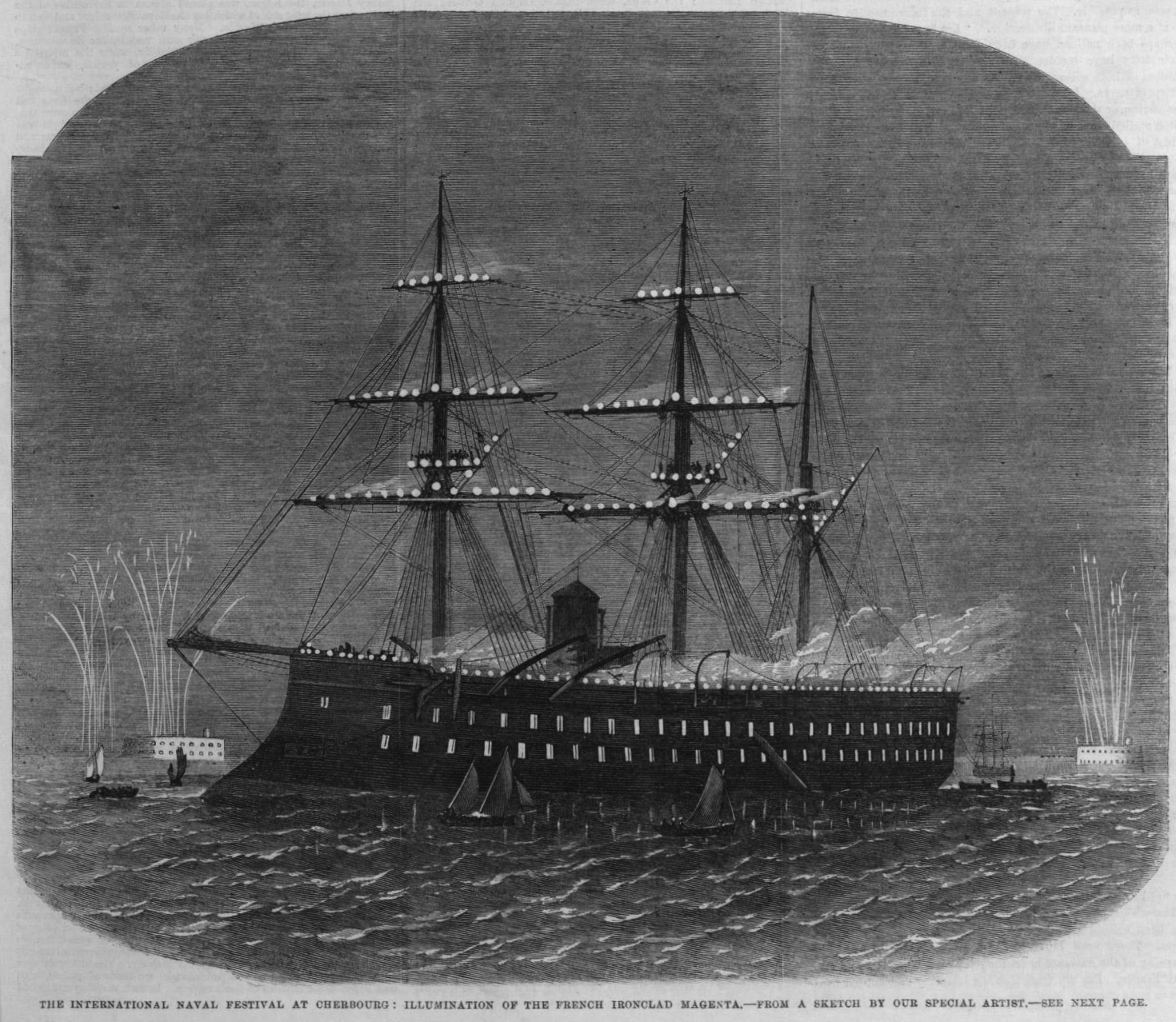
The International Naval Festival at Cherbourg, illumination of the French ironclad Magenta, 15 August 1865

On 21 July 1875, Magenta was serving as flagship in a naval exercise involving six ironclads – Magenta and five Alma-class central battery ironclads – and a number of smaller ships in the Tyrrhenian Sea off the east coast of Corsica . The ironclads were steaming in beautiful weather at 8 knots in two parallel columns, with Magenta leading one column, followed by Jeanne d′Arc and Reine Blanche, and Armide leading the other, followed by Thétis and Alma. At 12:00 noon the admiral commanding the squadron ordered the screw corvette Forfait, operating as a dispatch vessel, to pass astern of Magenta to receive orders. Attempting to place his ship in the column between Magenta and Jeanne d′Arc, the commanding officer of Forfait misjudged his turn, and Jeanne d′Arc collided with Forfait, her ram bow tearing into Forfait′s side. Forfait sank 14 minutes later, her crew of 160 taking safely to her boats; her commanding officer floated free from the bridge as Forfait sank beneath him, but also was rescued.

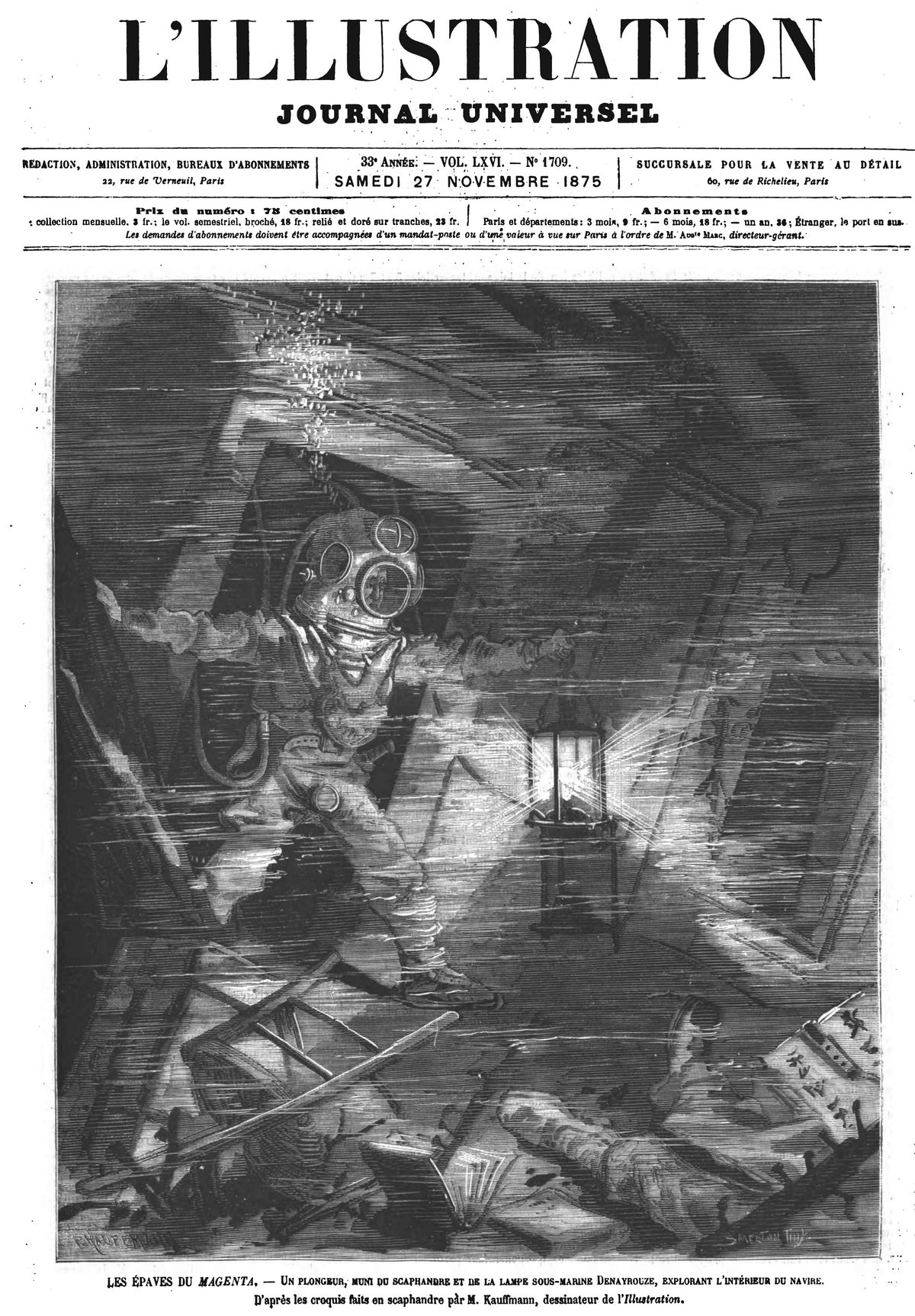
Salvage attempt in 1875

On 31 October 1875, an accidental nighttime galley fire started aboard Magenta while she was in port at the naval base at Toulon, France, and spread out of control. Her crew was able to flood her forward gunpowder magazine but could not reach her aft magazine. When it became clear that the ship could not be saved, her crew abandoned ship, and Magenta′s aft magazine exploded shortly afterward, 2 hours 55 minutes after the fire broke out. She sank in 15 meters (49 feet) of water. At the time of the accident, Magenta had a cargo of Carthaginian antiques, notably 2080 Carthaginian tombstones known as the Pricot de Sainte-Marie steles (Tophet, 2nd century BC) and a marble statue of Vibia Sabina (Thasos, c. 127-128 AD), found in 1874 by the Pricot de Sainte-Marie mission.

The wreck was located in April 1994. Fragments of stelae have since been recovered. The statue has been partially recovered, though the head was too damaged to be rejoined to the rest of the statue. The fragments are on display at the Louvre in Paris.
