= French ironclad Jeanne d'Arc =

French Navy's Alma-class ironclad

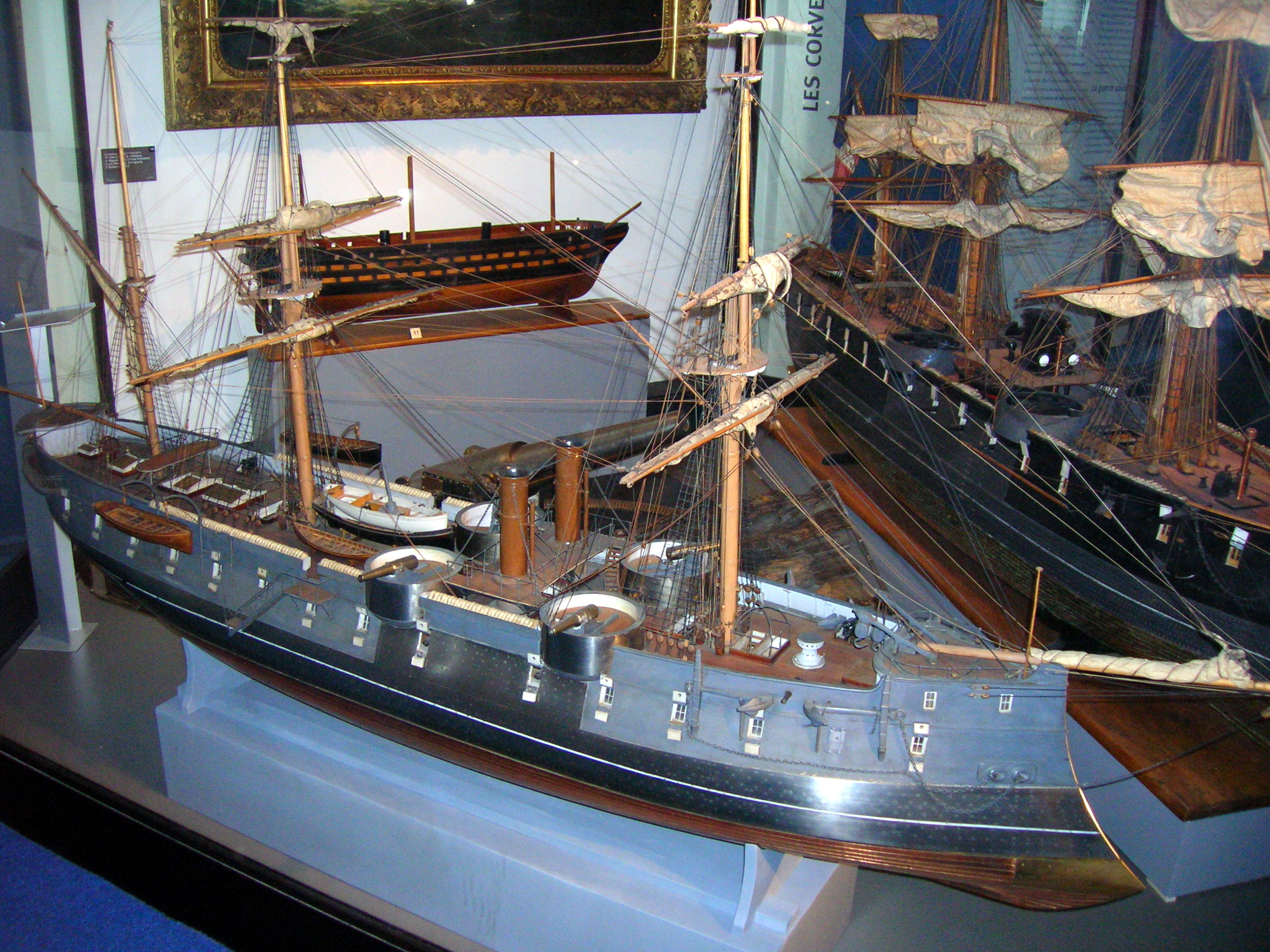
- Model of Jeanne d'Arc on display at the Musée de la Marine in Paris, before the rear barbettes were deleted

History

France
- Name: Jeanne d'Arc
- Namesake: Joan of Arc
- Builder: Cherbourg
- Laid down: 1865
- Launched: 28 September 1867
- Commissioned: 1869
- Decommissioned: 1 January 1876
- Recommissioned: 12 April 1879
- Fate: Condemned 28 August 1883

General characteristics
- Class & type: Alma-class ironclad
- Displacement: 3,675 t (3,617 long tons)
- Length: 68.9 m (226 ft 1 in)
- Beam: 14.08 m (46 ft 2 in)
- Draft: 6.37 m (20 ft 11 in) (mean)
- Installed power: 4 boilers; 1,884 ihp (1,405 kW)
- Propulsion: 1 shaft, 1 steam engine
- Sail plan: Barque-rig
- Speed: 11 knots (20 km/h; 13 mph)
- Range: 1,710 nautical miles (3,170 km; 1,970 mi) at 10 knots (19 km/h; 12 mph)
- Complement: 316
- Armament: 6 × single 194 mm (7.6 in) Mle 1864 guns; 4 × single 120 mm (4.7 in) guns
- Armor: Belt: 150 mm (5.9 in); Battery: 120 mm (4.7 in); Barbettes: 100 mm (3.9 in); Bulkheads: 120 mm (4.7 in)

Jeanne d'Arc ([ʒan daʁk]) was a wooden-hulled armored corvette built for the French Navy in the late 1860s. She was named for Joan of Arc, a Roman Catholic saint and heroine of the Hundred Years War. Jeanne d'Arc participated in the Franco-Prussian War of 1870–1871 and remained in commission afterwards, unlike many of her sisters. The ship was condemned in 1883, but nothing further is known as to her disposition.

== Design and description ==
The Alma-class ironclads (Note: Ironclad is the all-encompassing term for armored warships of this period. Armored corvettes were originally designed for the same role as traditional wooden corvettes, but this rapidly changed as the size and expense of these ships caused them to be used as second-class armored ships.) were designed as improved versions of the armored corvette Belliqueuse suitable for foreign deployments. Unlike their predecessor the Alma-class ships were true central battery ironclads as they were fitted with armored transverse bulkheads. Like most ironclads of their era they were equipped with a metal-reinforced ram.

Jeanne d'Arc measured 68.9 meters (226 ft 1 in) between perpendiculars, with a beam of 14.08 meters (46 ft 2 in). She had a mean draft of 6.37 meters (20 ft 11 in) and displaced 3,675 metric tons (3,617 long tons). Her crew numbered 316 officers and men.

=== Propulsion ===
The ship had a single horizontal return connecting-rod steam engine driving a single propeller. Her engine was powered by four oval boilers. On sea trials the engine produced 1,884 indicated horsepower (1,405 kW) and the ship reached 11.75 knots (21.76 km/h; 13.52 mph). Unlike all of her sisters except Thétis, she had two funnels, mounted side by side. Jeanne d'Arc carried 250 metric tons (250 long tons) of coal which allowed the ship to steam for 1,710 nautical miles (3,170 km; 1,970 mi) at a speed of 10 knots (19 km/h; 12 mph). She was barque-rigged and had a sail area of 1,454 square meters (15,650 sq ft).

=== Armament ===
Jeanne d'Arc mounted four of her 194-millimeter (7.6 in) Modèle 1864 breech-loading guns in the central battery on the battery deck. The other two 194-millimeter guns were mounted in barbettes on the upper deck, sponsoned out over the sides of the ship. The four 120-millimeter (4.7 in) guns were also mounted on the upper deck. She may have exchanged her Mle 1864 guns for Mle 1870 guns. The armor-piercing shell of the 20-caliber Mle 1870 gun weighed 165.3 pounds (75 kg) while the gun itself weighed 7.83 long tons (7.96 t). The gun fired its shell at a muzzle velocity of 1,739 ft/s (530 m/s) and was credited with the ability to penetrate a nominal 12.5 inches (320 mm) of wrought iron armour at the muzzle. The guns could fire both solid shot and explosive shells.

=== Armor ===
Jeanne d'Arc had a complete 150-millimeter (5.9 in) wrought iron waterline belt, approximately 2.4 meters (7.9 ft) high. The sides of the battery itself were armored with 120 millimeters (4.7 in) of wrought iron and the ends of the battery were closed by bulkheads of the same thickness. The barbette armor was 100 millimeters (3.9 in) thick, backed by 240 millimeters (9.4 in) of wood. The unarmored portions of her sides were protected by 15-millimeter (0.6 in) iron plates.

== Service ==
Jeanne d'Arc was laid down at Cherbourg in 1865 and launched on 28 September 1867. The ship began her sea trials on 9 March 1868 and was put into reserve at Brest in 1869. She was commissioned on 12 April 1870, shortly before the Franco-Prussian War began, and assigned to the Northern Squadron. On 24 July 1870 she departed Cherbourg in company with the rest of the Northern Squadron and they cruised off the Danish port of Frederikshavn between 28 July and 2 August until they entered the Baltic Sea. The squadron, now renamed the Baltic Squadron, remained in the Baltic, attempting to blockade Prussian ports on the Baltic until ordered to return to Cherbourg on 16 September. On 1 August 1873 Jeanne d'Arc was in Málaga, Spain and departed later that day bound for Cádiz.

On 21 July 1875, Jeanne d'Arc was participating in a naval exercise involving six ironclads – the broadside ironclad Magenta, operating as the flagship, and five Alma-class central battery ironclads including Jeanne d′Arc – and a number of smaller ships in the Tyrrhenian Sea off the east coast of Corsica . The ironclads were steaming in beautiful weather at 8 knots (15 km/h; 9.2 mph) in two parallel columns, with Magenta leading one column, followed by Jeanne d′Arc and Reine Blanche, and Armide leading the other, followed by Thétis and Alma, when at 12:00 noon the admiral commanding the squadron ordered the screw corvette Forfait, operating as a dispatch vessel, to pass astern of Magenta to receive orders. Attempting to place his ship in the column between Magenta and Jeanne d′Arc, the commanding officer of Forfait misjudged his turn, and Jeanne d′Arc collided with Forfait. The impact was barely noticeable aboard Jeanne d′Arc, but her ram bow tore into Forfait's side. Forfait sank 14 minutes later, her crew of 160 taking safely to her boats; her commanding officer floated free from the bridge as Forfait sank beneath him, but also was rescued.

On 3 December 1875, Jeanne d′Arc became the flagship of Rear Admiral Bonie, but she was placed in reserve on 1 January 1876 at Brest, France. Jeanne d'Arc was recommissioned on 12 April 1879 for service with the Levant Squadron. She was condemned on 28 August 1883 and nothing further is known of her fate.
