= French corvette Forfait =

History

France
- Name: Forfait
- Namesake: Pierre-Alexandre-Laurent Forfait (1752–1807), French engineer, hydrographer, politician, and Minister of the Navy (1799–1801)
- Launched: 1859
- Commissioned: 1860
- Fate: Sunk in collision 21 July 1875

General characteristics
- Type: Screw corvette
- Displacement: 1,126 tons
- Length: 222 ft (68 m)
- Propulsion: Steam engine, screw
- Sail plan: Barque rig
- Speed: 12 knots (22 km/h; 14 mph)
- Complement: 161
- Armament: As built 4 × 6-inch (152-mm) guns; Later 6 × 6-inch (152-mm) guns
- Armor: None

Forfait was an unarmored screw corvette built for the French Navy in the late 1850s that entered service in 1860. She saw service in the French intervention in Mexico in the 1860s and was sunk in a collision in 1875.

== Construction and commissioning ==
Forfait had a steam engine and screw propulsion that gave her a top speed under steam of 12 knots (22 km/h; 14 mph), as well as a barque rig. She initially was armed with four 152-mm (6-inch) guns, which by the 1870s had been increased to six 152-mm (6-inch) guns. She was unarmored. Launched in 1859, she entered service in 1860. Classified as a "wing scout," she was intended to conduct reconnaissance for the French fleet's larger ships, as well as to undertake independent operations.

== Service ==
=== 1860–1875 ===
An artist's impression of Forfait sinking in the Tyrrhenian Sea on 21 July 1875, drawn around the time of the sinking.

Early in her career, Forfait actively supported the French intervention in Mexico by transporting troops and equipment to Veracruz, Mexico, and landing a shore party to assist in the capture of Tuxpan, Mexico, in 1864. Later in the 1860s she operated in Southeast Asia and the Pacific Ocean and conducted hydrographic surveys off the northwest coast of Borneo. By 1872 she was based at Toulon, France, and operating with the French Navy's Mediterranean Squadron.

=== Loss ===
On 21 July 1875, Forfait was participating in a naval exercise involving six ironclads – the broadside ironclad Magenta, operating as the flagship, and five Alma-class central battery ironclads – and a number of smaller ships in the Tyrrhenian Sea off the east coast of Corsica . The ironclads were steaming in beautiful weather at 8 knots (15 km/h; 9.2 mph) in two parallel columns, with Magenta leading one column, followed by Jeanne d′Arc and Reine Blanche, and Armide leading the other, followed by Thétis and Alma. Operating as a dispatch vessel, Forfait was steaming outside of the columns. At 12:00 noon the admiral commanding the squadron ordered Forfait to pass astern of Magenta to receive orders. Attempting to place his ship in the column between Magenta and Jeanne d′Arc, the commanding officer of Forfait misjudged his turn, and Jeanne d′Arc collided with Forfait, her ram bow tearing into Forfait′s side. Forfait sank 14 minutes later, her crew of 160 taking safely to her boats. Her commanding officer, M. Vivielle, remained on the bridge until Forfait sank beneath him, but floated free, clung to floating wreckage, and was rescued. A court-martial acquitted him of blame in the sinking.
