= French ironclad Atalante =

French Alma-class ironclad

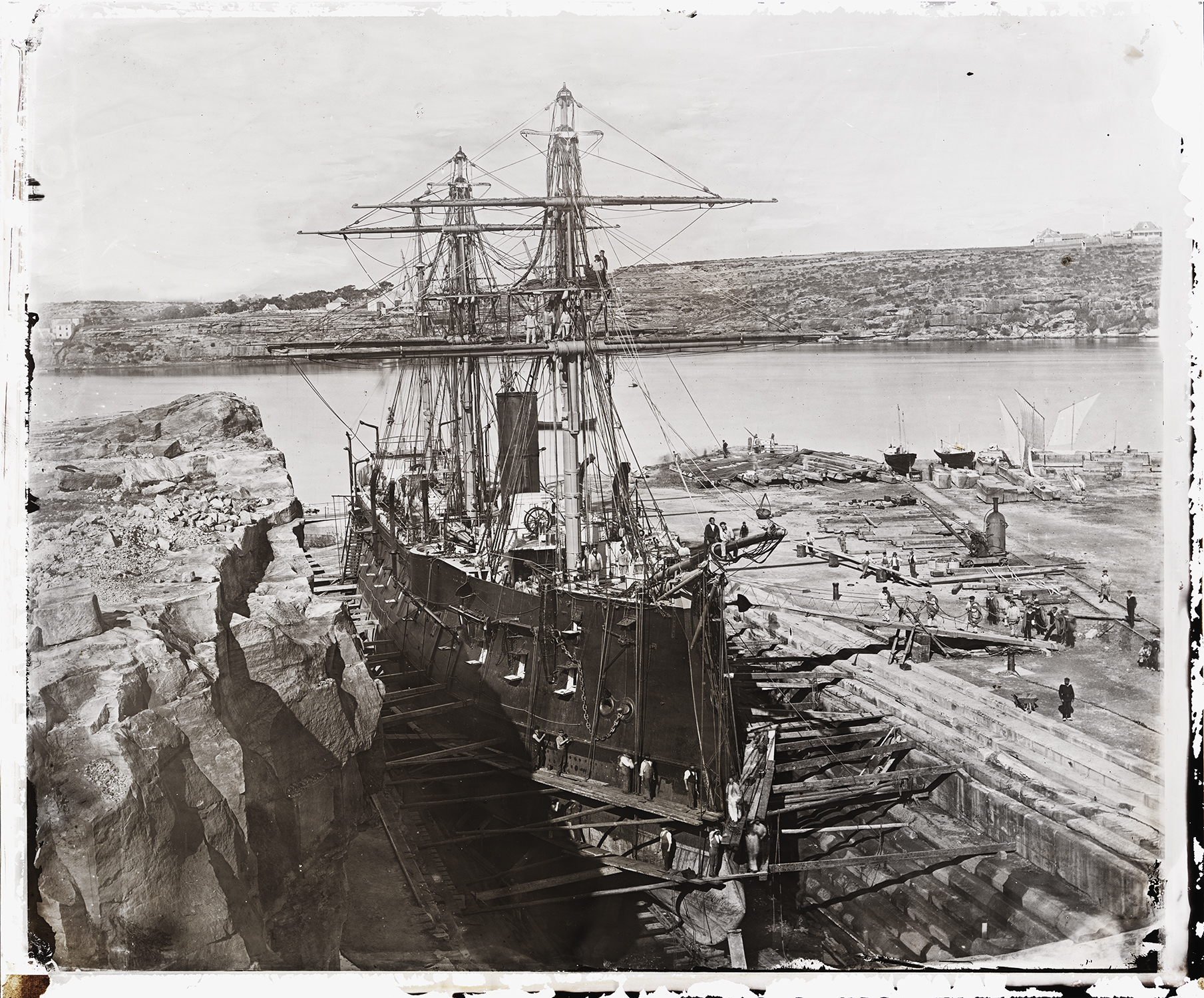
- Atalante in the Fitzroy Dock, Sydney Harbour, 1873

History

France
- Name: Atalante
- Builder: Cherbourg
- Laid down: June 1865
- Launched: 9 April 1868
- Commissioned: 1869
- Fate: Condemned 1887; foundered afterwards and sank

General characteristics
- Class & type: Alma-class ironclad
- Displacement: 3,825 t (3,765 long tons)
- Length: 68.78 m (225 ft 8 in)
- Beam: 14.2 m (46 ft 7 in)
- Draft: 6.56 m (21 ft 6 in) (mean)
- Installed power: 4 boilers; 1,640 ihp (1,220 kW)
- Propulsion: 1 shaft, 1 steam engine
- Sail plan: Barque-rig
- Speed: 11 knots (20 km/h; 13 mph)
- Range: 1,460 nmi (2,700 km; 1,680 mi) at 10 knots (19 km/h; 12 mph)
- Complement: 316
- Armament: 6 × single 194 mm (7.6 in) Mle 1864 guns; 4 × single 120 mm (4.7 in) guns
- Armor: Belt: 150 mm (5.9 in); Battery: 120 mm (4.7 in); Barbettes: 100 mm (3.9 in); Bulkheads: 120 mm (4.7 in)

The French ironclad Atalante was a wooden-hulled armored corvette built for the French Navy in the mid-1860s. She played a minor role in the Franco-Prussian War of 1870, bombarded Vietnamese forts during the Battle of Thuận An in 1884 and participated in the Sino-French War of 1884–1885. Atalante was reduced to reserve in Saigon, French Indochina, in 1885 and sank there two years later after having been condemned.

== Design and description ==
The Alma-class ironclads (Note: Ironclad is the all-encompassing term for armored warships of this period. Armored corvettes were originally designed for the same role as traditional wooden corvettes, but this rapidly changed as the size and expense of these ships caused them to be used as second-class armored ships.) were designed as improved versions of the armored corvette Belliqueuse suitable for foreign deployments. Unlike their predecessor the Alma-class ships were true central battery ironclads as they were fitted with armored transverse bulkheads. Like most ironclads of their era they were equipped with a metal-reinforced ram.

Atalante measured 68.78 meters (225 ft 8 in) between perpendiculars, with a beam of 14.2 meters (46 ft 7 in). She had a mean draft of 6.56 meters (21 ft 6 in) and displaced 3,825 metric tons (3,765 long tons). Her crew numbered 316 officers and men.

=== Propulsion ===
The ship had a single horizontal return connecting-rod steam engine driving a single propeller. Her engine was powered by four oval boilers. On sea trials the engine produced 1,640 indicated horsepower (1,220 kW) and the ship reached 11.56 knots (21.41 km/h; 13.30 mph). Atalante carried 250 metric tons (250 long tons) of coal which allowed the ship to steam for 1,460 nautical miles (2,700 km; 1,680 mi) at a speed of 10 knots (19 km/h; 12 mph). She was barque-rigged and had a sail area of 1,338 square meters (14,400 sq ft).

=== Armament ===
Atalante mounted her four 194-millimeter (7.6 in) Modèle 1864 breech-loading guns in the central battery on the battery deck. The other two 194-millimeter guns were mounted in barbettes on the upper deck, sponsoned out over the sides of the ship. The four 120-millimeter (4.7 in) guns were also mounted on the upper deck. She may have exchanged her Mle 1864 guns for Mle 1870 guns. The armor-piercing shell of the 20-caliber Mle 1870 gun weighed 165.3 pounds (75 kg) while the gun itself weighed 7.83 long tons (7.96 t). The gun fired its shell at a muzzle velocity of 1,739 ft/s (530 m/s) and was credited with the ability to penetrate a nominal 12.5 inches (320 mm) of wrought iron armour at the muzzle. The guns could fire both solid shot and explosive shells.

=== Armor ===
Atalante had a complete 150-millimeter (5.9 in) wrought iron waterline belt, approximately 2.4 meters (7.9 ft) high. The sides of the battery itself were armored with 120 millimeters (4.7 in) of wrought iron and the ends of the battery were closed by bulkheads of the same thickness. The barbette armor was 100 millimeters (3.9 in) thick, backed by 240 millimeters (9.4 in) of wood. The unarmored portions of her sides were protected by 15-millimeter (0.6 in) iron plates.

== Service ==
Atalante was laid down at Cherbourg in June 1865 and launched on 12 April 1867. Her sea trials began on 1 April 1869 and she joined the reserve at Brest on 11 July 1869. Atalante was commissioned on 23 February 1870 and was initially assigned to the Evolutionary Squadron before transferring to the Northern Squadron in July 1870 at the outbreak of the Franco-Prussian War. The squadron was ordered to lift its blockade of the Prussian North Sea ports on 16 September and return to Cherbourg. Atalante went back into reserve in November 1870, but she was recommissioned the following year.

She was named as the flagship of the Pacific Squadron on 1 July 1872 under command of Rear Admiral Baron Roussin. On 14 August Atalante sailed from Lorient for the Pacific. On 8 August 1873, Atalante was put into the Fitzroy Dock at the Cockatoo Island Dockyard in Sydney, Australia. At the time she was the largest vessel to be drydocked in the harbour and the first ironclad to be docked in the Southern hemisphere.

She returned on 27 February 1874 where she placed into reserve but was recommissioned on 28 December 1875 as the flagship of the China Squadron under Rear Admiral Veron. She departed Lorient on 10 January 1876, but returned on 16 May 1878. The ship spent the next four years in reserve before being recommissioned on 3 July 1882 for service with the Cochinchina Division (division navale de Cochinchine).

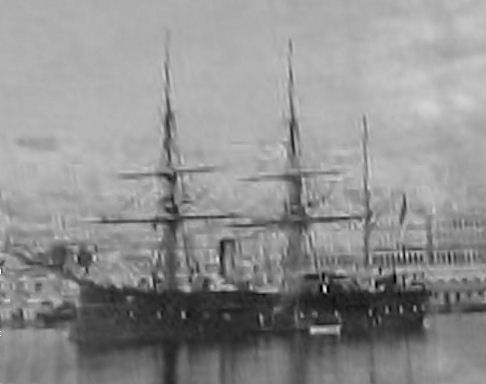
French Navy Atalante

Atalante was transferred to the new Tonkin Coast Division (French: division navale des côtes du Tonkin) when it was formed in 1883. During 18–21 August 1883 she participated in the Battle of Thuận An. This was an attack by the French on the forts defending the mouth of the Perfume River, leading to the Vietnamese capital of Huế in an attempt to intimidate the Vietnamese government. Atalante was assigned to bombard the North Fort by the French commander, Vice Admiral Amédée Courbet. After two days of bombardment a landing party from the ship captured the fort. Ensign (French: Enseigne de vaisseau) Louis-Marie-Julien Viaud, who was aboard the Atalante during the battle and participated in the landing, wrote several articles graphically describing his experiences that were published in the newspaper Le Figaro under the pen-name of Pierre Loti.

The ship was assigned to the Far East Squadron (escadre de l'Extrême-Orient) under Admiral Courbet when it was formed by the amalgamation of the Tonkin Coast and Far Eastern Divisions in June 1884 in preparation for the Sino-French War of 1884–85. In early September 1884 Atalante was in Huế, but she carried Admiral Courbet to Keelung on 23 September. The ship was paid off into reserve in Saigon in 1885 and condemned two years later. She fell into such a state of disrepair that "she foundered one night and gradually sank into the mud."
