= French ship Forfait =

At least two ships of the French Navy have borne the name Forfait:

- French corvette Forfait, a screw corvette launched in 1859 and sunk in a collision in 1875
- French cruiser Forfait, a Villars-class cruiser launched in 1879 and stricken in 1897
