= Forfait =

Forfait may refer to:

- Pierre-Alexandre-Laurent Forfait (1752–1807), French engineer, hydrographer, politician, and Minister of the Navy
- French corvette Forfait, a French Navy screw corvette that entered service in 1860 and was sunk in a collision in 1875

== See also ==
- Forfaiting
