= French ironclad Thétis =

French Alma-class ironclad

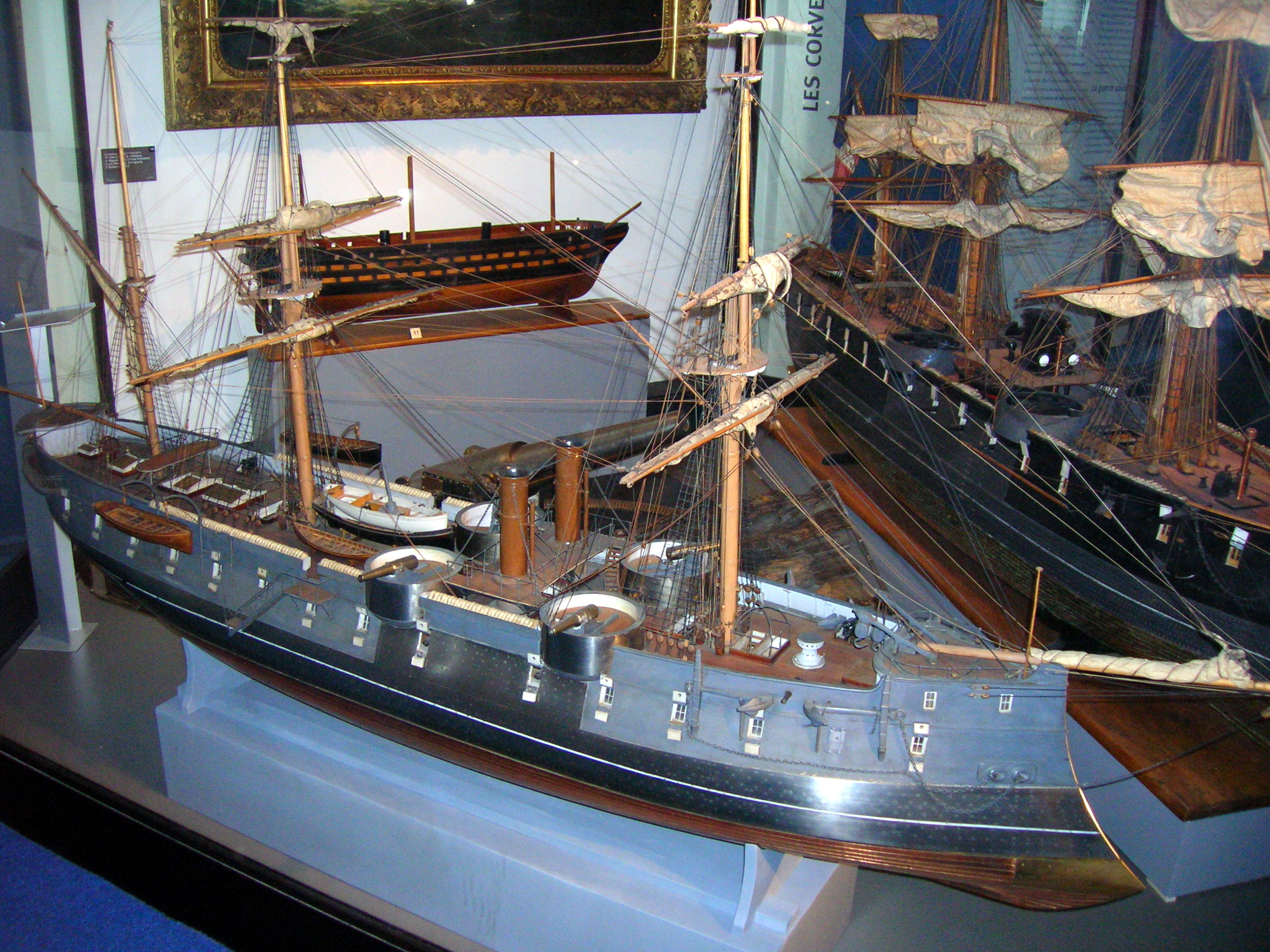
- Model of her sister Jeanne d'Arc on display at the Musée de la Marine in Paris, before the rear barbettes were deleted

History

France
- Name: Thétis
- Namesake: Greek goddess Thetis
- Builder: Toulon
- Laid down: 1865
- Launched: 22 August 1867
- Commissioned: 1869
- Fate: hulked after 1885

General characteristics
- Class & type: Alma-class ironclad
- Displacement: 3,569 t (3,513 long tons)
- Length: 69.03 m (226 ft 6 in)
- Beam: 14.13 m (46 ft 4 in)
- Draft: 6.26 m (20.5 ft) (mean)
- Installed power: 4 boilers; 1,676 ihp (1,250 kW)
- Propulsion: 1 shaft, 1 steam engine
- Sail plan: Barque-rig
- Speed: 11 knots (20 km/h; 13 mph)
- Range: 1,620 nautical miles (3,000 km; 1,860 mi) at 10 knots (19 km/h; 12 mph)
- Complement: 316
- Armament: 6 × single 194 mm (7.6 in) Mle 1864 guns; 4 × single 120 mm (4.7 in) guns
- Armor: Belt: 150 mm (5.9 in); Battery: 120 mm (4.7 in); Barbettes: 100 mm (3.9 in); Bulkheads: 120 mm (4.7 in)

The French ironclad Thétis was a wooden-hulled armored corvette built for the French Navy in the late 1860s. She was named for the Greek sea-goddess Thetis. During the Franco-Prussian War of 1870–1871 she was assigned to a squadron of French ships that attempted to blockade the Prussian ports in the Baltic Sea in 1870. She accidentally rammed her sister Reine Blanche in 1877. En route to the Pacific in 1884 her propeller fell off and she had to return to France under sail. Thétis was eventually hulked in New Caledonia.

== Design and description ==
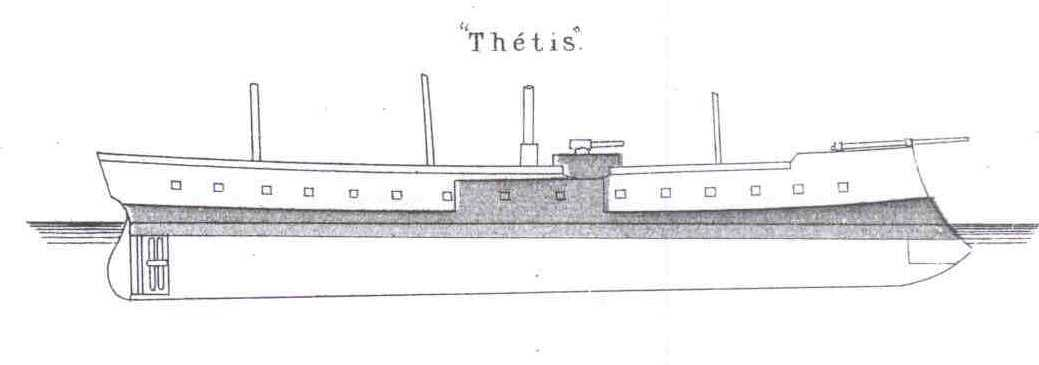

The Alma-class ironclads (Note: Ironclad is the all-encompassing term for armored warships of this period. Armored corvettes were originally designed for the same role as traditional wooden corvettes, but this rapidly changed as the size and expense of these ships caused them to be used as second-class armored ships.) were designed as improved versions of the armored corvette Belliqueuse suitable for foreign deployments. Unlike their predecessor the Alma-class ships were true central battery ironclads as they were fitted with armored transverse bulkheads. Like most ironclads of their era they were equipped with a metal-reinforced ram.

Thétis measured 69.03 meters (226 ft 6 in) between perpendiculars, with a beam of 14.13 meters (46 ft 4 in). She had a mean draft of 6.26 meters (20 ft 6 in) and displaced 3,569 metric tons (3,513 long tons). Her crew numbered 316 officers and men.

=== Propulsion ===
The ship had a single horizontal return connecting-rod steam engine driving a single propeller. Her engine was powered by four oval boilers. On sea trials the engine produced 1,676 indicated horsepower (1,250 kW) and the ship reached 11.99 knots (22.21 km/h; 13.80 mph). Unlike all of her sisters except Jeanne d'Arc, she had two funnels, mounted side-by-side. Thétis carried 250 metric tons (250 long tons) of coal which allowed the ship to steam for 1,620 nautical miles (3,000 km; 1,860 mi) at a speed of 10 knots (19 km/h; 12 mph). She was barque-rigged and had a sail area of 1,453 square meters (15,640 sq ft).

=== Armament ===
Thétis mounted her four 194-millimeter (7.6 in) Modèle 1864 breech-loading guns in the central battery on the battery deck. The other two 194-millimeter guns were mounted in barbettes on the upper deck, sponsoned out over the sides of the ship. The four 120-millimeter (4.7 in) guns were also mounted on the upper deck. She may have exchanged her Mle 1864 guns for Mle 1870 guns. The armor-piercing shell of the 20-caliber Mle 1870 gun weighed 165.3 pounds (75 kg) while the gun itself weighed 7.83 long tons (7.96 t). The gun fired its shell at a muzzle velocity of 1,739 ft/s (530 m/s) and was credited with the ability to penetrate a nominal 12.5 inches (320 mm) of wrought iron armour at the muzzle. The guns could fire both solid shot and explosive shells.

=== Armor ===
Thétis had a complete 150-millimeter (5.9 in) wrought iron waterline belt, approximately 2.4 meters (7.9 ft) high. The sides of the battery itself were armored with 120 millimeters (4.7 in) of wrought iron and the ends of the battery were closed by bulkheads of the same thickness. The barbette armor was 100 millimeters (3.9 in) thick, backed by 240 millimeters (9.4 in) of wood. The unarmored portions of her sides were protected by 15-millimeter (0.6 in) iron plates.

== Service ==
Thétis, named for the Greek sea-goddess Thetis, was laid down at Toulon in 1865 and launched on 22 August 1867. The ship began her sea trials on 1 May 1868 and was put into reserve at Brest the following year. She was commissioned on 20 July 1870 for the Franco-Prussian War and assigned to the Northern Squadron. On 24 July 1870 she departed Cherbourg in company with the rest of the Northern Squadron and they cruised off the Danish port of Frederikshavn between 28 July and 2 August until they entered the Baltic Sea. The squadron, now renamed the Baltic Squadron, remained in the Baltic, attempting to blockade Prussian ports on the Baltic until ordered to return to Cherbourg on 16 September. The ship was assigned to the Evolutionary Squadron in 1871 and detached to the Levant Squadron the following year.

During the Cantonal Revolution Thétis and her sister Reine Blanche spent much of September–October 1873 in the port of Cartagena, Spain where they could protect French citizens. She became the temporary flagship of Vice Admiral Roze after 31 October 1875 when the armored frigate Magenta caught fire and exploded in Toulon. Thétis was paid off on 1 March 1876, but was recommissioned on 18 April 1877 for service with the Evolutionary Squadron.

On 3 July 1877 she accidentally rammed Reine Blanche who had to be run ashore to prevent her from sinking. The ship was in reserve between 1878 and 1881 although she was intended to be used as the flagship of the Pacific Squadron. Her sister Montcalm was sent instead. On 8 October 1885 she was commissioned as the flagship of Rear Admiral Marcq de St. Hilaire and sailed for the Pacific. Thétis lost her propeller off Madeira and had to return to Cherbourg under sail where the admiral transferred his flag to the Champlain. She ended her days as a hulk in Nouméa, New Caledonia.
