= French ironclad Montcalm =

French Alma-class ironclad

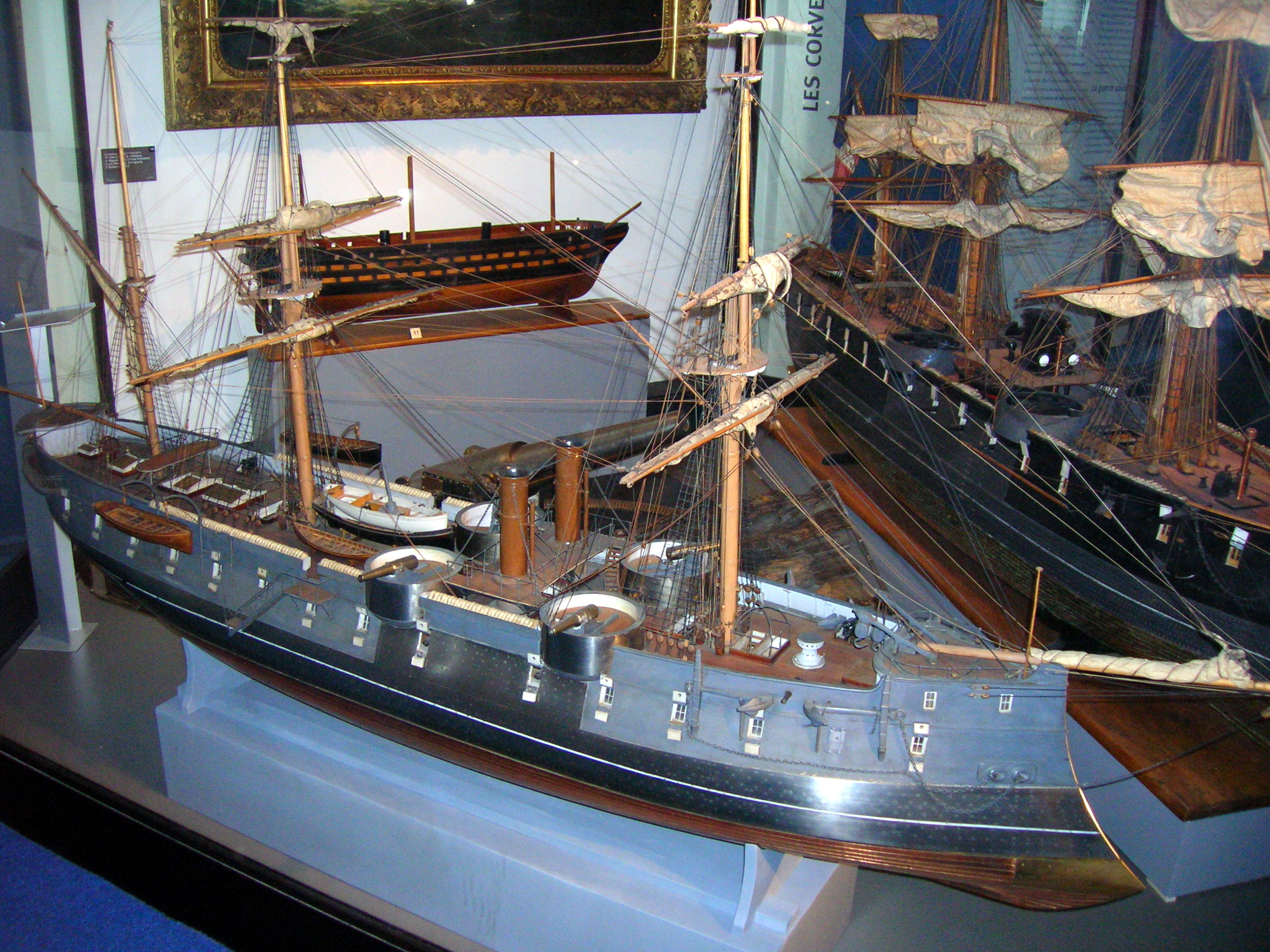
- Model of her sister Jeanne d'Arc on display at the Musée de la Marine in Paris, before the rear barbettes were deleted

History

France
- Name: Montcalm
- Namesake: Louis de Montcalm de Saint Véran
- Builder: Rochefort
- Laid down: 26 October 1865
- Launched: 16 October 1868
- Commissioned: 1870
- Fate: Condemned 2 April 1891

General characteristics
- Class & type: Alma-class ironclad
- Displacement: 3,889 t (3,828 long tons)
- Length: 68.75 m (225 ft 7 in)
- Beam: 14.13 m (46 ft 4 in)
- Draft: 6.66 m (21 ft 10 in) (mean)
- Installed power: 1,830 ihp (1,360 kW)
- Propulsion: 1 shaft, 1 steam engine
- Sail plan: Barque-rig
- Speed: 11 knots (20 km/h; 13 mph)
- Range: 1,460 nmi (2,700 km; 1,680 mi) at 10 knots (19 km/h; 12 mph)
- Complement: 316
- Armament: 6 × single 194 mm (7.6 in) Mle 1864 guns; 4 × single 120 mm (4.7 in) guns
- Armor: Belt: 150 mm (5.9 in); Battery: 120 mm (4.7 in); Barbettes: 100 mm (3.9 in); Bulkheads: 120 mm (4.7 in)

The French ironclad Montcalm was a wooden-hulled armored corvette built for the French Navy in the mid-1860s. She was named after Major General Montcalm who lost the Battle of the Plains of Abraham in 1759. She played a minor role in the Franco-Prussian War of 1870–1871 where she captured one Prussian sailing ship. Montcalm spent most of her later career abroad, either in Chinese waters or in the Pacific Ocean. The ship was condemned in 1891.

== Design and description ==
The Alma-class ironclads (Note: Ironclad is the all-encompassing term for armored warships of this period. Armored corvettes were originally designed for the same role as traditional wooden corvettes, but this rapidly changed as the size and expense of these ships caused them to be used as second-class armored ships.) were designed as improved versions of the armored corvette Belliqueuse suitable for foreign deployments. Unlike their predecessor the Alma-class ships were true central battery ironclads as they were fitted with armored transverse bulkheads. Like most ironclads of their era they were equipped with a metal-reinforced ram.

Montcalm measured 68.75 meters (225 ft 7 in) between perpendiculars, with a beam of 14.13 meters (46 ft 4 in). She had a mean draft of 6.66 meters (21 ft 10 in) and displaced 3,889 metric tons (3,828 long tons). Her crew numbered 316 officers and men.

=== Propulsion ===
The ship had a single horizontal return connecting-rod steam engine driving a single propeller. Her engine was powered by four oval boilers. On sea trials, the engine produced 1,830 indicated horsepower (1,360 kW) and the ship reached 11.65 knots (21.58 km/h; 13.41 mph). Montcalm carried 250 metric tons (250 long tons) of coal which allowed the ship to steam for 1,460 nautical miles (2,700 km; 1,680 mi) at a speed of 10 knots (19 km/h; 12 mph). She was barque-rigged and had a sail area of 1,438 square meters (15,480 sq ft).

=== Armament ===
Montcalm mounted her four 194-millimeter (7.6 in) Modèle 1864 breech-loading guns in the central battery on the battery deck. The other two 194-millimeter guns were mounted in barbettes on the upper deck, sponsoned out over the sides of the ship. The four 120-millimeter (4.7 in) guns were also mounted on the upper deck. She may have exchanged her Mle 1864 guns for Mle 1870 guns. The armor-piercing shell of the 20-caliber Mle 1870 gun weighed 165.3 pounds (75 kg) while the gun itself weighed 7.83 long tons (7.96 t). The gun fired its shell at a muzzle velocity of 1,739 ft/s (530 m/s) and was credited with the ability to penetrate a nominal 12.5 inches (320 mm) of wrought iron armour at the muzzle. The guns could fire both solid shot and explosive shells.

=== Armor ===
Montcalm had a complete 150-millimeter (5.9 in) wrought iron waterline belt, approximately 2.4 meters (7.9 ft) high. The sides of the battery itself were armored with 120 millimeters (4.7 in) of wrought iron and the ends of the battery were closed by bulkheads of the same thickness. The barbette armor was 100 millimeters (3.9 in) thick, backed by 240 millimeters (9.4 in) of wood. The unarmored portions of her sides were protected by 15-millimeter (0.6 in) iron plates.

== Service ==
Montcalm was laid down at Rochefort on 26 October 1865 and launched on 16 October 1868. The ship began her sea trials on 16 June 1869 and was then sent to the Mediterranean until May 1870. During the Franco-Prussian War, she captured the German barque Union in the North Sea and watched the Prussian corvette SMS Arcona in Portuguese waters. She cruised the North and South Atlantic before being put in reserve on 1 August 1871 at Cherbourg. Recommissioned on 20 October 1873, she sailed for China on 5 January 1874 to relieve the armored corvette Belliqueuse as flagship of the China Station. Montcalm arrived back in Cherbourg on 20 May 1876 and was reduced to reserve from 1878 to 1880. In 1882, she became flagship for the Pacific division under command of Rear Admiral Landolfe. Back to Cherbourg in 1884, she remained there until 2 April 1891 when she was condemned.
