= French ironclad Armide =

French naval vessel

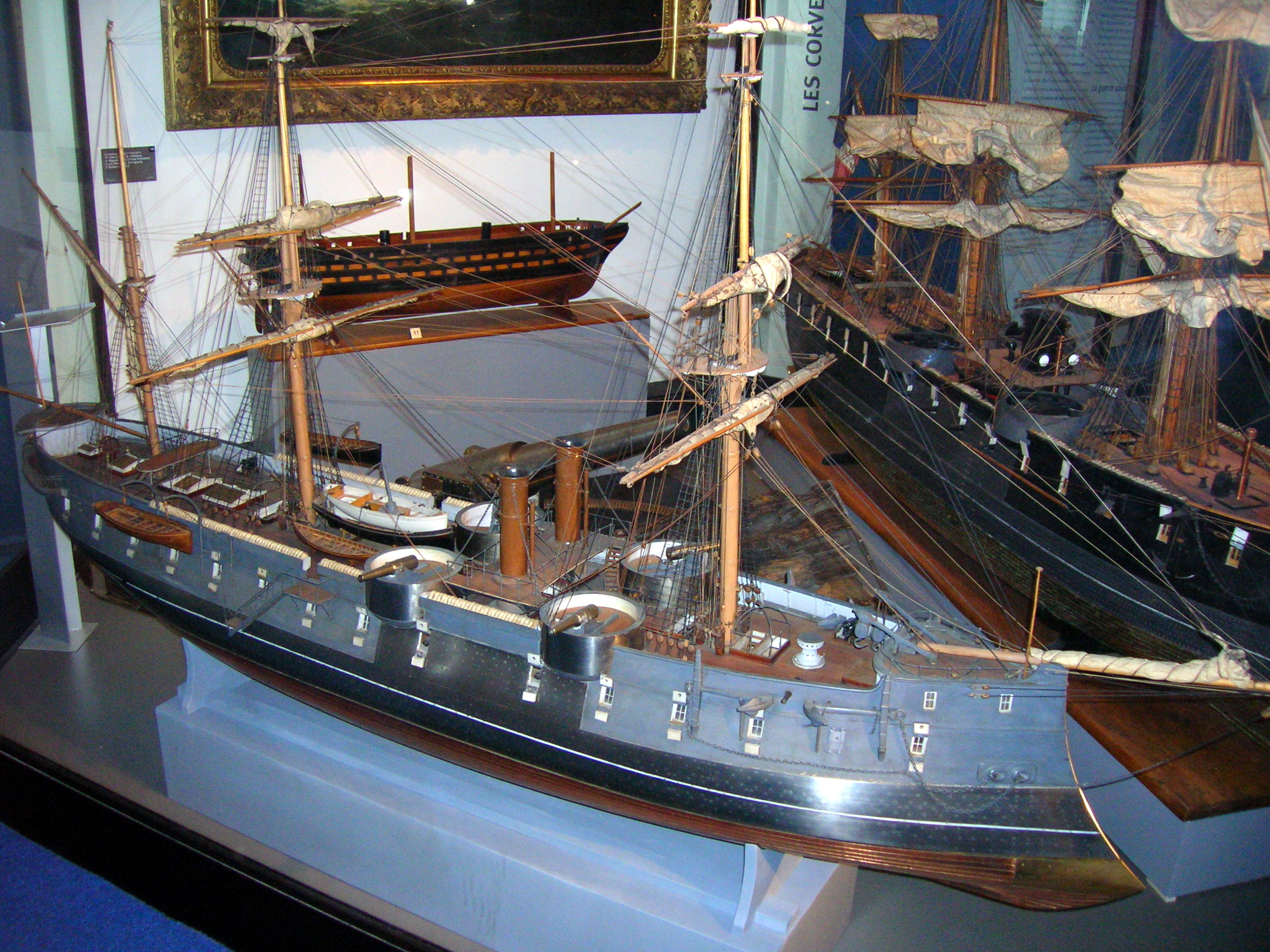
- Model of her sister ship Jeanne d'Arc on display at the Musée de la Marine in Paris, before the rear barbettes were deleted.

History

France
- Name: Armide
- Namesake: Armida
- Builder: Rochefort
- Laid down: 1865
- Launched: 24 April 1867
- Commissioned: 20 July 1870
- Fate: used as a target for gunnery trials, 1886

General characteristics
- Class & type: Alma-class ironclad
- Displacement: 3,692 t (3,634 long tons)
- Length: 68.9 m (226 ft 1 in)
- Beam: 14.06 m (46 ft 2 in)
- Draft: 6.43 m (21 ft 1 in) (mean)
- Installed power: 4 boilers; 1,585 ihp (1,182 kW)
- Propulsion: 1 shaft, 1 steam engine
- Sail plan: Barque-rig
- Speed: 10 knots (19 km/h; 12 mph)
- Range: 1,310 nautical miles (2,430 km; 1,510 mi) at 10 knots (19 km/h; 12 mph)
- Complement: 316
- Armament: 6 × single 194 mm (7.6 in) Mle 1864 guns; 4 × single 120 mm (4.7 in) guns
- Armor: Belt: 150 mm (5.9 in); Battery: 120 mm (4.7 in); Barbettes: 100 mm (3.9 in); Bulkheads: 120 mm (4.7 in)

The French ironclad Armide was a wooden-hulled armored corvette built for the French Navy in the mid-1860s. Placed into reserve after completion, she was first mobilized for the Franco-Prussian War of 1870–1871. She spent the rest of her career in the Mediterranean and then in the Far East as flagship of the French squadrons there, until her decommissioning in 1880. Armide was use as a target for gunnery trials in 1886.

== Design and description ==
The Alma-class ironclads (Note: Ironclad is the all-encompassing term for armored warships of this period. Armored corvettes were originally designed for the same role as traditional wooden corvettes, but this rapidly changed as the size and expense of these ships caused them to be used as second-class armored ships.) were designed as improved versions of the armored corvette Belliqueuse suitable for foreign deployments. Unlike their predecessor the Alma-class ships were true central battery ironclads as they were fitted with armored transverse bulkheads. Like most ironclads of their era they were equipped with a metal-reinforced ram.

Armide measured 68.9 meters (226 ft 1 in) between perpendiculars, with a beam of 14.06 meters (46 ft 2 in). She had a mean draft of 6.43 meters (21 ft 1 in) and displaced 3,692 metric tons (3,634 long tons). Her crew numbered 316 officers and men.

=== Propulsion ===
The ship had a single horizontal three-cylinder return connecting-rod steam engine driving a single four-bladed propeller. Her engine was powered by four Creusot oval boilers. On sea trials the engine produced 1,585 indicated horsepower (1,182 kW) and the ship reached 10.48 knots (19.41 km/h; 12.06 mph). Armide carried 250 metric tons (250 long tons) of coal which allowed the ship to steam for 1,310 nautical miles (2,430 km; 1,510 mi) at a speed of 10 knots (19 km/h; 12 mph). She was barque-rigged and had a sail area of 1,454 square meters (15,650 sq ft).

=== Armament ===
Armide mounted her four 194-millimeter (7.6 in) Modèle 1864 breech-loading guns in the central battery on the battery deck. The other two 194 mm guns were mounted in barbettes on the upper deck, sponsoned out over the sides of the ship. The four 120-millimeter (4.7 in) guns were also mounted on the upper deck. She may have exchanged her Mle 1864 guns for Mle 1870 guns. The armor-piercing shell of the 20-caliber Mle 1870 gun weighed 165.3 pounds (75 kg) while the gun itself weighed 7.83 long tons (7.96 t). The gun fired its shell at a muzzle velocity of 1,739 ft/s (530 m/s) and was credited with the ability to penetrate a nominal 12.5 inches (320 mm) of wrought iron armour at the muzzle. The guns could fire both solid shot and explosive shells.

=== Armor ===
Armide had a complete 150-millimeter (5.9 in) wrought iron waterline belt, approximately 2.4 meters (7.9 ft) high. The sides of the battery itself were armored with 120 millimeters (4.7 in) of wrought iron and the ends of the battery were closed by bulkheads of the same thickness. The barbette armor was 100 millimeters (3.9 in) thick, backed by 240 millimeters (9.4 in) of wood. The unarmored portions of her sides were protected by 15-millimeter (0.6 in) iron plates.

== Service ==
Armide was laid down at Rochefort in 1865 and launched on 12 April 1867. The ship began her sea trials on 5 October 1867 and was put into reserve at Brest immediately after her completion. She was commissioned on 20 July 1870 to serve with the Baltic Squadron during the Franco-Prussian War. The squadron was ordered to lift its blockade of the Prussian Baltic ports on 16 September and return to Cherbourg. Armide was decommissioned on 1 November, but was recommissioned on 12 January 1871 to blockade the Prussian corvette SMS Arcona in Lisbon for the duration of the war. Afterward she was transferred to the Mediterranean where she remained until 1873.

Armide was decommissioned on 28 October 1873 at Toulon and had her armament reduced to six guns. She was recommissioned as the flagship of the Levant Squadron on 25 August 1874. On 19 September 1875 Armide was in Algiers. The ship was reduced to reserve in December 1875 at Brest. She was recommissioned in 1877 as the flagship of the China Squadron under Rear Admiral Duburquois and departed Brest on 17 January 1878. She was relieved by her sister Thétis on 22 January 1880 at Singapore. She was decommissioned at Toulon on 17 March 1880 and condemned on 25 October 1882. Armide was used in gunnery trials in March 1886 and filled with watertight barrels to keep her from sinking. She was set adrift and fired at by a group of French ironclads at ranges up to 5,000 meters (5,500 yd); she was towed back to port to examine the effects of the shells.
