= Battle of Thuận An =

1883 battle during the French conquest of Vietnam

- Part of the Tonkin campaign
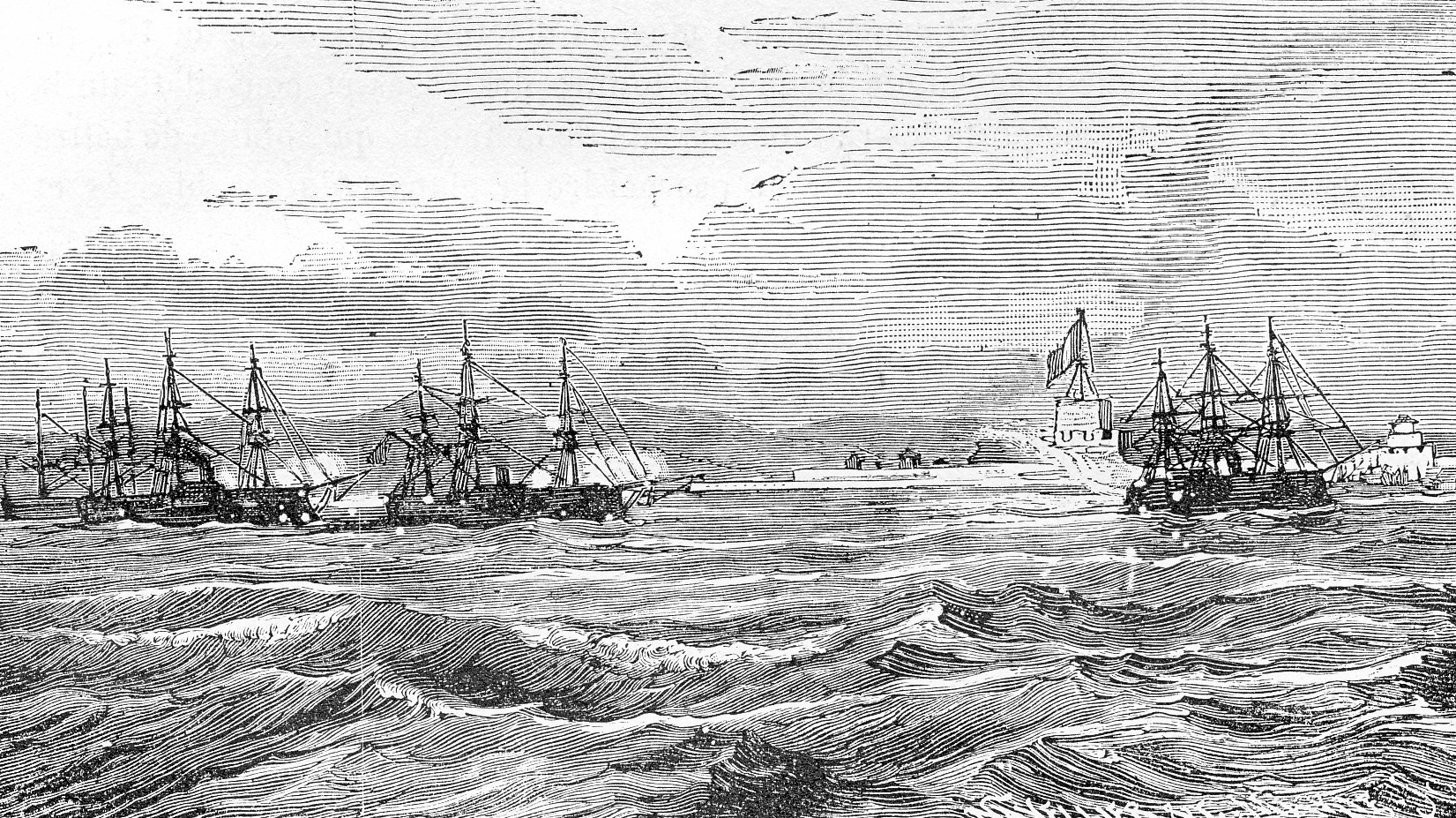
- French warships off the Thuận An forts, 18 August 1883
Date	20 August 1883
Location	near Huế, central Vietnam
Result	French victory: Treaty of Huế

Belligerents
France	Nguyen dynasty

Commanders and leaders
Amédée Courbet	Unknown

Strength
7 ships (Consisting of 2 Gunboats, 2 Ironclads, 1 Cruiser, 1 Transport, and 1 Troopship)	Unknown number of Forts and Guns

Casualties and losses
1 Gunboat lightly damaged 1 Ironclad lightly damaged 12 wounded	2,500 killed and wounded Many Guns captured

The Battle of Thuận An (20 August 1883) was a clash between France and Vietnam during the period of early hostilities of the Tonkin Campaign (1883–1886). During the battle a French landing force under the command of Admiral Amédée Courbet stormed the coastal forts that guarded the river approaches to the Vietnamese capital Huế, enabling the French to dictate a treaty to the Vietnamese that recognised a French protectorate over Tonkin. The French strike against the Vietnamese in August 1883, sanctioned by Jules Ferry's administration in Paris, did more than anything else to make a war between France and China inevitable, and sowed the seeds of the Vietnamese Cần Vương national uprising in July 1885.

== Background ==
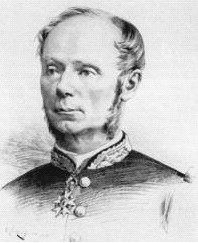
Admiral Anatole-Amédée-Prosper Courbet (1827–85)

On 30 July 1883, Admiral Courbet, General Bouët and Jules Harmand, the French civil commissioner-general for Tonkin, held a council of war at Haiphong. The meeting noted that the Court of Huế was covertly aiding and abetting Liu Yongfu's Black Flag Army, and that the Vietnamese commander-in-chief Prince Hoàng Kế Viêm was openly in arms against the French at Nam Định. The three men agreed that Bouët should launch an offensive against the Black Flag Army in its positions around Phu Hoai on the Day River as soon as possible. They also decided, largely on Harmand's urging, to recommend to the French government a strike against the Vietnamese defences of Huế, followed by an ultimatum requiring the Vietnamese to accept a French protectorate over Tonkin or face immediate attack. Jules Ferry's government was initially reluctant to sanction an attack on Huế, fearing that it might provoke a response from China, but the French minister to China, Arthur Tricou, convinced the French government that China would acquiesce in a French 'act of virility'.

On 11 August the navy minister Charles Brun approved Harmand and Courbet's proposal for a naval descent on Huế to coerce the Vietnamese court. The aim of the expedition was to put a landing force ashore to capture the Thuận An forts, which guarded the entrance to the River of Perfumes, after a preliminary bombardment by the warships of Courbet's Tonkin Coasts naval division. As the Tonkin Expeditionary Corps would be fully committed to Bouët's projected attack on the Black Flag Army, it was agreed that the landing near Huế would be made by troops from the French garrisons in Cochinchina.

On 16 August, Courbet left Along Bay aboard his flagship Bayard, and on 16 August anchored at the entrance to the Perfume River and scouted the Thuận An fortifications. Meanwhile, a strong flotilla of the Tonkin Coasts naval division had concentrated in Tourane Bay. Courbet's naval force for the descent on Huế consisted of the ironclads Bayard and Atalante, the cruiser Châteaurenault, the gunboats Lynx and Vipère, and the transport Drac. This force was joined by the troopship Annamite, which sailed up from Saigon with a landing force of 600 marine infantry and 100 Cochinchinese riflemen and a marine artillery battery. (Note: The landing force included the 27th and 31st Companies, 1st Marine Infantry Regiment (Captains Moniot and Sorin) and the 22nd Marine Artillery Battery (Captain Luce). The detachment of Cochinchinese riflemen was commanded by Lieutenant Vincentelli. The marine infantry were under the overall command of Captain Radiguet.)

== Courbet's flotilla in the Thuận An campaign ==
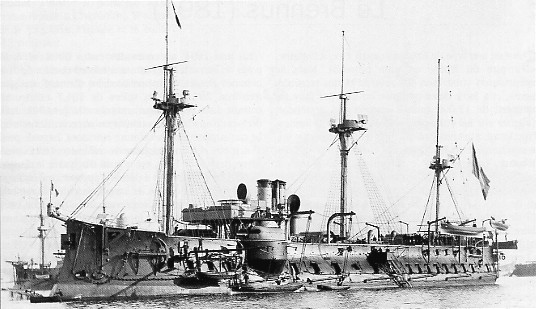
Bayard

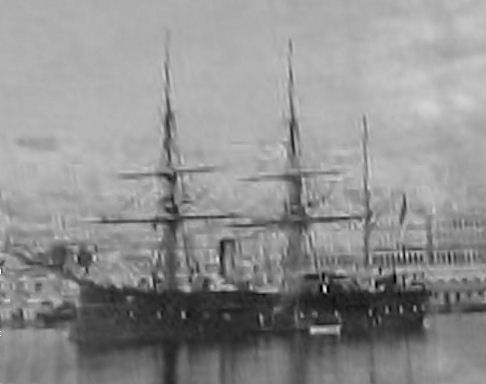
Atalante

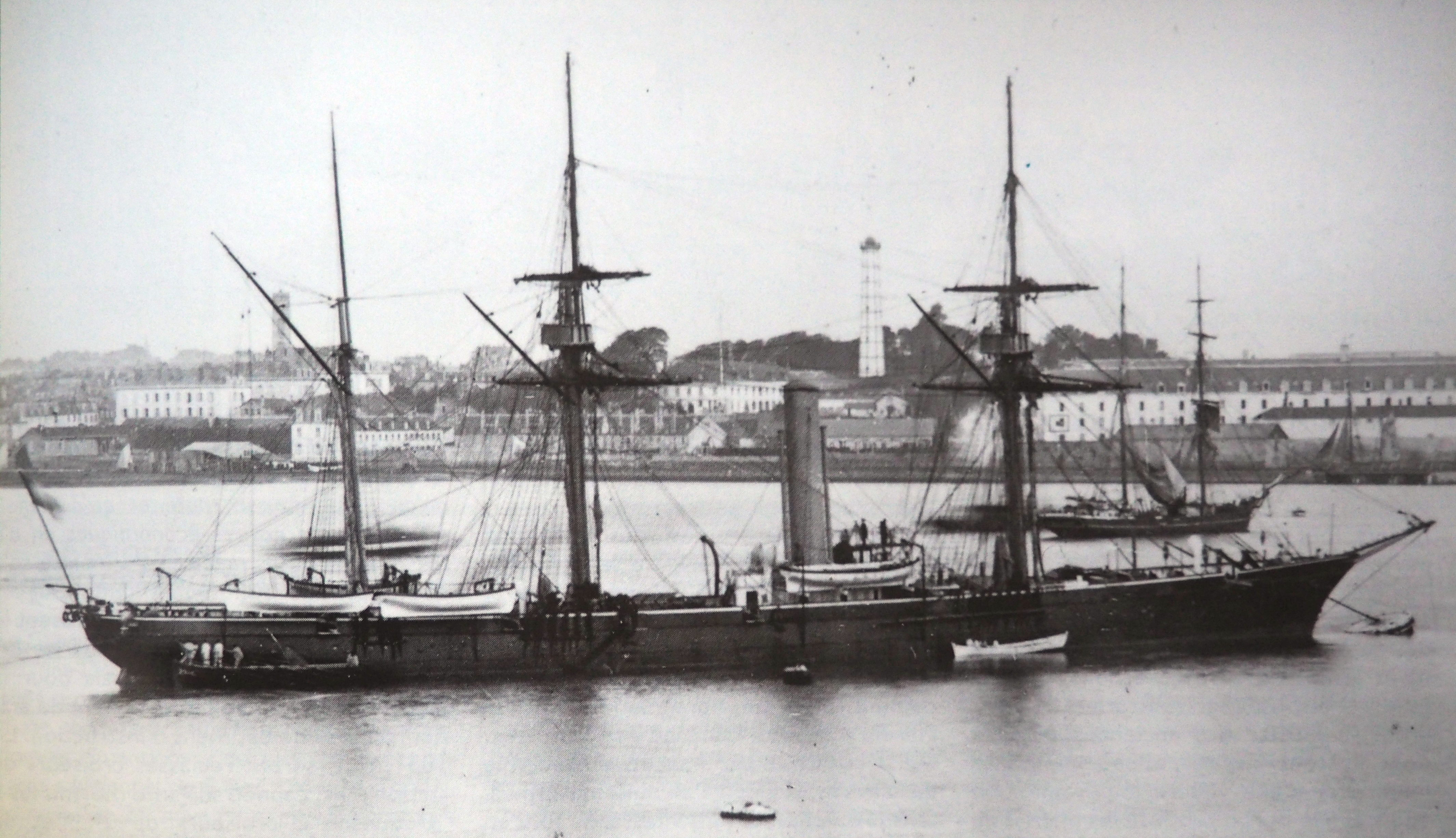
Châteaurenault

== The naval bombardment ==
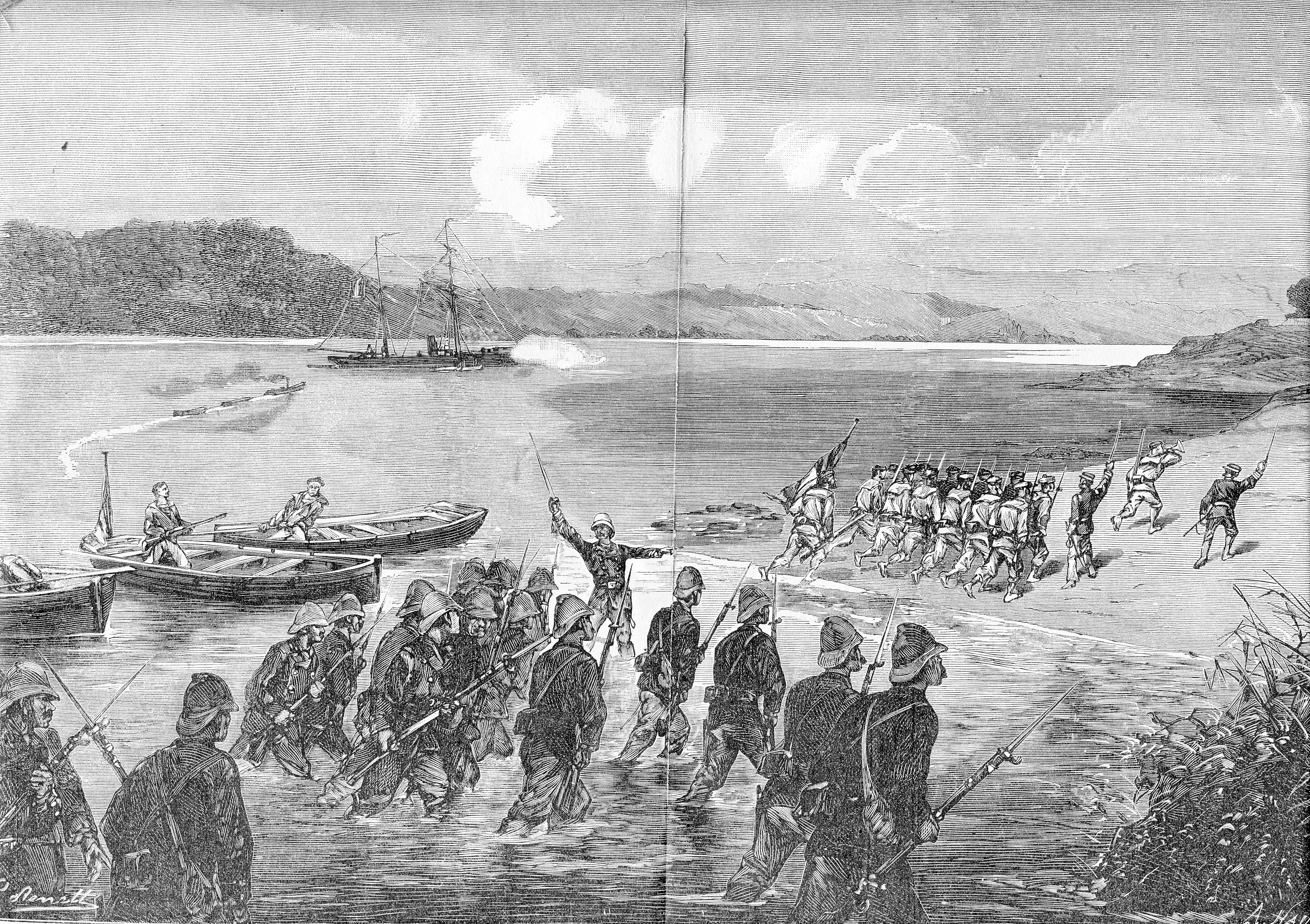
French sailors and marine infantry go ashore at Thuận An, 20 August 1883

Courbet returned to Tourane Bay with Bayard on the evening of 16 August and issued his orders for an attack on the Thuận An forts on 18 August. On 17 August the French rehearsed their plans for the attack. The French naval division left Tourane at 8 a.m. on 18 August, in order of battle with Bayard at its head, and anchored off the entrance to the Huế River around 2 p.m. The ships took up positions for the impending attack. Bayard took station at the entrance to the river, to be able to fire both upon the southern forts and on the large northern fort, 2,000 metres away. Châteaurenault was a little to the east, and was charged with attacking the southern forts only. Atalante, to the west of Bayard, was tasked with attacking the large northern fort, and Drac, anchored on the western flank of the French line, was to take on the small forts at the end of the enemy positions. The gunboats Lynx and Vipère, placed between Atalante and Drac, were to move in close and protect the landing. Annamite remained in the rear.

An attempt to negotiate was made by the Vietnamese, and discussions took up much of the afternoon. Courbet finally demanded that the Thuận An forts should be handed over to the French within two hours. This ultimatum was delivered by the Vietnamese envoys to the fort commanders, who declined to reply.

At 5.40 p.m. on 18 August the ships of the naval division hoisted a French flag at each masthead, Bayard opened fire, and the entire division immediately followed suit. The light frigate Alouette from Cochinchina joined the division shortly before hostilities commenced, and Courbet ascertained that she had no new orders for him before opening fire. The Vietnamese defenders replied, although outgunned, but the French ships were out of range of their antiquated cannon. The bombardment lasted for just over an hour, until it became too dark to fire effectively. The guns stopped firing at 7 p.m., and the French ships turned on their powerful electric searchlights to illuminate the forts, the Thuận An pass and the sea around their anchorage, in case of an enemy night attack.

Orders were given for a landing at dawn on 19 August. The men turned in early, and when the drums beat to quarters at 4 a.m. the officers and sailors of the landing companies prepared to man the boats. But shortly before dawn Courbet changed his mind and cancelled the landing. The sea was very rough, and he may also have considered that the previous day's bombardment had not done enough damage. At dawn the French resumed their bombardment. To their surprise the Vietnamese replied with a well-aimed salvo of shells which whistled overhead and fell in the sea close around the French ships. They had taken advantage of the darkness to bring up rifled guns with a longer range. Although the French naval division was soon able to silence these guns, they scored a number of minor hits. Vipère and the ironclad Bayard were struck several times during these exchanges of fire, but were not seriously damaged.

== The attack on the Thuận An forts ==
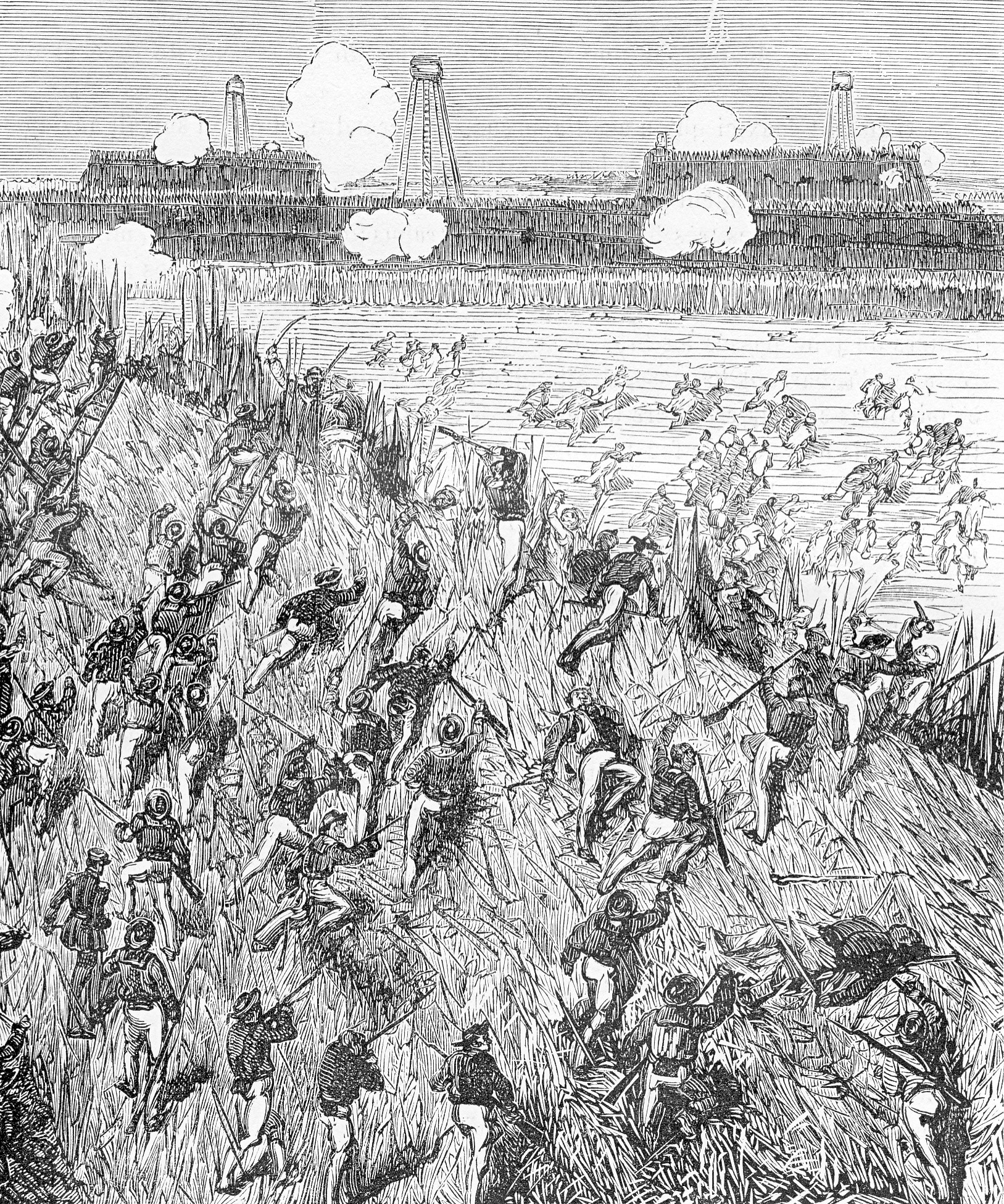
The attack on the Thuận An forts, 20 August 1883

The sun rose on 20 August on a completely calm sea. At 5.30 a.m. Courbet decided to proceed immediately with the landing. Just over a thousand men (the two marine infantry companies, the Cochinchinese riflemen and the landing companies of Bayard, Atalante and Châteaurenault) would go ashore under the command of Captain Parrayon of Bayard and seize the Northern Fort.

The landing was made in two stages. At 5.45 a.m. an advance guard under Parrayon's personal command, consisting of the three ships’ landing companies and two sections of marine infantry, climbed into the launches and made slowly for the shore. Half an hour later this detachment struggled ashore in the sand dunes in front of the Vietnamese defences. The Vietnamese, snug in their trenches overlooking the beach, began to hurl firecrackers at the attackers. Lynx and Vipère, anchored just offshore, responded with cannon and rifle fire, while the crews of the French launches fired their Hotchkiss canons-revolvers. Under this covering fire, the landing companies were able to move slowly forward from the beach.

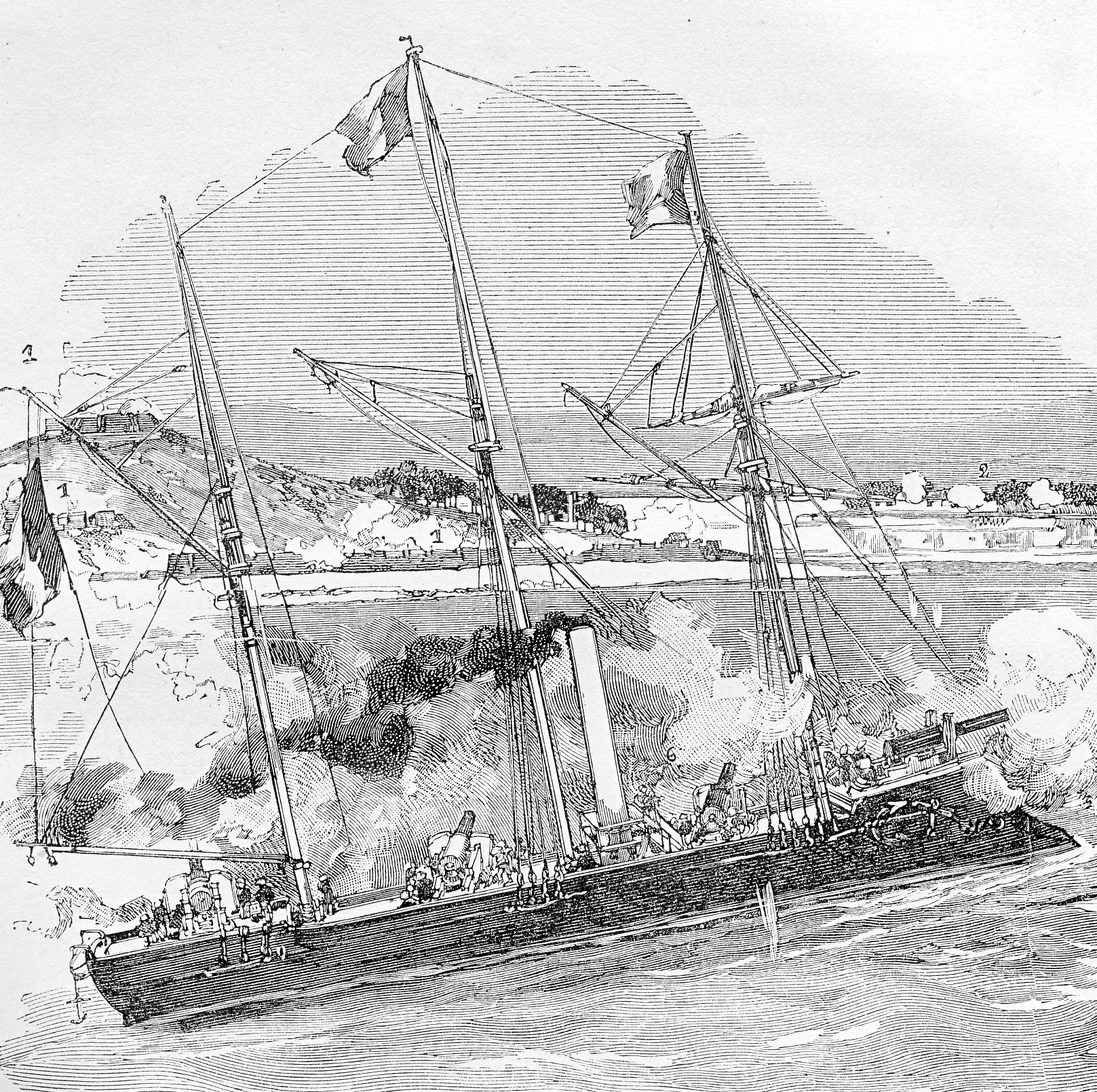
The gunboat Vipère forces the Thuận An barrage, 20 August 1883

A spearhead led by enseigne de vaisseau Olivieri crossed the beach defences and fought a brief action with a party of Vietnamese who left their entrenchments to confront the invaders. The Vietnamese were quickly routed. At the same time the landing company of Atalante came up in support, under the command of lieutenant de vaisseau Poidloue, and captured a battery of cannon commanding a stretch of the river. This feat enabled Parrayon to attack the village and the Northern Fort, which he carried without firing a shot. Meanwhile, the French had, with some difficulty, landed the 65-millimetre guns of Luce's battery on the dunes, and these also supported the French attack. The Vietnamese gradually gave way and eventually retreated, burning the village as they went. The ships of the naval division continued to fire throughout the action, laying down a barrage ahead of the landing force that paved the way for its advance.

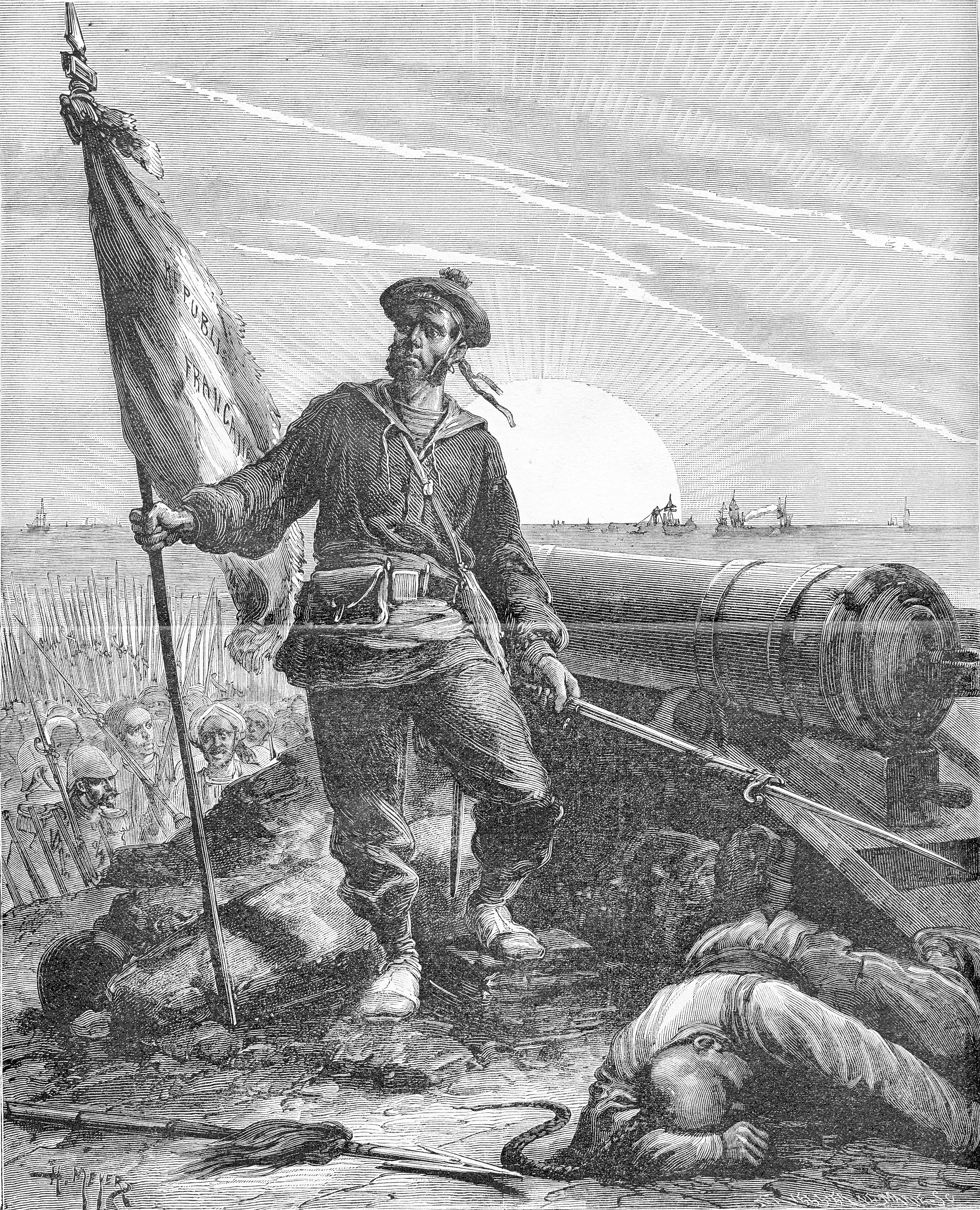
Victory at Thuận An, 20 August 1883

At 8 a.m. Captain Sorin landed with the bulk of the marine infantry and linked up with the first detachment in front of the principal fort. After about an hour's fighting Captain Parrayon, Ensign Olivieri and lieutenant de vaisseau Palma Gourdon (who would later win fame in the Battle of Shipu) were among the first French soldiers to enter the fort. Shortly after 9 a.m. the French flag was hoisted on the citadel's flagpole, to the cheers of all the men of the naval division.

During the morning battle the French had captured the Northern Fort. But the Southern Fort still remained in Vietnamese hands. In the afternoon, in order to prepare the way for an attack on the Southern Fort, the gunboats Lynx and Vipère boldly crossed the river barrage. The fort's guns engaged them gamely, and the two gunboats fired back. Out at sea, Bayard and Châteaurenault added the weight of their own fire to the contest. The French had the better of this artillery duel. The fire from the fort slackened. On the morning of 21 August the division's launches landed a strong French column on the beach opposite the Southern Fort, ready to attack it if necessary. But there was no need. The fort and the neighbouring villages were completely empty. The Annamese had evacuated their last defences, and there was now nothing to stop the French from sailing up the River of Perfumes to Huế.

Vietnamese losses during the bombardment and subsequent landing had been heavy, perhaps 2,500 men killed or wounded. French casualties, by contrast had been derisory, only a dozen men wounded. On the following day Courbet congratulated his troops on their success, singling out the officers and crew of Lynx and Vipère for special commendation.

== The Treaty of Huế ==
The French capture of the Thuận An forts, which exposed Huế to immediate attack, overawed the Vietnamese court. An armistice was quickly agreed with the French. Harmand threatened the Vietnamese with annihilation unless they immediately accepted a French protectorate over both Annam and Tonkin. On 25 August 1883, cowed by the French appeal to force, the Vietnamese signed the Treaty of Huế.

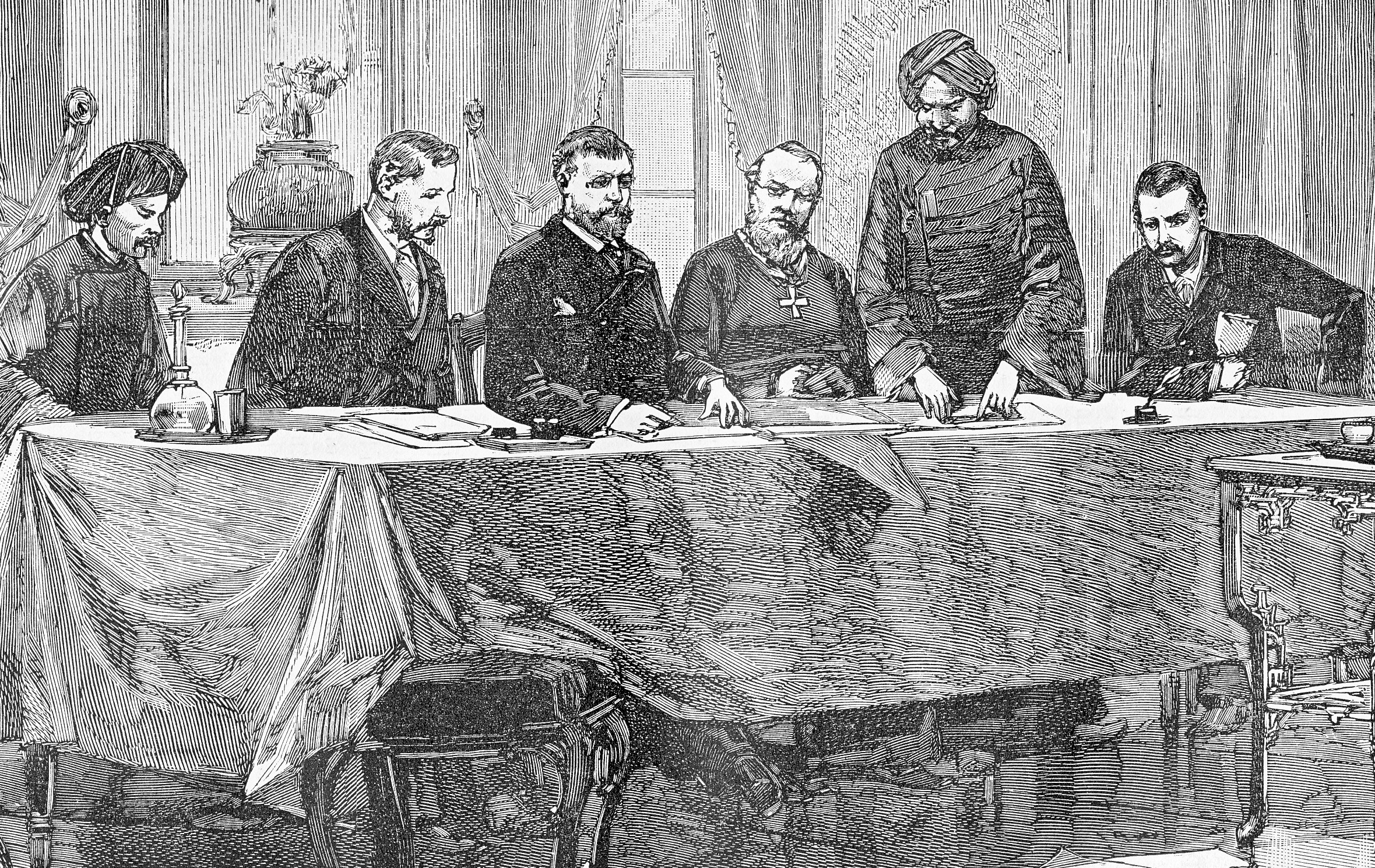
Signature of the Treaty of Huế, 25 August 1883

The Treaty of Huế gave France everything it wanted from Vietnam. The Vietnamese recognised the legitimacy of the French occupation of Cochinchina, accepted a French protectorate both for Annam and Tonkin and promised to withdraw their troops from Tonkin. Vietnam, its royal house and its court survived, but under French direction. France was granted the privilege of stationing a resident-general at Huế, who would work to the civil commissioner-general in Tonkin and could require a personal audience with the Vietnamese king (a concession that the Vietnamese had never before been prepared to make). To ensure there were no second thoughts, a permanent French garrison would occupy the Thuận An forts. Large swathes of territory were also transferred from Annam to Cochinchina and Tonkin. The French cancelled the country's debts, but required in return the cession of the southern province of Bình Thuận, which was annexed to the French colony of Cochinchina. At the same time the northern provinces of Nghệ An, Thanh Hóa and Hà Tĩnh were transferred to Tonkin, where they would come under direct French oversight. In return the French undertook to drive out the Black Flags from Tonkin and to guarantee freedom of commerce on the Red River. These were hardly concessions, since they were planning to do both anyway.

== Order of the day ==
Courbet issued the following order of the day to his sailors and soldiers to commemorate the victory at Thuận An:

Vous avez vaillamment combattu. Vous avez montré une fois de plus ce que la France peut attendre de votre patriotisme. Le roi d'Annam a demandé une suspension d'armes, le commissaire général civil est a Hué pour traiter. En quelques jours, vous avez donné un nouveau prestige au nom français dans l'Extrême-Orient. Voilà les premiers résultats de vos succès. La France entière y applaudira!

(You have fought valiantly. You have shown once again what France can expect from your patriotism. The king of Annam has asked for an armistice, and the civil commissioner-general has gone to Huế to negotiate. In a few days you have given a new prestige to the name of France in the Far East. Here are the first fruits of your victories. All France will applaud them!)

== Pierre Loti and the battle of Thuận An ==
Enseigne de vaisseau Louis-Marie-Julien Viaud (1850–1923), who served in Courbet's Tonkin Coasts naval division aboard the ironclad Atalante, described his campaigning experiences in a number of popular articles published under the pen name Pierre Loti. He wrote a detailed account of the battle of Thuận An entitled Trois journées de guerre en Annam, which was published in three parts in Le Figaro on 28 September and 13 and 17 October 1883. Viaud's brutally realistic description of the fighting at Thuận An, his account of French atrocities (the bayoneting of wounded Vietnamese soldiers by French marine infantrymen after the battle) and the obvious pleasure the soldiers took in the slaughter of the outclassed Vietnamese, caused great offence in France, and he was recalled by the navy ministry and suspended from duty.

The great slaughter now began. Our men fired double volleys, and it was a pleasure to see their streams of well-aimed bullets shredding the enemy ranks, surely and methodically, twice a minute, on the word of command... We could see some men, quite out of their senses, standing up, seized with a dizzy desire to run... They zigzagged, swerving this way and that way as they tried to outrun death, clutching their garments around their waists in a comical way... Afterwards, we amused ourselves by counting the dead...

— Pierre Loti, Trois journées de guerre en Annam, extract.
