= Alma-class ironclad =

French class of Ironclad Corvettes

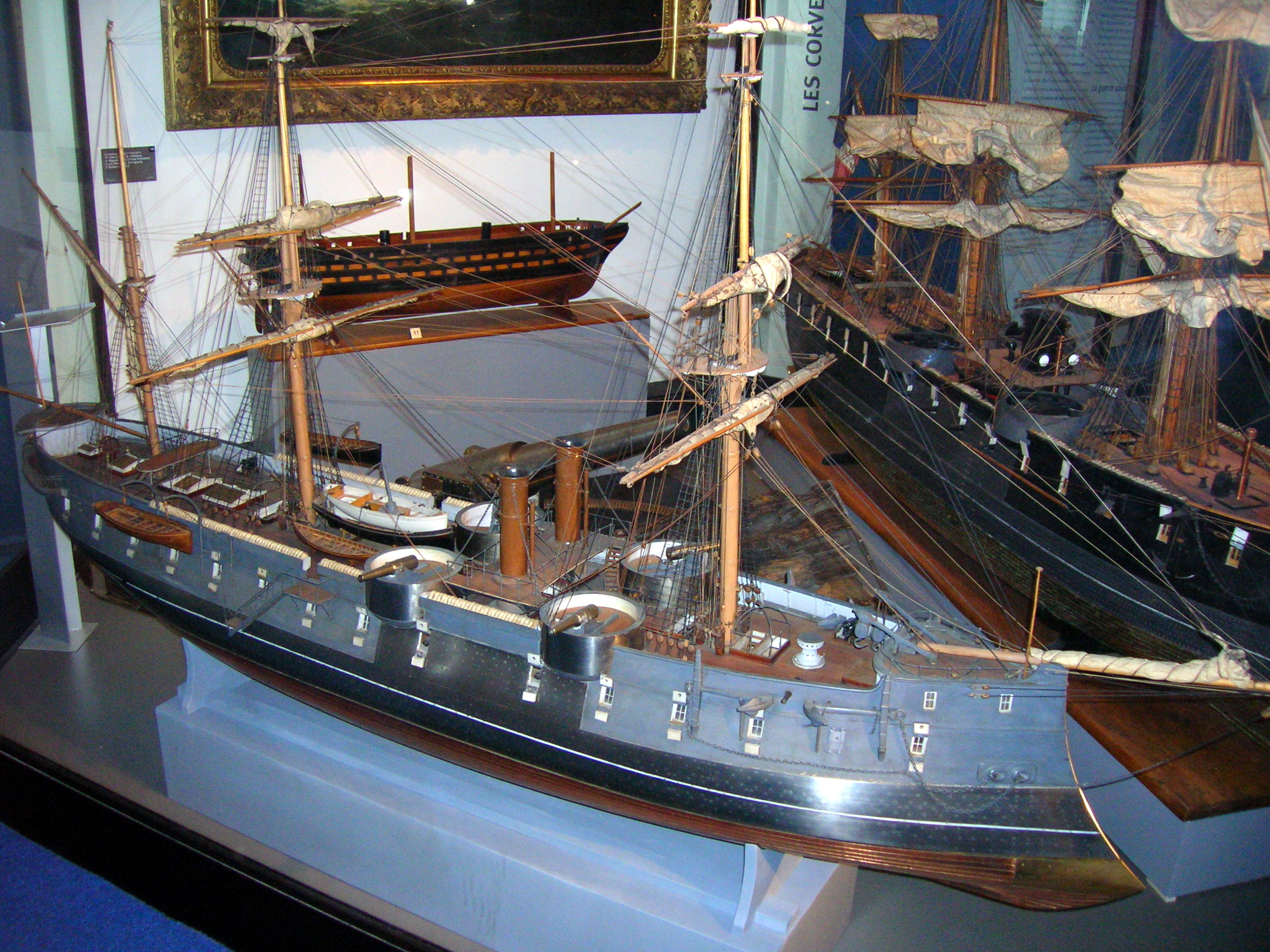
- Model of Jeanne d'Arc on display at the Musée de la Marine in Paris, before the rear barbettes were deleted

Class overview
- Name: Alma class
- Operators: French Navy
- Preceded by: Belliqueuse
- Succeeded by: La Galissonnière class
- Built: 1865–1870
- In service: 1867–1891
- Completed: 7
- Scrapped: 7

General characteristics
- Type: Ironclad corvette
- Displacement: 3,569–3,889 t (3,513–3,828 long tons)
- Length: 68.75–69.03 m (225 ft 7 in – 226 ft 6 in)
- Beam: 13.94–14.13 m (45 ft 9 in – 46 ft 4 in)
- Draft: 6.26–6.66 m (20 ft 6 in – 21 ft 10 in) (mean)
- Installed power: 4 boilers; 1,585–1,896 ihp (1,182–1,414 kW)
- Propulsion: 1 shaft, 1 steam engine
- Sail plan: Barque-rig
- Speed: 11 knots (20 km/h; 13 mph)
- Range: 1,310–1,620 nmi (2,430–3,000 km; 1,510–1,860 mi) at 10 knots (19 km/h; 12 mph)
- Complement: 316
- Armament: 6 × single 194 mm (7.6 in) Mle 1864 guns; 4 × single 120 mm (4.7 in) guns
- Armor: Belt: 150 mm (5.9 in); Battery: 120 mm (4.7 in); Barbettes: 100 mm (3.9 in); Bulkheads: 120 mm (4.7 in)

The Alma-class ironclads were a group of seven wooden-hulled, armored corvettes built for the French Navy in the mid to late 1860s. Three of the ships attempted to blockade Prussian ports in the Baltic Sea in 1870 during the Franco-Prussian War. Three others patrolled the North Sea and the Atlantic, while the last ship was en route to Japan when the war began and blockaded two small Prussian ships in a Japanese harbor. Afterwards they alternated periods of reserve and active commissions, many of them abroad. Three of the ships participated in the French occupation of Tunisia in 1881 while another helped to intimidate the Vietnamese Government into accepting status as a French protectorate and played a small role in the Sino-French War of 1884–85.

== Design and description ==
The Alma-class ironclads (Note: Ironclad is the all-encompassing term for armored warships of this period. Armored corvettes were originally designed for the same role as traditional wooden corvettes, but this rapidly changed as the size and expense of these ships caused them to be used as second-class armored ships.) were designed by Henri Dupuy de Lôme as improved versions of the armored corvette Belliqueuse suitable for foreign deployments. Unlike their predecessor the ships were true central battery ironclads as they were fitted with armored transverse bulkheads. The original plan for these ships was to have a two-deck battery with four 194-millimeter (7.6 in) guns on the battery deck and four 164-millimeter (6.5 in) guns mounted above them on the upper deck, one gun at each corner of the battery. This design was changed to substitute four barbettes for the upper battery, but the addition of armored bulkheads proved to be very heavy and the rear pair of barbettes had to be deleted to save weight. In partial compensation the 164-millimeter guns in the remaining forward barbettes were replaced by an additional pair of 194-millimeter guns. Like most ironclads of their era they were equipped with a metal-reinforced ram.

The ships were built from the same general plan, but differed amongst themselves. They measured 68.75–69.03 meters (225 ft 7 in – 226 ft 6 in) between perpendiculars, with a beam of 13.94–14.13 meters (45 ft 9 in – 46 ft 4 in). The ships had a mean draft of 6.26–6.66 meters (20 ft 6 in – 21 ft 10 in) and displaced 3,569–3,889 metric tons (3,513–3,828 long tons). Their crew numbered 316 officers and men.

=== Propulsion ===
The Alma-class ships had a single horizontal return connecting-rod steam engine driving a single propeller. Their engine was powered by four oval boilers. On sea trials the engine produced between 1,585–1,896 indicated horsepower (1,182–1,414 kW) and the ships reached 10.48–11.99 knots (19.41–22.21 km/h; 12.06–13.80 mph). Unlike the single funnels of the others, Jeanne d'Arc and Thétis had two funnels, mounted side by side. The ships carried 250 metric tons (250 long tons) of coal which allowed the ship to steam for 1,310–1,620 nautical miles (2,430–3,000 km; 1,510–1,860 mi) at a speed of 10 knots (19 km/h; 12 mph). They were barque-rigged with three masts and had a sail area between 1,338–1,454 square meters (14,400–15,650 sq ft).

=== Armament ===
The ships mounted four of their 194-millimeter Modèle 1864 breech-loading guns in the central battery on the battery deck. The other two 194-millimeter guns were mounted in barbettes on the upper deck, sponsoned out over the sides of the ship. The four 120-millimeter (4.7 in) guns were also mounted on the upper deck. Alma is the only ship positively known to have exchanged her 194 mm guns for newer Modèle 1870 guns. The armor-piercing shell of the 20-caliber Mle 1870 gun weighed 165.3 pounds (75 kg) while the gun itself weighed 7.83 long tons (7.96 t). The gun fired its shell at a muzzle velocity of 1,739 ft/s (530 m/s) and was credited with the ability to penetrate a nominal 12.5 inches (320 mm) of wrought iron armour at the muzzle. The guns could fire both solid shot and explosive shells.

=== Armor ===
The Alma-class ships had a complete 150-millimeter (5.9 in) wrought iron waterline belt, approximately 2.4 meters (7.9 ft) high. The sides of the battery itself were armored with 120 millimeters (4.7 in) of wrought iron and the ends of the battery were closed by bulkheads of the same thickness. The barbette armor was 100 millimeters (3.9 in) thick, backed by 240 millimeters (9.4 in) of wood. The unarmored portions of their sides were protected by 15-millimeter (0.6 in) iron plates.

== Ships ==
Construction data
Ship	Builder	Laid down	Launched	Commissioned	Fate
Alma	Lorient	1 October 1865	26 November 1867	1870	Sold, May 1893
Armide	Rochefort	1865	12 April 1867	1868	Used in gunnery trials, 1886
Atalante	Cherbourg Harbour	June 1865	9 April 1868	1869	Condemned, 1887 in Saigon
Jeanne d'Arc	Cherbourg	1865	28 September 1867	1869	Condemned, 28 August 1883
Montcalm	Rochefort	26 October 1865	16 October 1868	1869	Condemned, 2 April 1891
Reine Blanche	Lorient	1865	10 March 1868	1869	Condemned, 12 November 1884
Thétis	Toulon	1865	22 August 1867	1868	Hulked after 1885

== Service ==
During the Franco-Prussian War of 1870–71 Thétis, Jeanne d'Arc and Armide were assigned to the Northern Squadron that attempted to blockade Prussian ports on the Baltic until ordered to return to Cherbourg on 16 September 1870. Montcalm, Atalante, and Reine Blanche cruised the North Sea and Montcalm later captured the Prussian Barque Union and watched a Prussian corvette in Portuguese waters. Alma was en route to the Far East when the war began and she blockaded a pair of Prussian corvettes in Yokohama harbor once she arrived at Japan.

After the end of the war many of the ships were placed in reserve or sent to foreign stations, often as the flagship. During the Third Carlist War of 1872–76 Thétis, Reine Blanche and Jeanne d'Arc spent time in Spanish waters where they could protect French citizens and interests. In 1875, the latter ship rammed and sank the dispatch vessel Forfait. On 3 July 1877 Thétis rammed Reine Blanche who had to be run ashore to prevent her from sinking.

Further abroad Reine Blanche and Alma bombarded the Tunisian port of Sfax in July 1881 as part of the French occupation of Tunisia. Atalante participated in the Battle of Thuận An in August 1883. This was an attack by the French on the forts defending the mouth of the Perfume River, leading to the Vietnamese capital of Huế in an attempt to intimidate the Vietnamese government. During the Sino-French War of 1884–85 the ship was in Huế in early September 1884, but she carried Admiral Amédée Courbet to Keelung, Taiwan on 23 September.
