= French ironclad Alma =

French lead ship of Alma-class

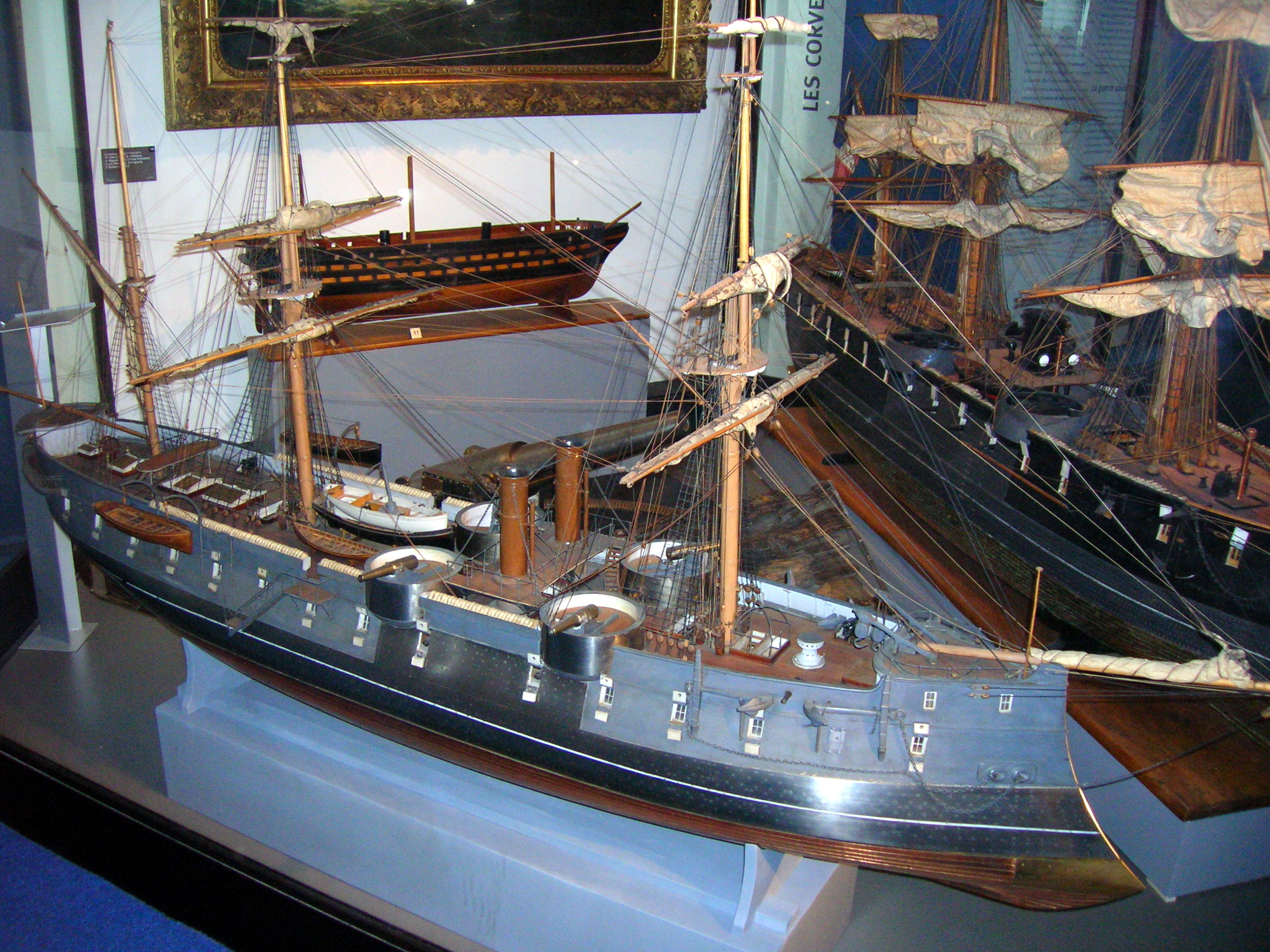
- Model of her sister ship Jeanne d'Arc on display at the Musée de la Marine in Paris, before the rear barbettes were deleted.

History

France
- Name: Alma
- Namesake: Battle of Alma
- Builder: Lorient
- Laid down: 1 October 1865
- Launched: 26 November 1867
- Commissioned: 1870
- Fate: Sold May 1893

General characteristics
- Class & type: Alma-class ironclad
- Displacement: 3,778 t (3,718 long tons)
- Length: 68.84 m (225 ft 10 in)
- Beam: 14.04 m (46 ft 1 in)
- Draft: 6.53 m (21 ft 5 in) (mean)
- Installed power: 4 boilers; 1,896 ihp (1,414 kW)
- Propulsion: 1 shaft, steam engine
- Sail plan: Barque-rig
- Speed: 11 knots (20 km/h; 13 mph)
- Range: 1,360 nmi (2,520 km; 1,570 mi) at 10 knots (19 km/h; 12 mph)
- Complement: 316
- Armament: 6 × single 194 mm (7.6 in) Mle 1864 guns; 4 × single 120 mm (4.7 in) guns
- Armor: Belt: 150 mm (5.9 in); Battery: 120 mm (4.7 in); Barbettes: 100 mm (3.9 in); Bulkheads: 120 mm (4.7 in)

The French ironclad Alma was a wooden-hulled armored corvette built for the French Navy in the late 1860s. The lead ship of her class, she was named after the 1854 Battle of Alma of the Crimean War. The ship spent her early career on the China Station and later supported the French occupation of Tunisia in 1881. She was condemned in 1886, but was not sold until 1893.

== Design and description ==
The Alma-class ironclads (Note: Ironclad is the all-encompassing term for armored warships of this period. Armored corvettes were originally designed for the same role as traditional wooden corvettes, but this rapidly changed as the size and expense of these ships caused them to be used as second-class armored ships.) were designed as improved versions of the armored corvette Belliqueuse suitable for foreign deployments. Unlike their predecessor the Alma-class ships were true central battery ironclads as they were fitted with armored transverse bulkheads. Like most ironclads of her era she was equipped with a metal-reinforced ram.

Alma measured 68.84 meters (225 ft 10 in) between perpendiculars, with a beam of 14.04 meters (46 ft 1 in). She had a mean draft of 6.53 meters (21 ft 5 in) and displaced 3,778 metric tons (3,718 long tons).

=== Propulsion ===
The ship had a single Mazeline horizontal return connecting-rod steam engine driving a single propeller. Her engine was powered by four oval boilers. On sea trials the engine produced 1,896 indicated horsepower (1,414 kW) and the ship reached 11.3 knots (20.9 km/h; 13.0 mph). Alma carried 250 metric tons (250 long tons) of coal which allowed the ship to steam for 1,360 nautical miles (2,520 km; 1,570 mi) at a speed of 10 knots (19 km/h; 12 mph). She was barque-rigged and had a sail area of 1,454 square meters (15,650 sq ft).

=== Armament ===
Alma mounted her four 194-millimeter (7.6 in) Modèle 1864 breech-loading guns in the central battery on the battery deck. The other two 194 mm guns were mounted in barbettes on the upper deck, sponsoned out over the sides of the ship. The four 120-millimeter (4.7 in) guns were also mounted on the upper deck. She later exchanged her 194 mm guns for newer Modèle 1870 guns. The armor-piercing shell of the 20-caliber Mle 1870 gun weighed 165.3 pounds (75 kg) while the gun itself weighed 7.83 long tons (7.96 t). The gun fired its shell at a muzzle velocity of 1,739 ft/s (530 m/s) and was credited with the ability to penetrate a nominal 12.5 inches (320 mm) of wrought iron armour at the muzzle. The guns could fire both solid shot and explosive shells.

=== Armor ===
Alma had a complete 150-millimeter (5.9 in) wrought iron waterline belt, approximately 2.4 meters (7.9 ft) high. The sides of the battery itself were armored with 120 millimeters (4.7 in) of wrought iron and the ends of the battery were closed by bulkheads of the same thickness. The barbette armor was 100 millimeters (3.9 in) thick, backed by 240 millimeters (9.4 in) of wood. The unarmored portions of her sides were protected by 15-millimeter (0.6 in) iron plates.

== Service ==
Alma was laid down at Lorient on 1 October 1865 and launched on 26 November 1867. The ship began her sea trials on 24 August 1869, but did not enter service until the following year, after sailing to Brest to have sheathing added to protect her armor. She was commissioned as the flagship of the China Squadron under command of Rear Admiral Dupré and the ship departed Brest on 15 June 1870. She grounded on a shoal in the Inland Sea on 15 July (Note: This would have been an amazingly fast passage to Japan for this time and the date could well be a typo.) and lost her false keel. After the start of the Franco-Prussian War Alma blockaded the Prussian corvettes Hertha and Medusa in the Japanese port of Yokohama from mid-December 1870 until the end of the war.

On 24 August 1871 Alma rode out a typhoon in Yokohama. In May 1872, she was in collision with the Swedish barque Siam at Wusong, China. Siam sank; Alma developed a severe leak and was beached. She was relieved by Belliqueuse on 1 August 1872 and reached Toulon on 16 January 1873. The ship was assigned to the Evolutionary Squadron on 8 October 1873. She was in reserve in Cherbourg from 1876 to 1881. Alma recommissioned on 1 March 1881 and was assigned to the Levant Squadron. From 6–16 July 1881 the ship bombarded the Tunisian port of Sfax as part of the French occupation of Tunisia. She was reduced to reserve in Cherbourg on 8 January 1883. The ship was condemned on 12 March 1886, but Alma was not sold until May 1893 for 129,000 francs.
