= French ironclad Belliqueuse =

Ironclad ship of the French Navy

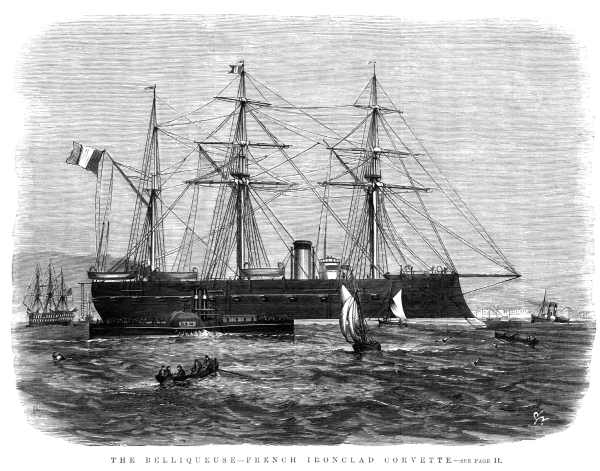
- Belliqueuse

Class overview
- Name: Belliqueuse class
- Operators: French Navy
- Preceded by: None
- Succeeded by: Alma class
- Built: 1863–1866
- In service: 1866–1918
- In commission: 1866–1884
- Completed: 1
- Retired: 1

History

France
- Name: Belliqueuse
- Builder: Toulon dockyard
- Laid down: September 1863
- Launched: 6 September 1865
- Commissioned: 30 October 1866
- Stricken: 3 May 1886
- Fate: Sold for demolition, 1889

General characteristics
- Type: Ironclad
- Displacement: 3,777 t (3,717 long tons)
- Length: 70 m (229 ft 8 in)
- Beam: 14.01 m (46 ft)
- Draft: 6.97 m (22.9 ft)
- Installed power: 4 oval boilers; 1,200 ihp (890 kW)
- Propulsion: 1 shaft, steam engine
- Sail plan: Barque-rig
- Speed: 11 knots (20 km/h; 13 mph)
- Range: 1,410 nautical miles (2,610 km; 1,620 mi) at 10 knots (19 km/h; 12 mph)
- Complement: 300
- Armament: 4 × single 194 mm (7.6 in) M 1864 guns; 6 × single 164.7 mm (6.5 in) M 1864 guns
- Armor: Belt: 150 mm (5.9 in); Battery: 120 mm (4.7 in)

The French ironclad Belliqueuse ("Bellicose") was a wooden-hulled, armored corvette, built for the French Navy in the 1860s and designed as a cheap ironclad. She was the first French ironclad to sail around the world, which she did between December 1867 and May 1869. She spent the bulk of her career in the Pacific before returning to Toulon, where she was used as a target in 1886.

== Design and description ==
Belliqueuse was designed as a small and cheap ironclad (Note: Ironclad is the all-encompassing term for armored warships of this period. Armored corvettes were originally designed for the same role as traditional wooden corvettes, but this rapidly changed as the size and expense of these ships caused them to be used as second-class armored ships.) suitable for foreign deployments. Her armament and armor was concentrated in the middle of the ship like a central battery ironclad, but unlike those ships she lacked armored transverse bulkheads and was very vulnerable to raking fire. Like most ironclads of her era she was equipped with a bronze ram; hers weighed 2,200 kilograms (4,900 lb).

Belliqueuse measured 68.05 meters (223 ft 3 in) at the waterline and 70 meters (229 ft 8 in) between perpendiculars, with a beam of 14.01 meters (46 ft). She had a draft of 6.97 meters (22 ft 10 in) and displaced 3,777 metric tons (3,717 long tons).

=== Propulsion ===
The ship had a single horizontal return connecting-rod steam engine driving a single propeller. Her engine was powered by four oval boilers. The engine produced a total of 1,200 indicated horsepower (890 kW) and gave a top speed of 11 knots (20 km/h; 13 mph). On sea trials the engine produced 1,227 indicated horsepower (915 kW) and the ship reached 11.83 knots (21.91 km/h; 13.61 mph). Belliqueuse carried 250 metric tons (250 long tons) of coal which allowed the ship to steam for 1,410 nautical miles (2,610 km; 1,620 mi) at a speed of 10 knots (19 km/h; 12 mph).

Belliqueuse was barque-rigged; initially she had a sail area of 1,450 square meters (15,600 sq ft), but this was later increased to 1,800 square metres (19,000 sq ft) in 1869.

=== Armament ===
Belliqueuse mounted her four Canon de 19 C modèle 1864 (194-millimeter (7.6 in)) guns in the central battery on the battery deck along with four of her six Canon de 16 C modèle 1864 164-millimeter (6.5 in) guns. The other two 164 mm guns were carried on pivot mounts fore and aft on the upper deck. She was partially rearmed in 1870 and exchanged her 164 mm pivot guns for a pair of 138-millimeter (5.4 in) Modèle 1870 guns. In addition four 37-millimeter (1.5 in) Hotchkiss 5-barrel revolving guns each were added. They fired a shell weighing about 500 g (1.1 lb) at a muzzle velocity of about 610 m/s (2,000 ft/s) to a range of about 3,200 meters (3,500 yd). They had a rate of fire of about 30 rounds per minute.

=== Armor ===
Belliqueuse was completely armored with 150 millimeters (5.9 in) of wrought iron from the battery deck down to 1.5 meters (4 ft 11 in) below the waterline. The sides of the battery itself were protected with 120 millimeters (4.7 in) of armor, but the ends were closed only by light screens. Fore and aft of the battery, her sides were unprotected.

== Service ==
Belliqueuse was laid down at Toulon in September 1863, and launched on 6 September 1865. The ship began her sea trials on 30 December 1865, but did not enter service until 30 October 1866. That day she was commissioned as the flagship of the Pacific Station under command of Contre-amiral (Rear Admiral) Jérôme-Hyacinthe Penhoat. On 22 December 1867, the ship departed Toulon in an attempt to circumnavigate the world. Belliqueuse arrived at Brest on 26 May 1869 after 396 days at sea, the first French ironclad to do so. On 15 November 1869 she hoisted the flag of Rear Admiral Chevalier as commander of the Levant Squadron. During 1870 she was transferred to New Caledonia as flagship of the Western Pacific Division (Division de l'Océanie Occidentale), but returned to Toulon on 5 June 1871 after Chevalier's death. In 1872 the ship was sent to the China Station and relieved the French ironclad Alma as flagship of the station on 1 October 1872. She returned to Toulon on 3 May 1874.

Belliqueuse served with the Squadron of Evolutions (Escadre d'évolution) for six months from 5 June 1877 and was reduced to reserve afterwards. She was paid off on 15 November 1884 and struck off the navy list on 3 May 1886. Belliqueuse was then used as a target in experiments with high capacity shells. (Note: Utilisée comme but de tir pour expérience d'obus à grand capacité.) Belliqueuse was sold at Toulon for demolition in 1889.
