= List of ship launches in 1867 =

The list of ship launches in 1867 is a chronological list of ships launched in 1867.

Date	Ship	Class	Builder	Location	Country	Notes
1 January	Cicero	Barque	William Doxford	Pallion	United Kingdom	For Messrs. John Tully & Son.
3 January	Eclipse	Steamship	Messrs. A. Hall & Co.	Aberdeen	United Kingdom	For private owner.
7 January	Crocodile	Euphrates-class troopship	Money Wigram and Sons	Blackwall Yard	United Kingdom	For Royal Navy.
8 January	Lady of Lyons	Fishing smack	John Dalton	Grimsby	United Kingdom	For W. Stephenson.
16 January	Friedrich Carl	Ironclad	Société Nouvelle des Forges et Chantiers de la Méditerranée	Toulon	France	For Prussian Navy.
22 January	Carnatic	Barque	W. Pile, Hay, & Co	Sunderland	United Kingdom	For Watts & Co.
22 January	Iron King	Full-rigged ship	Spittle	Newport	United Kingdom	For private owner.
23 January	Macedonia	Steamship	Messrs. Thomas Vernon & Son	Seacombe	United Kingdom	For Messrs. Papayanni Bros.
January	Ann Middleton	Brig	Messrs. Shepherd & Co.	Whitehaven	United Kingdom	For Thomas Middleton.
January	Cimbria	Steamship	Messrs Laird & Co.	Greenock	United Kingdom	For Hamburg America Line.
2 February	Memphis	Steamship	Messrs. C. & W. Earle	Hull	United Kingdom	For Messrs. W. H. Moss & Co.
6 February	Bruckley Castle	Clipper	Messrs. Alexander Hall & Co.	Footdee	United Kingdom	For Messrs. Donaldson, Rose & Co.
6 February	Zaragoza	Armored frigate	Arsenales de la Armarda	Cartagena	Spain	For Spanish Navy.
7 February	Arctic	Whaler	Messrs. Alexander Stephen & Sons	Dundee	United Kingdom	For private owner.
18 February	City of Glasgow	Steamship	Messrs. Barclay, Curle & Co.	Stobcross	United Kingdom	For Messrs. George Smith & Sons.
19 February	Two Ellens	Brigantine		Weymouth	(United Kingdom of Great Britain and Ireland) Colony of Nova Scotia	For private owner.
20 February	Austrian	Steamship	Messrs. Barclay, Curle & Co.	Greenock	United Kingdom	For Montreal Ocean Steamship Company.
20 February	Pampero	Clipper	John Smith	Aberdeen	United Kingdom	For John Cook.
20 February	Plover	Gunboat		Deptford Dockyard	United Kingdom	For Royal Navy.
21 February	Maggie	Schooner	John Watson	Banff	United Kingdom	For private owner.
24 February	Germania	Merchantman		Lübeck	Lübeck	For private owner.
26 February	Westward	Schooner	Messrs. Scott & M'Gill	Bowling	United Kingdom	For D. M'Arthur and others.
28 February	Contest	Schooner	Messrs. J. & R. Swan	Kelvindock	United Kingdom	For Messrs. Couper & Keith.
February	Coquette	Steamship		River Clyde	United Kingdom	For private owner.
February	Sarah Ann	Schooner	Mr. Barlow	Caernarfon	United Kingdom	For William Jones.
5 March	Agnes Rose	Clipper	Messrs. John Duthie, Sons, & Co.	Aberdeen	United Kingdom	For private owner
5 March	Royalist	Steamship	Messrs. Blackwood & Gordon	Port Glasgow	United Kingdom	For Rajah of Sarawak.
5 March	Supé	Steamship	Messrs. Randolph, Elder & Co.	Fairfield	United Kingdom	For Pacific Steam Navigation Company.
7 March	Alexander Duthie	Clipper	William Duthie Jr.	Aberdeen	United Kingdom	For private owner.
7 March	Ellen Lamb	Barque	Messrs. Dobie & Co	Govan	United Kingdom	For Messrs. Doward, Dickson & Co.
9 March	Cholula	Merchantman	Messrs. G. R. Clover & Co.	Birkenhead	United Kingdom	For Messrs. Willis & Co.
9 March	Great Western	Steamship	Messrs. William Simons & Co.	Renfrew	United Kingdom	For private owner.
9 March	Istrian	Cargo ship	Harland & Wolff	Belfast	United Kingdom	For J. Bibby & Sons.
11 March	Charlotte Maule	Schooner	Messrs. Donald, Steele & Co	Granton	United Kingdom	For Mr. Donald & Mr. Maule. Capsized soon after being launched.
12 March	Arica	Paddle steamer	Messrs. Randolph, Elder & Co.	Fairfield	United Kingdom	For Pacific Steam Navigation Company.
13 March	Cato	Steamship	London and Glasgow Engineering and Iron Shipbuilding Company (Limited)	Glasgow	United Kingdom	For Messrs. T. Wilson, Sons. & Co.
16 March	Prospero	Steamship	Messrs. C. & W. Earle	Hull	United Kingdom	For Messrs. Leetham Bros.
19 March	Sandringham	Brig	Robinson	Blyth	United Kingdom	For George D. Dale.
20 March	Dairymaid	Schooner	Simpson	Glasson Dock	United Kingdom	For private owner.
20 March	Mirzapore	Barque	William Watson	Sunderland	United Kingdom	For Baour et Cie.
20 March	Russia	Ocean liner	J. & G. Thomson	Glasgow	United Kingdom	For Cunard Line.
20 March	Weser	Steamship	Messrs. Caird & Co.	Greenock	United Kingdom	For Norddeutscher Lloyd.
21 March	Alpha	Steamship	C. Seager	Wellington	(United Kingdom of Great Britain and Ireland) New Zealand	For private owner.
21 March	County of Elgin	Merchantman	Messrs. Charles Connell & Co.	Overnewton	United Kingdom	For Messrs. R. & J. Craig.
21 March	Pacific	Barque	Messrs. Alexander Stephen & Sons	Kelvinhaugh	United Kingdom	For private owner.
25 March	Galvanic	Steamship	Messrs. Scott & Co.	Greenock	United Kingdom	For Belfast Steamship Co.
27 March	Tauranga	Steamship	Fraser & Tinne	Auckland	(United Kingdom of Great Britain and Ireland) New Zealand	For Bay of Plenty Steam Navigation Co.
30 March	Dunoon Castle	Paddle steamer	Messrs. Wingate	Whiteinch	United Kingdom	For Rothesay and Dunoon Carriers.
March	Bangalore	Steamship	Messrs. William Denny & Bros.	Dumbarton	United Kingdom	For Peninsular and Oriental Steam Navigation Company.
March	Cocopah II	Sternwheeler		Arizona City	(United States) Arizona Territory	For George A. Johnson & Company.
March	Dragon	Steamship	Messrs. Henderson, Coulborn & Co.	Renfrew	United Kingdom	For De Bussche.
1 April	Gulnare	Steamship	Messrs. Charles Connell & Co.	Overnewton	United Kingdom	For A. M'Leod, chartered by British Government.
1 April	John Wesley	Missionary ship	Messrs. A. Hall & Co.	Aberdeen	United Kingdom	For Wesleyan Missionary Society.
2 April	James W. Elwell	Schooner	John A. Forsyth	Mystic Bridge, Connecticut	United States	For New Jersey Pilots.
11 April	Skerryvore	Cutter	Messrs. Archibald M'Millan & Son	Dumbarton	United Kingdom	For Commissioners of Northern Light Houses.
16 April	Leicester	East Indiaman	Messrs. J. G. Laurie	Whiteinch	United Kingdom	For Merchant Shipping Company.
18 April	Quito	Steamship	Messrs. Randolph, Elder & Co	Fairfield	United Kingdom	For Pacific Steam Navigation Company.
20 April	Globe	Full-rigged ship	Bowdler, Chaffer & Co.	Seacombe	United Kingdom	For W. J. Myers & Sons.
20 April	Go Ahead	Steamship	Thomas B. Seath & Co.	Rutherglen	United Kingdom	For Clyde Shipping Co.
22 April	Athletæ	Schooner	William Wake	Goole	United Kingdom	For Mr. Cass and others.
24 April	Armide	Corvette		Rochefort	France	For French Navy.
24 April	Lake Leman	Merchantman	Messrs. William Simons & Co.	Renfrew	United Kingdom	For Messrs. J. & R. Young.
30 April	Sultan	Steamship	Messrs. C. & W. Earle	Hull	United Kingdom	For Messrs. Gee & Co.
April	City of Venice	Merchantman	Messrs. C. Connell & Co.	Kelvinhaugh, Glasgow	United Kingdom	For George Smith & Sons.
April	Elaine	Paddle steamer	Messrs. Robert Duncan & Co.	Port Glasgow	United Kingdom	For Graham Brymner.
April	Fleetwood	Full-rigged ship	Messrs. Robert Steele & Co.	Greenock	United Kingdom	For Messrs. James Richardson & Co.
April	Gallovidian	Barque	Messrs. Dobie & Co.	Govan	United Kingdom	For Messrs. Miners & Co.
April	Glenore	Dredger	Messrs. William Simons & Co.	Renfrew	United Kingdom	For Carlingford Lough Commissioners.
April	Humboldt	Full-rigged ship	Messrs. Alexander Stephen & Sons	Kelvinhaugh	United Kingdom	For Robert Miles Sloman.
April	Niobe	Steamship	Messrs. Richardson, Duck & Co.	Stockton-on-Tees	United Kingdom	For Messrs. Hornstedt & Garrthorne.
1 May	Balcarry	Barque	Messrs. Dobie & Co.	Govan	United Kingdom	For Messrs. D. & J. Sproat.
1 May	Uncle Ned	West Indiaman	E. Robertson	Ipswich	United Kingdom	For Messrs. Daniels, Brothers & Co.
2 May	Lochlomond	Paddle steamer	Messrs. Archibald Denny & Co.	Dumbarton	United Kingdom	For Peter Denny.
2 May	Normandy	Steamship	Messrs. Randolph, Elder & Co.	Fairfield	United Kingdom	For D. R. M'Gregor.
4 May	Leith	Steamship	Messrs. Blackwood & Gordon	Port Glasgow	United Kingdom	For Messrs. D. R. M'Gregor & Co., and Messrs. J. Miller & Co.
6 May	Banff	Schooner	Messrs. Stuart Bros.	Inverness	United Kingdom	Capsized and sank on launching, subsequently refloated.
6 May	Indiana	Steamship	John Horne	Waterford	United Kingdom	For Messrs. Malcolmson.
6 May	Kronprinz	Ironclad	Samuda Brothers	Cubitt Town	United Kingdom	For Prussian Navy.
7 May	Benvenue	Merchantman		River Clyde	United Kingdom	For Watson Bros.
7 May	Catherine Latham	Schooner	William Ashburner	Barrow-in-Furness	United Kingdom	For Thomas Ashburner.
7 May	Irvine	Barque	William Doxford	Sunderland	United Kingdom	For David Hunter.
7 May	Oimara	Cutter	Messrs. Robert Steele & Co.	Greenock	United Kingdom	For J. T. Tennant.
7 May	Trochrague	Merchantman	John M'Millan	Dumbarton	United Kingdom	For John Kerr.
8 May	Avon	Brig	Messrs. John Humphrey & Co.	Aberdeen	United Kingdom	For William Knox.
11 May	British Workman	Fishing smack	Messrs. John Wray & Sons	Burton Stather	United Kingdom	For William Lawrence.
18 May	Grecian	Steamship	Messrs. Robert Duncan & Co.	Port Glasgow	United Kingdom	For R. Little, and Messrs. Handyside & Henderson.
18 May	Thornhill	Brig	Gibbon & Nichol	Sunderland	United Kingdom	For Mr. Reay.
21 May	Danae	Eclipse-class sloop		Portsmouth Dockyard	United Kingdom	For Royal Navy.
21 May	Heather Bell	Schooner	Messrs. Camper & Nicholson	Gosport	United Kingdom	For private owner.
21 May	Pará	Pará-class monitor	Arsenal de Marinha da Côrte	Rio de Janeiro	Brazil	For Imperial Brazilian Navy.
22 May	Annie Falconer	Schooner			Unknown	For private owner.
25 May	Sappho	Yacht	C. & R. Poillon	Brooklyn, New York	United States	For William Proctor Douglas.
date	River Ganges	Barque	Kirkpatrick, M'Intyre & Co	Port Glasgow	United Kingdom	For Messrs. Hargrave, Ferguson & Co.
May	Kelpie	Steam yacht	Henderson, Coulborn & Co	Renfrew	United Kingdom	For private owner.
May	Rupert	Schooner	Hempstead Barnes	Gloucester	United Kingdom	For Thomas Gann Jr.
May	Sea Horse	Steam yacht	Messrs. Tod & MacGregor	Partick	United Kingdom	For Earl of Cardigan.
May	Sumatra	Steamship	Messrs. William Denny & Bros.	Dumbarton	United Kingdom	For Peninsular and Oriental Steam Navigation Company.
4 June	France	Steamship	Messrs. Thomas Royden & Sons	Liverpool	United Kingdom	For National Steamship Company.
4 June	Iberian	Cargo ship	Harland & Wolff	Belfast	United Kingdom	For J. Bibby & Sons.
4 June	Nyanza	Schooner	Messrs. Steele & Co.	Greenock	United Kingdom	For Earl of Wilton.
5 June	Fanny	lighter		Deptford Dockyard	United Kingdom	For Royal Navy.
5 June	Myrmidon	Cormorant-class gunvessel		Chatham Dockyard	United Kingdom	For Royal Navy.
5 June	Somersetshire	Steamship	Messrs. Wigram's	Blackwall	United Kingdom	For private owner.
5 June	Tiger	Paddle steamer	Bradley, Day & Co.	Liverpool	United Kingdom	For John Jones.
6 June	Canaradzo	Barque	W. Pile	Sunderland	United Kingdom	For John Hay.
11 June	Viatka	Steamship	Messrs. C. & W. Earle	Hull	United Kingdom	For C. M. Norwood.
13 June	Rivulet	Schooner	Bowdler, Chaffer & Co.	Seacombe	United Kingdom	For James Ferguson.
13 June	Sarah Jane	Schooner	Bowdler, Chaffer & Co.	Seacombe	United Kingdom	For W. Burnyeat & Co.
17 June	Elliots	Barque	W. Naizby	South Hylton	United Kingdom	For Messrs. John Short & Robert and Edward Milburn.
17 June	Otto	Steamship	Mesrs. C. & W. Earle	Hull	United Kingdom	For Messrs. Thomas Wilson, Sons, & Co.
18 June	Penelope	Central-battery ironclad	Nathaniel Barnaby	Pembroke Dockyard	United Kingdom	For Royal Navy.
19 June	Corsair	Steamship	Messrs. Henry Murray & Co.	Port Glasgow	United Kingdom	For John Macfarlane.
19 June	Pelican	Steamship	Messrs. Randolph, Elder & Co.	Fairfield	United Kingdom	For Ocean Fishery Co.
20 June	Carnarvon Castle	Clipper	Messrs. Barclay, Curle & Co.	Whiteinch	United Kingdom	For Castle Line.
20 June	Miami	Barque	Messrs. Dobie & Co.	Govan	United Kingdom	For Messrs. Donaldson Bros.
22 June	Bristol	Steamship	Bowdler, Chaffer & Co.	Seacombe	United Kingdom	For John Bacon.
23 June	Xantha	Steam yacht	Palmers Shipbuilding and Iron Company	Jarrow	United Kingdom	For Marquess of Anglesey.
24 June	Carrick Maid	Schooner	Messrs. D. & A. Fullarton	Ayr	United Kingdom	For John Graham.
June	Palermo	Steamship	Messrs. J. & R. Swan	Kelvindock	United Kingdom	For Messrs. Morries, Munro & Co.
June	Reichstag	Merchantman	Messrs. Alexander Stephen & Sons	Kelvinhaugh	United Kingdom	For Robert Miles Slomqan.
June	Rio Uruguay	Paddle steamer	Messrs. Caird & Co.	Greenock	United Kingdom	For David Bruce.
June	Rob Roy	Yawl		Limehouse	United Kingdom	For Mr. Macgregor.
June	Trojan	Steamship	Messrs. Robert Duncan & Co.	Port Glasgow	United Kingdom	For Messrs. Handyside & Henderson.
2 July	Siberia	Steamship	Messrs. Thompson	Govan	United Kingdom	For Messrs. Burns & MacIver, or Cunard Line.
3 July	Minnetonka	Java-class sloop-of-war		Portsmouth Navy Yard	United States	For United States Navy.
6 July	Lampo	Schooner	Bowdler, Chaffer & Co.	Seacombe	United Kingdom	For Woodhouse & Co.
6 July	South of Ireland	Paddle steamer	William Simons & Co.	Renfrew	United Kingdom	For Ford & Jackson.
8 July	Black Diamond	Collier	Harland & Wolff	Belfast	United Kingdom	For P. Evans & Co.
15 July	Ethiopian	Barque	J. & E. Lumsden	Pallion	United Kingdom	For Dove & Co.
18 July	Jaguarete	Steamship	Messrs. A. & J. Inglis	Pointhouse	United Kingdom	For Messrs. Isaac & Samuel.
18 July	Spindrift	Clipper	Messrs. Charles Connell & Co.	Overnewton	United Kingdom	For James Findlay.
20 July	Garrison	Steamship	Messrs. Aitken & Mansel	Whiteinch	United Kingdom	For William Laing.
20 July	Newport	Philomel-class gunvessel		Pembroke Dockyard	United Kingdom	For Royal Navy.
23 July	Lahloo	Tea clipper	Robert Steele & Co.	Greenock	United Kingdom	For James Findlay.
25 July	Brownlow	Steamship	Messrs. C. & W. Earle	Hull	United Kingdom	For Messrs. Brownlown, Lumsden & Co.
29 July	Conte Verde	Principe di Carignano-class ironclad	Cantiere navale fratelli Orlando	Livorno	Italy	For Regia Marina.
30 July	Clementina	Steamship	Messrs. Palmer's	Jarrow	United Kingdom	For Messrs Cerrutti & Co.
31 July	Parigro	Barque	Messrs. Steele & Co	Greenock	United Kingdom	For private owner.
July	Alice Fisher	Schooner	M'Lea	Rothesay	United Kingdom	For Joseph Fisher.
July	Beaver	Brigantine		Saguenay	(United Kingdom of Great Britain and Ireland) Canada	For private owner.
July	City of Delhi	Merchantman	Messrs. Barclay, Curle & Co.	Stobcross	United Kingdom	For George Smith & Sons.
July	Garrison	Steamhip	Messrs. Aitken & Mansel	Whiteinch	United Kingdom	For W. Laing and A. M. Davidson.
July	Geraint Loo	Clipper	A. M'Millan & Son	Dumbarton	United Kingdom	For John M'Cunn.
July	Hannah Simons	Steamship	Messrs. A. Stephen & Son	Kelvinhaugh	United Kingdom	For Benjamin Simons.
July	Italy	Barque	John Batchelor, or Batchelor Bros.	Cardiff	United Kingdom	For Thomass B. Batchelor.
July	James Aikin	East Indiaman	Messrs. John Reid & Co.	Port Glasgow	United Kingdom	For Messrs. M'Dairmaid, Greenshields & Co.
July	Jaquarete	Steamship	Messrs. A. & J. Inglis	Pointhouse	United Kingdom	For Messrs. Isaac & Samuel.
1 August	Europa	Steamship	Messrs. A. Stephen & Son	Kelvinhaugh	United Kingdom	For Messrs. Handyside & Henderson.
3 August	Baltimore	Steamship	Messrs. Caird & Co.	Greenock	United Kingdom	For Norddeutscher Lloyd.
3 August	Harlech Castle	Barque	Messrs. R. & J. Evans & Co.	Liverpool	United Kingdom	For John Roberts and others.
6 August	Mangosteen	Barque	W. Nicholson	Sunderland	United Kingdom	For William Nicholson & Sons.
7 August	Mira Flores	Barque	Bowdler, Chaffer & Co.	Seacombe	United Kingdom	For William Nicol.
9 August	Ossian	Steamship	Messrs. Thomas Wingate & Co.	Whiteinch	United Kingdom	For private owner.
13 August	Onyx	Steamship	Messrs. A. & J. Inglis	Pointhouse	United Kingdom	For Henry A. Hardy.
15 August	Bertha	Barque	William Watson	Sunderland	United Kingdom	For Goldberg & Co.
15 August	Grace Gibson	Merchantman	Messrs. Alexander Stephen & Sons	Kelvinhaugh	United Kingdom	For Henry W. Hewitt.
15 August	Lochnagar	Schooner	Messrs. Geddie	Banff	United Kingdom	For A. Watt and others.
15 August	L. R. H.	Barque	Reay & Naisby	Hylton	United Kingdom	For L. R. Hijos.
15 August	Nantasket	Gunboat		Boston Navy Yard	United States	For United States Navy.
16 August	Corsanegetto	Collier	Harland & Wolff	Belfast	United Kingdom	For M. A. Corsanego.
17 August	Beacon	Beacon-class gunvessel		Chatham Dockyard	United Kingdom	For Royal Navy.
17 August	Blanche	Eclipse-class sloop		Chatham Dockyard	United Kingdom	For Royal Navy.
17 August	Cordelia	Barque	Messrs. John Reid & Co.	Port Glasgow	United Kingdom	For Messrs. C. T. Bowring & Co.
17 August	Jumna	Full-rigged ship	William Pile	Sunderland	United Kingdom	For Nourse Line.
17 August	Lake Constance	Barque	Messrs. Kirkpatrick, M'Intyre & Co	Port Glasgow	United Kingdom	For Messrs. J. & R. Young & Co.
21 August	Rio Grande	Pará-class monitor	Arsenal de Marinha da Côrte	Rio de Janeiro	Brazil	For Imperial Brazilian Navy.
22 August	Thétis	Alma-class ironclad		Toulon	France	For French Navy.
29 August	Cambrian	Full-rigged ship	Messrs. Bowdler & Chaffer	Seacombe	United Kingdom	For John B. Walmsley & Co.
29 August	Dacca	Steamship	Messrs. A. & J. Inglis	Pointhouse	United Kingdom	For private owner.
29 August	River Hooghly	Barque	Messrs. Dobie & Co.	Govan	United Kingdom	For Messrs. Hargrove, Ferguson & Co.
30 August	Thyratira	Clipper	Messrs. Walter Hood & Co.	Aberdeen	United Kingdom	For Messrs. George Thompson Jr., & Co.
31 August	Bacchus	East Indiaman	Messrs. Clover & Co	Birkenhead	United Kingdom	For Messrs. G. H. Fletcher & Co.
31 August	Illyrian	Cargo ship	Harland & Wolff	Belfast	United Kingdom	For J. Bibby & Sons.
31 August	Jacare	Steamship	Messrs. A. & J. Inglis	Pointhouse	United Kingdom	For Messrs. J. Dalgish & Co.
31 August	Lizzie Scallan	Schooner	Michael Scallan	Ringsend	United Kingdom	For private owner.
31 August	May Flower	Paddle steamer	Bowdler, Chaffer & Co.	Seacombe	United Kingdom	For Thomas Butler.
31 August	Olaf Kyrra	Steamship	Messrs. C. Mitchell & Sons	Low Walker	United Kingdom	For Mandalsen Navigation Company.
31 August	Rostoff	Steamship	Messrs. C. Mitchell & Sons	Low Walker	United Kingdom	For Russian Steam Navigation Company.
31 August	Sunbeam	Pilot boat	Messrs. Thomas Royden & Sons	Liverpool	United Kingdom	For Bombay Pilots.
31 August	Zephyr	Pilot boat	Messrs. Thomas Royden & Sons	Liverpool	United Kingdom	For Bombay Pilots.
August	Carpo	Full-rigged ship		Saint John	(United Kingdom of Great Britain and Ireland) Canada	For private owner.
August	Danmark	Steamship	Messrs. Henderson, Coulborn & Co.	Renfrew	United Kingdom	For private owner.
August	Pasig	Steamship	Messrs. T. Wingate & Co.	Whiteinch	United Kingdom	For Messrs. Ker, Bolton & Co.
August	Precursor	Merchantman	Messrs. Joseph Birnie & Co.	Montrose	United Kingdom	For private owner.
August	Sarah	Schooner	John Broad	Newport	United Kingdom	For John Broad.
4 September	Ringdove	Plover-class gunvessel		Chatham Dockyard	United Kingdom	For Royal Navy.
11 September	Derwent	Barque	Messrs. Barclay, Curle & Co.	Whiteinch	United Kingdom	For W. H. Tindall.
12 September	Charodeika	Charodeika-class monitor	Admiralty Shipyard	Saint Petersburg	Russia	For Imperial Russian Navy.
12 September	Rusalka	Charodeika-class monitor	Admiralty Shipyard	Saint Petersburg	Russia	For Imperial Russian Navy.
14 September	Paraguaçu	Paddle steamer	London and Glasgow Engineering and Iron Shipbuilding Company	Glasgow	United Kingdom	For Bahia Steam Navigation Company.
14 September	Tchehatchoff	Steamship	Messrs. Charles Mitchell & Sons	Low Walker	United Kingdom	For Russian Steam Navigation Company.
16 September	Edith	Steamship	Messrs. Schlesinger, Davis & Co.	Wallsend	United Kingdom	For private owner.
18 September	Lancaster	Steamship	Bowdler, Chaffer & Co.	Seacombe	United Kingdom	For Wigan Coal & Iron Co.
19 September	Eclipse	Smack	Messrs. Stephen & Forbes	Peterhead	United Kingdom	For Mr. Mackie.
21 September	Admiral Lazarev	Admiral Lazarev-class monitor	New Admiralty Shipyard	Saint Petersburg	Russia	For Imperial Russian Navy.
26 September	Taraguy	Steamship	Messrs. Aitken & Mansel	Whiteinch	United Kingdom	For Parana Steam Navigation Company.
27 September	Blonde	Steamship	Messrs. Blackwood & Gordon	Port Glasgow	United Kingdom	For Messrs. Weatherley & Mead.
28 September	Jeanne d'Arc	Alma-class ironclad		Cherbourg	France	For French Navy.
28 September	Undine	Barque	W. Pile, Hay, & Co.	Sunderland	United Kingdom	For private owner.
September	Anne Main	Barque	Messrs. Alexander Stephen & Sons	Kelvinhaugh	United Kingdom	For Thomas Skinner.
September	Ardgowan	East Indiaman	Messrs. Robert Steele & Co.	Greenock	United Kingdom	For Messrs. Hamilton & Adam.
September	Black Prince	Paddle steamer	Messrs. Dobie & Co	Govan	United Kingdom	For Messrs. E. Griffiths, Bros., & Co.
September	Colonel Denfert	Schooner	Hempstead Barnes	Gloucester	United Kingdom	For private owner.
September	Commerce de Paysandu	Steamship	Messrs. A. & J. Inglis	Pointhouse	United Kingdom	For Messrs. Bates, Stokes & Co.
September	Cuyaba	Paddle steamer	Messrs. Robertson	Greenock	United Kingdom	For A. J. Dos Santos.
September	Greata	Steamship	Messrs. Barclay, Curle & Co.	Whiteinch	United Kingdom	For Carron Iron Co.
September	Helen Burns	Merchantman	Messrs. Robert Duncan & Co.	Port Glasgow	United Kingdom	For Albion Shipping Co.
September	Islay	Paddle steamer	Messrs. Barclay, Curle & Co.	Stobcross	United Kingdom	For Charles Morrison and others.
September	Lady of the Lake	Steamship		Lake Magog	(United Kingdom of Great Britain and Ireland) Canada	For private owner.
September	Leander	Clipper	J. G. Lawrie	Glasgow	United Kingdom	For Joseph Somer.
September	Leander	Schooner	M'Lea	Rothesay	United Kingdom	For Thomas M'Caig.
September	Medora	Merchantman	Messrs. Barr & Shearer	Ardrossan	United Kingdom	For Messrs. J. & A. Allen.
September	Silver River	Steamship	Messrs. Seatn & Connell	Rutherglen	United Kingdom	For private owner.
September	Vine	Steamship	Messrs. Randolph, Elder & Co.	Govan	United Kingdom	For D. R. M'Gregor.
1 October	Berlin	Steamship	Messrs. Caird & Co.	Greenock	United Kingdom	For Norddeutscher Lloyd.
2 October	Avon	Beacon-class gunvessel		Portsmouth Dockyard	United Kingdom	For Royal Navy.
2 October	Tigre	Steamship	Messrs. R. Duncan & Co.	Port Glasgow	United Kingdom	For private owner.
9 October	Voltaic	Steamship	Messrs. Macnab & Co	Greenock	United Kingdom	For Belfast Steam Shipping Company.
10 October	Annie	Schooner	F. Robertson	Peterhead	United Kingdom	For Buchan Commercial Co.
12 October	Ancon	Paddle steamer		Hunter's Point, California	United States	For Pacific Mail Steamship Company.
12 October	Goya	Steamship	Messrs. Aitken & Mansel	Govan	United Kingdom	For Parana Steam Navigation Company.
17 October	Forward Ho	Chinaman	Messrs. Alexander Stephen & Sons	Kelvinhaugh	United Kingdom	For Messrs. Robert Catto & Son.
17 October	Jane Miller	Schooner	Robert Johnston	Carrickfergus	United Kingdom	For Messrs. Millen & Co.
18 October	Atlas	Steamship	Messrs. Donald & Macfarlane	Paisley	United Kingdom	For John M'Donald.
28 October	Poonah	Merchantman	William Pile	Sunderland	United Kingdom	For Messrs. Tyser & Haviside.
29 October	Alagoas	Pará-class monitor	Arsenal de Marinha da Côrte	Rio de Janeiro	Empire of Brazil	For Imperial Brazilian Navy.
29 October	Imuncina	Barque	Messrs. Dobie & Co.	Govan	United Kingdom	For Messrs. Donaldson Bros.
30 October	Admiral Greig	Admiral Lazarev-class monitor	New Admiralty Shipyard	Saint Petersburg	Russia	For Imperial Russian Navy.
30 October	Colorado	Steamship	Messrs. Palmer & Co. (Limited)	Jarrow	United Kingdom	For National Steam Navigation Company.
30 October	Philomel	Plover-class gunvessel		Deptford Dockyard	United Kingdom	For Royal Navy.
31 October	Nyanza	Steamship	London and Glasgow Engineering and Iron Shipbuilding Company	Glasgow	United Kingdom	For Messrs. J. A. Dunkerley & Co.
October	Barbadian	Merchantman	A. M'Millan & Son	Dumbarton	United Kingdom	For John Kerr.
October	Comerçio de Paysandre	Steamship	Messrs. A. & J. Inglis	Pointhouse	United Kingdom	For Messrs. Bates, Stokes & Co.
October	Diamond	Steamship	Messrs. J. & R. Swan	Kelvindock	United Kingdom	For W. Robinson.
October	Douro	Brig	Messrs. Robert Steele & Co.	Greenock	United Kingdom	For Walter Grieve.
Unknown date	Energy	Thames barge	Thomas Bevan	Northfleet	United Kingdom	For John Messer Knight and Thomas Bevan.
October	Estrella de Chile	Barque	Laurence Hill & Co.	Port Glasgow	United Kingdom	For Glen Line.
October	Kinfauns Castle	East Indiaman	Messrs. C. Connell & Co.	Kelvinhaugh	United Kingdom	For Glasgow and Asiatic Shipping Company.
October	Imperial	Schooner	Mr. Bishton	Chester	United Kingdom	For James Davison.
October	Valdivia	Schooner	Bowdler, Chaffer & Co.	Seacombe	United Kingdom	For R. P. Brownell.
8 November	Lapwing	Plover-class gunvessel	Alexander Moore	Devonport Dockyard	United Kingdom	For Royal Navy.
8 November	São Paulo	Paddle steamer	Messrs. Wingate & Co.	Whiteinch	United Kingdom	For Messrs. John Proudfoot & Co.
14 November	Eclipse	Eclipse-class sloop		Sheerness Dockyard	United Kingdom	For Royal Navy.
14 November	Limari	Barque	Messrs. Alexander Stephen & Sons	Kelvinhaugh	United Kingdom	For Thomas Connell and others.
15 November	Yacht	Schooner	John Rodgerson	South Hylton	United Kingdom	For Joseph Nicholls.
24 November	Deux Maries	Brig	E. Spowers, or Spowers & Co	Hylton	United Kingdom	For R. Ringnez.
24 November	Severn	Barque	James Crown	Southwick	United Kingdom	For Robert H. Gayner.
25 November	Irene	Paddle steamer	Messrs. Caird & Co.	Greenock	United Kingdom	For Trinity House.
26 November	Alma	Alma-class ironclad		Lorient	France	For French Navy.
26 November	Eleanor	Brig	Messrs. Nichol & Gibbon	Hylton	United Kingdom	For W. & T. Bennett.
27 November	Cracker	Beacon-class gunvessel	R. J. Reed	Portsmouth Dockyard	United Kingdom	For Royal Navy.
27 November	Mullingar	Paddle steamer	Messrs. Walpole, Webb & Bewdley	Dublin	United Kingdom	For City of Dublin Steam Packet Company.
28 November	Ploughman	Brig	Messrs. Walter Hood & Co.	Aberdeen	United Kingdom	For Aberdeen Commercial Co.
29 November	Dwarf	Beacon-class gunvessel		Deptford Dockyard	United Kingdom	For Royal Navy.
29 November	Juno	Juno-class corvette		Chatham Dockyard	United Kingdom	For Royal Navy.
November	Anita	Steamship	Messrs. L. Hill & Co	Port Glasgow	United Kingdom	For London and River Plate Bank.
November	Ceres	Steamship	Messrs. William Denny & Bros.	Dumbrton	United Kingdom	For Österreichische Lloyd.
November	Francisco	Steamship	Messrs. Donald & M'Farlane	Paisley	United Kingdom	For private owner.
November	Jubilee	Steamship	T. R. Oswald	Pallion	United Kingdom	For Messrs. Lambert, Son, & Scott.
November	Jungfrau	Barque	William Doxford	Sunderland	United Kingdom	For Glover Bros.
November	Martha	Fishing smack	Alfred Simey	Sunderland	United Kingdom	For private owner.
November	Valetta	Steamship	T. R. Oswald	Sunderland	United Kingdom	For Oswald & Co.
9 December	Fido	Steamship	Messrs. Earle & Co.	Hull	United Kingdom	For Messrs. Wilson, Sons & Co.
10 December	Rona	West Indiaman	Messrs. Alexander Stephen & Sons	Kelvinhaugh	United Kingdom	For Messrs. Sandback, Tinne & Co.
13 December	Janette	Schooner	Messrs. Alexander Stephen & Sons	Kelvinhaugh	United Kingdom	For Messrs. William Couper & Co.
13 December	Margaret Mitchell	Schooner	M'Lay	Rothesay	United Kingdom	For Mr. Mitchell.
16 December	Edith	Schooner	Messrs. J. & A. Lambert	Ipswich	United Kingdom	For private owner.
20 December	Flirt	Beacon-class gunvessel		Devonport Dockyard	United Kingdom	For Royal Navy.
20 December	Fly	Beacon-class gunvessel		Devonport Dockyard	United Kingdom	For Royal Navy.
22 December	Severn	Sloop-of-war		New York Navy Yard	United States	For United States Navy.
23 December	Helgoland	Corvette			Austrian Empire	For Austrian Navy.
24 December	Rob Roy	Steamship	Messrs. Thomas Wingate & Co.	Whiteinch	United Kingdom	For Messrs. Robinson & Lilly.
28 December	Jane Davie	Merchantman	Messrs. Robert Duncan & Co.	Port Glasgow	United Kingdom	For Messrs. P. Henderson & Co.
28 December	Kestrel	Smack	George Parkinson	Hull	United Kingdom	For private owner.
28 December	Vasilefs Georgios	Corvette	Thames Iron Works, Shipbuilding and Engineering, and Dry Dock Company (Limited)	Blackwall	United Kingdom	For Royal Hellenic Navy.
December	Lady Alice Kenlis	Steamship		River Clyde	United Kingdom	For Messrs. Andrews & Co.
December	Pedro Gama	Steamship	Messrs. H. Murray & Co.	Port Glasgow	United Kingdom	For Messrs. M'Lean & Hope.
Summer	Modesty	Full-rigged ship	G. T. Pemberton	Quebec	(United Kingdom of Great Britain and Ireland) Canada	For private owner.
Unknown date	Abeona	Merchantman	B. Hodgson	Sunderland	United Kingdom	For Humble & Co.
Unknown date	Abeona	Barque			United Kingdom	For private owner.
Unknown date	Aber	Paddle steamer	W. Nicholson	Sunderland	United Kingdom	For Nicholson & Sons.
Unknown date	Active	Active-class schooner	J. W. Lynn	Philadelphia, Pennsylvania	United States	For United States Revenue Cutter Service.
Unknown date	Advena	Merchantman	Rawson & Watson	Sunderland	United Kingdom	For T. Gallon.
Unknown date	Aline	Merchantman	James Hardie	Sunderland	United Kingdom	For Ord & Co.
Unknown date	Altair	Merchantman	Iliff	Sunderland	United Kingdom	For R. Penney.
Unknown date	Altair	Schooner	Iliff & Mounsey	Sunderland	United Kingdom	For Preston & Co.
Unknown date	Annie	Barquentine	William Bonker	Salcombe	United Kingdom	For Richard H. Sladen and others.
Unknown date	Arbutus	Merchantman	J. Davison	Sunderland	United Kingdom	For T. White.
Unknown date	Ardent	Merchantman	G. Bartram	Sunderland	United Kingdom	For Westoll & Co.
Unknown date	Argosy	Merchantman	J. Gill	Sunderland	United Kingdom	For T. F. Gates.
Unknown date	Anastasia & Eleni	Merchantman	Liddell & Sutcliffe	Sunderland	United Kingdom	For M. Cumpas.
Unknown date	Auburn	Merchantman	G. Bartram	Sunderland	United Kingdom	For Holmes & Co.
Unknown date	Auchencairn	Merchantman	W. Richardson	Sunderland	United Kingdom	For Eccles & Co.
Unknown date	Azalea	Merchantman	James Robinson	Sunderland	United Kingdom	For Robinson & Co.
Unknown date	Barataria	Survey ship			United States	For United States Coast Survey.
Unknown date	Bells	Merchantman	W. Naizby	Sunderland	United Kingdom	For R. Bell.
Unknown date	Belted Will	Merchantman	T. Metcalf	Sunderland	United Kingdom	For G. Watson.
Unknown date	Brisk	Fishing trawler	Edward Aldous	Brightlingsea	United Kingdom	For John Ames.
Unknown date	Brothers and Sisters	Keelboat		Sunderland	United Kingdom	For private owner.
Unknown date	Bussorah	Barque	W. Adamson	Sunderland	United Kingdom	For W. Adamson.
Unknown date	Carron	Barque	James Crown	Sunderland	United Kingdom	For Watts & Co.
Unknown date	Chehalis	Paddle steamer	H. H. Hyde	Tumwater	(United States) Washington Territory	For private owner.
Unknown date	Clarissa	Brig	L. Wheatley	Sunderland	United Kingdom	For J. Patterson.
Unknown date	Clematis	Merchantman	W. H. Pearson	Sunderland	United Kingdom	For James Ayre.
Unknown date	Coldstream	Merchantman	J. Barken	Sunderland	United Kingdom	For J. Morrison.
Unknown date	Colombo	Merchantman	Sykes & Co	Sunderland	United Kingdom	For Dawson Bros.
Unknown date	Contest	Barque	Blumer & Co.	Sunderland	United Kingdom	For Ritson & Co.
Unknown date	Copenhagen	Paddle steamer	Messrs. Lobnitz, Coulborn & Co.	Renfrew	United Kingdom	For private owner.
Unknown date	Cyprus	Merchantman	George Barker	Sunderland	United Kingdom	For Chatt & Co.
Unknown date	Cyrene	Barque	W. Naizby	Sunderland	United Kingdom	For Foreman & Co.
Unknown date	Doggerbank	Fishing vessel			United Kingdom	For private owner. Converted to steam power as a salvage vessel in 1868.
Unknown date	Duesbery	Barque	John Robinson	Sunderland	United Kingdom	For Charles Brightman.
Unknown date	Duke	Barque	Thomas Metcalf	Sunderland	United Kingdom	For W. Davison.
Unknown date	Duncan	Lifeboat	Forrest & Son	Limehouse	United Kingdom	For Royal National Lifeboat Institution.
Unknown date	Earl of Dublin	Steamship	Messrs. Robert Duncan & Co.	Port Glasgow	United Kingdom	For Messrs. Lewis Potter & Co.
Unknown date	Ella Moore	Barque		Halls Harbour, Nova Scotia	(United Kingdom of Great Britain and Ireland) Canada	For D. B. & C. F. Eaton.
Unknown date	Elleray	Merchantman	W. Richardson	Sunderland	United Kingdom	For Glaholm & Co.
Unknown date	Emily	Merchantman	Rawson & Watson	Sunderland	United Kingdom	For Vonn Ronn & Co.
Unknown date	Emily Anne	Merchantman	G. & J. Mills	Sunderland	United Kingdom	For T. Randell.
Unknown date	Emperor	Steamship	Messrs. Charles Mitchell & Co.	Low Walker	United Kingdom	For British Government.
Unknown date	Emulation	Barque	Robert Thompson Jr.	Sunderland	United Kingdom	For Blain & Co.
Unknown date	Espiegle	Merchantman	Blumer & Co	Sunderland	United Kingdom	For H. Ellis.
Unknown date	Eugenie	Gunboat		London	United Kingdom	For unknown owner.
Unknown date	Fairway	Merchantman	James Hardie	Sunderland	United Kingdom	For Tullock & Co.
Unknown date	Flamborough	Merchantman	T. R. Oswald	Sunderland	United Kingdom	For James Livesay.
Unknown date	Fleetly	Merchantman	Coxon & Young	Sunderland	United Kingdom	For W. Charlton.
Unknown date	Fleetwing	Schooner	Henry B. Burger Sr.	Manitowoc, Wisconsin	United States	For private owner.
Unknown date	Fleetwing	Barque	W. H. Pearson	Sunderland	United Kingdom	For White & Co.
Unknown date	Flodden	Barque	W. Pickersgill	Sunderland	United Kingdom	For A. Watts.
Unknown date	Florence	Schooner	Dennison J. Lawlor	East Boston, Massachusetts	United States	For E. Bruce and William C. Fowler.
Unknown date	Florence	Merchantman	J. Gill	Sunderland	United Kingdom	For W. Tulloch.
Unknown date	Forest Grove	Barque	W. H. Pearson	Sunderland	United Kingdom	For R. Wynn.
Unknown date	Forfarshire	Barque	J. Morison	Sunderland	United Kingdom	For John Morison.
Unknown date	Garmer	River monitor	Motala Verkstad	Norrköping	Sweden	For Royal Swedish Navy.
Unknown date	Gael	Paddle steamer	Messrs. Robertson & Co.	Cartsdyke	United Kingdom	For Campbeltown Steamboat Company.
Unknown date	George Herbert	Merchantman	Raswon & Watson	Sunderland	United Kingdom	For J. Graham.
Unknown date	George Peabody	Schooner		Boston, Massachusetts	United States	For Samuel Henry Burtis.
Unknown date	Glen Osmond	Barque	James Laing	Sunderland	United Kingdom	For W. Stevens.
Unknown date	Golconda	Merchantman	G. Short	Sunderland	United Kingdom	For W. C. Allen.
Unknown date	Hanover	Barque	Thomas Bilbe & Co.	Rotherhithe	United Kingdom	For Anderson, Thomson & Co.
Unknown date	Harmodius	Merchantman	W. Pile	Sunderland	United Kingdom	For Mr. Walker.
Unknown date	Harraton	Merchantman	James Laing	Sunderland	United Kingdom	For H. Morton.
Unknown date	Hay's	Brig	Robert Potts	Seaham	United Kingdom	For W. Hay.
Unknown date	Helpmeet	Merchantman	J. Douglas	Sunderland	United Kingdom	For T. Knight.
Unknown date	Hopeful	Brig	J. & J. Gibbon	Sunderland	United Kingdom	For Gooding & Co.
Unknown date	Ida	Fishing lugger		Castletown	Isle of Man	For private owner.
Unknown date	Industry	Merchantman	J. Hardie	Sunderland	United Kingdom	For W. Ord & Co.
Unknown date	Inez	Merchantman	J. Hardie	Sunderland	United Kingdom	For W. Ord & Co.
Unknown date	Invicta	Barque	Iliff, Mounsey & Co.	Sunderland	United Kingdom	For Mears & Co, or Mear & Foreman.
Unknown date	Ionian	Merchantman	G. & J. Mills	Sunderland	United Kingdom	For Mr. Wrightson.
Unknown date	Istapa	Merchantman	James Hardie	Sunderland	United Kingdom	For Mr. Nichol.
Unknown date	Jane and Dorothy	Barque	John Thompson	Sunderland	United Kingdom	For W. & J. Brown.
Unknown date	John and Alice	Yorkshire Billyboy	Atkinson & Thompson	Knottingley	United Kingdom	For John & William Kilner.
Unknown date	John Byers	Merchantman	Robert Thompson & Sons	Sunderland	United Kingdom	For M. Robson.
Unknown date	Jumna	Merchantman	W. Pile, Hay, & Co.	Sunderland	United Kingdom	For J. Nourse.
Unknown date	Kingdom of Italy	Barque	G. Short	Sunderland	United Kingdom	For Gosman & Co.
Unknown date	Laura Williamson	Merchantman	William Pickersgill	Sunderland	United Kingdom	For T. Williamson.
Unknown date	Lebanon	Merchantman	James Robinson	Sunderland	United Kingdom	For M'Innes & Co.
Unknown date	Lion	Steamship	Walter Grieve & Co	Greenspond	Dominion of Newfoundland	
Unknown date	Loadstar	Yawl	Edward Aldous	Brightlingsea	United Kingdom	For Charles F. Allison.
Unknown date	Lochleven's Flower	Barque	T. Metcalf	Sunderland	United Kingdom	For Watson & Co.
Unknown date	Loochoo	Barque	W. Adamson	Sunderland	United Kingdom	For W. Adamson.
Unknown date	Luca	Merchantman	W. Barklay	Sunderland	United Kingdom	For M. Miceli.
Unknown date	Lydia Varwell	Schooner	John Barter	Brixham	United Kingdom	For William Varwell and others.
Unknown date	Lyra	Merchantman	Iliff	Sunderland	United Kingdom	For Penney & Co.
Unknown date	Madeline Ann	Merchantman	W. Barclay	Sunderland	United Kingdom	For Robertson Bros.
Unknown date	Manistee	Steamship	E. M. Peck Shipbuilders	Cleveland, Ohio	United States	For Engelman Line.
Unknown date	Marguerite	Merchantman	R. Pace	Sunderland	United Kingdom	For Rousanne et Cie.
Unknown date	Marion	Merchantman	Liddle & Sutcliffe	Sunderland	United Kingdom	For Shears & Co.
Unknown date	May Flower	Merchantman	William Pickersgill	Sunderland	United Kingdom	For G. Lawson.
Unknown date	Meggie	Merchantman	Sykes & Co	Sunderland	United Kingdom	For J. Gibbon.
Unknown date	Midsummer	Merchantman	J. Lister	Sunderland	United Kingdom	For J. Lister.
Unknown date	Minnie Gray	Merchantman	J. Robinson	Sunderland	United Kingdom	For Stead & Co.
Unknown date	Minora	Merchantman	Gray & Young	Sunderland	United Kingdom	For R. Coxon.
Unknown date	Mysterious Star	Merchantman	J. Barkes	Sunderland	United Kingdom	For Barkes & Co.
Unknown date	Nantib	Merchantman	W. Barclay	Sunderland	United Kingdom	For Stamp & Co.
Unknown date	Nebraska	Steamship		River Tyne	United Kingdom	For private owner.
Unknown date	Nina	Fishing lugger		Castletown	Isle of Man	For private owner.
Unknown date	Northumbria	Merchantman	James Robinson	Sunderland	United Kingdom	For T. Gibson.
Unknown date	Ocean	Barque	John Thompson	Sunderland	United Kingdom	For Forrest Bros.
Unknown date	Ocean Rover	Barque	Robert Thompson Jr.	Sunderland	United Kingdom	For Thompson & Co.
Unknown date	Oran	Merchantman	James Laing	Sunderland	United Kingdom	For Compagnie Anonyme de Navigation Mixte.
Unknown date	Palestine	Merchantman	J. Lister	Sunderland	United Kingdom	For W. Clough.
Unknown date	Payta	Merchantman	T. R. Oswald	Sunderland	United Kingdom	For Turner & Co.
Unknown date	Pennine	Barque	Peter Austin	Sunderland	United Kingdom	For W. Johnson.
Unknown date	Phantom	Schooner	Dennison J. Lawlor	Boston, Massachusetts	United States	For R. Yates and John Handran.
Unknown date	Plover	Merchantman	W. Pile	Sunderland	United Kingdom	For J. & T. Park.
Unknown date	Pyrrha	Barque	Iliff & Mounsey	Sunderland	United Kingdom	For Smith & Co.
Unknown date	Queen of Devon	Merchantman	Peter Austin	Sunderland	United Kingdom	For H. Ellis.
Unknown date	Queen of the Bay	Paddle steamer	Messrs. Henderson, Coulborn & Co.	Renfrew	United Kingdom	For Blackpool, Lytham and Southport Steam Packet Company.
Unknown date	Queen of the West	Merchantman	W. Pile, Hay, & Co	Sunderland	United Kingdom	For H. Ellis.
Unknown date	Red Rose	Fishing smack	Mr. Beeching	Wells-next-the-Sea	United Kingdom	For John Smyth.
Unknown date	Relief	Relief-class schooner	Bierly & Hillman	Philadelphia, Pennsylvania	United Kingdom	For United States Revenue Cutter Service.
Unknown date	Resolute	Active-class schooner	J. W. Lynn	Philadelphia, Pennsylvania	United States	For United States Revenue Cutter Service.
Unknown date	Resolution	Merchantman	T. W. Scarf	Sunderland	United Kingdom	For J. Charlton.
Unknown date	Ribston	Barque	J. Robinson	Sunderland	United Kingdom	For Brown & Co.
Unknown date	Rothbury	Merchantman	B. Hodgson	Sunderland	United Kingdom	For Pape & Co.
Unknown date	Russell	Merchantman	J. Davison	Sunderland	United Kingdom	For W. Atkinson.
Unknown date	Salacia	Brig	W. H. Pearson	Sunderland	United Kingdom	For W. Sinclair.
Unknown date	San Antonio	Merchantman	James Hardie	Sunderland	United Kingdom	For W. Nichol.
Unknown date	Secret Shot	Brigantine	W. Adamson	Sunderland	United Kingdom	For private owner.
Unknown date	Selma	Barque	Robert Thompson & Sons	Sunderland	United Kingdom	For Mark Thompson.
Unknown date	Severn	Merchantman	T. R. Oswald	Sunderland	United Kingdom	For Good & Co.
Unknown date	Shooting Star	Merchantman	G. Short	Sunderland	United Kingdom	For H. Ellis & Co.
Unknown date	Star	Barque	Walker & Carr	Sunderland	United Kingdom	For Irvine & Co.
Unknown date	Star of Hope	Barque	George Barker	Sunderland	United Kingdom	For Potts & Co.
Unknown date	Staunch	Gunboat	Sir W. G. Armstrong & Co., and Charles Mitchell & Co.	Newcastle upon Tyne	United Kingdom	For Royal Navy.
Unknown date	Sweepstakes	Schooner	Melancthon Simpson	Burlington, Ontario	(United Kingdom of Great Britain and Ireland) Canada	For private owner.
Unknown date	T. B. Ord	Barque	G. & J. Mills	Sunderland	United Kingdom	For F. Ritson.
Unknown date	Thomas Knox	Barque	Richard Thompson	Sunderland	United Kingdom	For T. Knox.
Unknown date	Tortola	Barque	J. Davison	Sunderland	United Kingdom	For Anderson & Co.
Unknown date	Ulva	Barque		Overnewton	United Kingdom	For James Kelso.
Unknown date	Unison	Barque	Reay & Naisby	Sunderland	United Kingdom	For William Farrow Jr.
Unknown date	Varuna	Barque	W. Briggs	Sunderland	United Kingdom	For Briggs & Sons.
Unknown date	Victoria	Barque	William Doxford	Sunderland	United Kingdom	For Olano & Co.
Unknown date	Weardale	Steamship	James Laing	Sunderland	United Kingdom	For J. Laing.
Unknown date	Westbury	Barque	W. Pile	Sunderland	United Kingdom	For Walker & Co.
Unknown date	Woodside	Brig	G. Bartram	Sunderland	United Kingdom	For Bartram & Co.
