= Manistee =

Manistee may refer to:

== Places ==
- Manistee, Michigan
- Manistee, Alabama
- Manistee County, Michigan
  - Manistee County-Blacker Airport
- Manistee Township, Michigan
- Manistee National Forest, jointly administered as part of the Huron-Manistee National Forests in Michigan
- Manistee River, Michigan
- Manistee Light, at the mouth of the river
- Manistee Railroad, Michigan

== Ships ==
- SS Manistee (1867), an American passenger-cargo steamer that disappeared on Lake Superior in 1883
- SS Manistee (1920), a British banana carrier that was sunk in 1941
- USS Manistee (YT-173) US Navy tugboat, built in 1941
- USS Manistee (YTB-782) US Navy tugboat, built in 1965

== See also ==
- Manatee
