= List of shipwrecks in 1892 =

The list of shipwrecks in 1892 includes ships sunk, foundered, grounded, or otherwise lost during 1892.

table of contents
1892
Jan	Feb	Mar	Apr
May	Jun	Jul	Aug
Sep	Oct	Nov	Dec
Unknown date

== January ==
=== 5 January ===
List of shipwrecks: 5 January 1892
Ship	State	Description
H. B. Griffin	United States	The schooner was destroyed by fire at Yarmouth, Nova Scotia.

=== 6 January ===
List of shipwrecks: 6 January 1892
Ship	State	Description
USRC Gallatin	United States Revenue-Marine	Also known as USRC Albert Gallatin, the 142-foot (43 m), 250-ton revenue cutter was wrecked on the northwest side of Boo Hoo Ledge in the Atlantic Ocean off Manchester, Maine, United States, with the loss of one life. Her wreck is located at (42°33′50″N 70°44′52″W) in up to 50 feet (15 m) of water.

=== 8 January ===
List of shipwrecks: 8 January 1892
Ship	State	Description
Namchow	Straits Settlements	The steamer foundered off Cupchi Point, or four miles (6.4 km) off Breaker Point, China. 414 killed.

=== 10 January ===
List of shipwrecks: 10 January 1892
Ship	State	Description
N. B. Palmer	Norway	The clipper was abandoned in the Atlantic Ocean.

=== 25 January ===
List of shipwrecks: 25 January 1892
Ship	State	Description
S. M. Lake	Canada	The schooner capsized at Black River in a heavy gale. The crew were saved.

=== 28 January ===
List of shipwrecks: 28 January 1892
Ship	State	Description
No.7	United Kingdom	The Admiralty lighter (in tow from Deptford and Plymouth for Pembroke Dock, with naval stores), broke away from armed tug HMS Traveller (Royal Navy) on 26 January near the Longships rocks, and drifted in heavy weather. On 28 January it was wrecked on the coast at Morwenstow, Cornwall.

=== 29 January ===
List of shipwrecks: 29 January 1892
Ship	State	Description
Starry Flag	United States	The schooner was wrecked on Cape Island Rock, near Kennebunk, Maine. The crew were saved.

== February ==
=== 1 February ===
List of shipwrecks: 1 February 1892
Ship	State	Description
Morril Boy	United States	The schooner was wrecked at Pigeon Cove. The crew were saved.

=== 7 February ===
List of shipwrecks: 7 February 1892
Ship	State	Description
Charles C. Warren	United States	The schooner capsized and sank off Yarmouth, Nova Scotia. The crew were saved.

=== 13 February ===
List of shipwrecks: 13 February 1892
Ship	State	Description
H. A. Duncan	United States	The schooner developed a leak in the gale on 11/12 February off Newfoundland. The crew was taken off just before she sank by the schooner Sylth (Canada).

=== 17 February ===
List of shipwrecks: 17 February 1892
Ship	State	Description
Rosebank	United Kingdom	The lugger was blown ashore at the back of the breakwater at Gourdon, Aberdeenshire and became a total wreck; the crew of three was rescued. She was arriving in ballast from Fraserburgh.
Voladra	Spain	The barque was abandoned in the Atlantic Ocean.

=== 19 February ===
List of shipwrecks: 19 February 1892
Ship	State	Description
Messina	Germany	The cargo steamer foundered off the Isles of Scilly, United Kingdom on passage Cardiff for Marseille with coal. Only one survivor.

=== 21 February ===
List of shipwrecks: 21 February 1892
Ship	State	Description
Tunisie	France	The ship was driven ashore on Lundy Island, Devon, United Kingdom. Her 21 crew were rescued.

=== Unknown date ===
List of shipwrecks: 21 February 1892
Ship	State	Description
Star of Erin	United Kingdom	The full-rigged ship was wrecked in the Forveaux Straits, New Zealand.
Soudan	United Kingdom	The ship, belonging to the British and Eastern Shipping Company, was carrying grain from Tacoma to Antwerp when she wrecked off North Point on Ascension Island (7°53.266′S 14°22.599′W), without loss of life.

== March ==
=== 8 March ===
List of shipwrecks: 8 March 1892
Ship	State	Description
County of Salop	United Kingdom	The steamer was wrecked at Wanson Mouth near Bude, Cornwall, United Kingdom.
Elginshire	United Kingdom	Elginshire The ship was driven ashore and wrecked at Timaru, New Zealand.

=== 16 March ===
List of shipwrecks: 16 March 1892
Ship	State	Description
Abington	United Kingdom	Abington sunk in shallow water The steamship collided with the steamship Activa (Germany) and sank in the Scheldt at Antwerp, Belgium. Abington was on a voyage from Rio de Janeiro, Brazil to Antwerp. The wreck was raised and scrapped in 1893.

=== 20 March ===
List of shipwrecks: 20 March 1892
Ship	State	Description
William Lewis	United States	The 463-gross register ton, 134-foot (41 m) steam whaling bark, aground on a sandspit off Point Barrow, District of Alaska, since 3 October 1891, was destroyed by an accidental fire that broke out during salvage operations.

=== Unknown date ===
List of shipwrecks: Unknown date June 1893
Ship	State	Description
Harry White	United States	The schooner was sunk in a collision in Block Island Sound between Block Island and the coast of Rhode Island.

== April ==
=== 12 April ===
List of shipwrecks: 12 April 1892
Ship	State	Description
Alexander	United States	The 128.88-ton whaling brig was wrecked on a reef in the Bering Sea on the northwest coast of Saint Paul Island in the Pribilof Islands. Her crew of 29 reached the shore and survived and eventually were picked up by the revenue cutter USRC Bear ( United States Revenue-Marine).

=== 20 April ===
List of shipwrecks: 20 April 1892
Ship	State	Description
City of Cheboygan	United States	The schooner was wrecked by unknown schooner in the Detroit River. Refloated, repaired and returned to service.

== May ==
=== 3 May ===
List of shipwrecks: 3 May 1892
Ship	State	Description
Christiana	United Kingdom	The smack ran aground and was wrecked at Cardigan. Her two crew were rescued by Lizzie & Charles Leigh Clare ( Royal National Lifeboat Institution). She was on a voyage from Caernarfon to Llangrannog, Glamorgan.

=== 5 May ===
List of shipwrecks: 5 May 1892
Ship	State	Description
Frascati	Germany	The steamer ran aground at Cape Town, South Africa. Later refloated and returned to service.
Water Lily	United States	The schooner was rammed, and cut in two, and sunk by Estella (United States) off the mouth of the harbor of Gloucester, Massachusetts. Both crewmen on board were rescued by Estella.

=== 17 May ===
List of shipwrecks: 17 May 1892
Ship	State	Description
Nellie N. Rowe	United States	The schooner was wrecked on Gull Rock, near Lockeport, Nova Scotia. The crew were saved.

=== 18 May ===
List of shipwrecks: 18 May 1892
Ship	State	Description
Alma	United States	Bound from gravel pits north of Milwaukee, Wisconsin, to Milwaukee itself with a cargo of gravel, the 57.4-foot (17.5 m), 26-gross register ton scow schooner capsized in heavy seas off Milwaukee after her hold filled with water. Her three-man crew clung to her overturned hull until rescued by the fishing schooner Prince (United States). Alma then drifted ashore onto rocks and probably broke up there in 15 to 20 feet (4.6 to 6.1 m) of water.

=== 27 May ===
List of shipwrecks: 27 May 1892
Ship	State	Description
Harley	United Kingdom	The steamship ran onto the Runnel Stone, off Land's End, Cornwall, United Kingdom and quickly sank. Her crew abandoned ship and eventually reached shore in the ship's boats. She was on a ballast voyage from Looe, Cornwall to Neath, Glamorgan, Wales.

== June ==
=== 11 June ===
List of shipwrecks: 11 June 1892
Ship	State	Description
Little Fanny	United States	The boat capsized at Rockland, Maine. The captain and one crewman died.

=== 12 June ===
List of shipwrecks: 12 June 1892
Ship	State	Description
Alice E. Wilds	United States	During a voyage from Chicago, Illinois, to Escanaba, Michigan, either in ballast or carrying a cargo of either coal or wood (according to various sources), the 136-foot (41 m), 292.86-gross register ton screw steamer sank without loss of life in Lake Michigan in 300 feet (91 m) of water 18 nautical miles (33 km; 21 mi) off Milwaukee, Wisconsin, within three minutes of colliding in heavy fog with the steamer Douglas (United States). Douglas rescued her crew. A wreck discovered in May 2015 appears to be that of Alice E. Wilds.

=== 22 June ===
List of shipwrecks: 22 June 1892
Ship	State	Description
City of Chicago	United Kingdom	The passenger ship ran aground off the Old Head of Kinsale, County Cork, Ireland. All on board, including 1,100 passengers, were rescued. She broke up and sank a few days later.
Fred B. Taylor	Canada	The wooden, fully-rigged sailing ship was cut in two in a collision in fog with the steamer Trave (Germany) in the Atlantic Ocean 100 nautical miles (190 km) south east of Sandy Hook, New Jersey, United States, with the loss of two of her 21 crew. The survivors were rescued by Trave. The stern section came ashore at Wells, Maine, United States on 7 August. The bow section drifted ashore on the coast of North Carolina, United States, between Bodies Island and Carrituck Inlet.

=== 27 June ===
List of shipwrecks: 27 June 1892
Ship	State	Description
Champion	United States	The schooner was wrecked on Gull Rock, near Lockeport, Nova Scotia. She caught fire and was destroyed. The crew were saved.

== July ==
=== 1 July ===
List of shipwrecks: 1 July 1892
Ship	State	Description
Ella Moore	Canada	Ella Moore The barque ran aground near Canso, Nova Scotia. She was later refloated, repaired and returned to service.

=== 14 July ===
List of shipwrecks: 14 July 1892
Ship	State	Description
G. P. Whitman	United States	The schooner was wrecked off Rose Blanche, Newfoundland. The crew was saved.

=== 23 July ===
List of shipwrecks: 23 July 1892
Ship	State	Description
Laura Sayward	United States	The schooner sprang a leak and sank. The crew made it to shore in her boats.

=== 25 July ===
List of shipwrecks: 25 July 1892
Ship	State	Description
Alva	United States	The 285-foot (87 m) steam luxury yacht — the property of William K. Vanderbilt — sank in 50 feet (15 m) of water on Pollock Rip Shoal off Chatham, Massachusetts, after the steamer H. F. Dimock (flag unknown) rammed her in fog.

=== Unknown date ===
List of shipwrecks: Unknown date July 1892
Ship	State	Description
Beaver	Canada	The partially stripped wreck of the steamer, aground on rocks at Stanley Park, Vancouver, British Columbia, Canada, since 17 July 1888, sank after being struck by the wake of the passing steamer Yosemite.

== August ==
=== 6 August ===
List of shipwrecks: 6 August 1892
Ship	State	Description
Alabama	United States	The schooner was wrecked on Boon Island Ledge. The crew were saved.

=== 8 August ===
List of shipwrecks: 8 August 1892
Ship	State	Description
HM Torpedo Boat 75	Royal Navy	The torpedo boat was sunk in a collision with HM Torpedo Boat 77 off The Maidens in the North Channel off County Antrim, Ireland, UK.

=== 20 August ===
List of shipwrecks: 20 August 1892
Ship	State	Description
Albatross	United States	While attempting to enter Lituya Bay in Southeast Alaska, the 7.22-gross register ton, 31.1-foot (9.5 m) schooner drifted onto rocks in the bay inside Harbor Point (58°37′N 137°39′W) and was wrecked. Her crew of two survived, but she was deemed a total loss.

=== 25 August ===
List of shipwrecks: 25 August 1892
Ship	State	Description
George and Maria	United Kingdom	The 71.4-foot (21.8 m) coastal ketch ran aground leaving Mountcharles, County Donegal, Ireland, UK. The ship was refloated the next day with the loss of both anchors and still leaking. The vessel was beached inside Green Island in the bay. Refloated on unknown date, repaired, and returned to service.

=== 30 August ===
List of shipwrecks: 30 August 1892
Ship	State	Description
Western Reserve	United States	The 300-foot (91 m), 2,392-ton lake freighter suffered a structural failure, broke in two, and sank in a gale 60 miles (97 km) northwest of Whitefish Point in 600 feet (180 m) of water in Lake Superior with the loss of 31 lives, including her owner and his family. There was one survivor. The wreck was located in mid 2024.

=== 31 August ===
List of shipwrecks: 31 August 1892
Ship	State	Description
Active	United States	The 14.3-ton, 41.2-foot (12.6 m) schooner was wrecked in "Marosco Bay, Cold Harbor," probably a reference to Morozovski Bay – a name commonly used for Cold Bay at the time – on the Alaska Peninsula in the District of Alaska. Her crew of eight survived.

== September ==
=== 8 September ===
List of shipwrecks: 8 September 1892
Ship	State	Description
Charles W. Wetmore	United States	The whaleback steam cargo ship ran aground at Coos Bay, Oregon, and was abandoned.

=== 17 September ===
List of shipwrecks: 17 September 1892
Ship	State	Description
Vienna	United States	The steamer was accidentally rammed by the steamer Nipigon ( Canada) and sank in Whitefish Bay, Lake Superior.

== October ==
=== 1 October ===
List of shipwrecks: 1 October 1892
Ship	State	Description
Camiola	United Kingdom	Despite warning signals from the Sevenstones Lightship, the Newcastle steamer struck the Seven Stones Reef at full speed and quickly sank; all of her crew managed to get into the ship's two boats. She was carrying 3,400 tons of coal from Cardiff to Naples, or Barry Docks to Malta.

=== 6 October ===
List of shipwrecks: 6 October 1892
Ship	State	Description
Helen Mar	United States	The 110-foot (33.5 m) whaling bark sank in the Chukchi Sea northwest of Point Barrow, District of Alaska, with the loss of 27 lives after she was caught in a swift current and crushed between two icebergs. Her five survivors clung to her mainmast as she sank, escaped onto the ice, and were rescued on 8 October by the whaling steamer Orca (United States).

=== 9 October ===
List of shipwrecks: 9 October 1892
Ship	State	Description
Sirene	Norway	The barque was wrecked alongside North Pier at Blackpool, Lancashire, England, during a storm. Her entire crew of 11 survived by jumping onto the pier.

=== 18 October ===
List of shipwrecks: 18 October 1892
Ship	State	Description
Elizabeth Mary	United States	The 49-foot (14.9 m) steamer was wrecked in Cook Inlet on the south-central coast of the District of Alaska during a gale. Her crew of three survived.

=== 26 October ===
List of shipwrecks: 26 October 1892
Ship	State	Description
J. P. Allen	United States	The schooner was sunk by a whirlwind 55 miles (89 km) east of Pensacola, Florida.

=== 28 October ===
List of shipwrecks: 28 October 1892
Ship	State	Description
A. P. Nichols	United States	Bound from Chicago, Illinois, for Escanaba, Michigan, the 145.2-foot (44.3 m), 299.67-gross register ton three-masted schooner ran aground on a reef in Lake Michigan off Pilot Island in Door County, Wisconsin. Her crew survived and sheltered at Pilot Island Light. She was still on the reef when a storm struck in March 1893, during which she broke up and sank. Her wreckage lies scattered in waters 25 to 55 feet (7.6 to 16.8 m) deep about 300 feet (91 m) west of the Pilot Island boat dock at 45°17.120′N 086°55.091′W.
Roumania	United Kingdom	The Anchor Line steel screw steamer Roumania went aground near the Óbidos Lagoon Inlet on the west coast of Portugal with the loss of 120 lives.

=== 28–29 October ===
List of shipwrecks: 28–29 October 1892
Ship	State	Description
Flying Cloud	United States	The schooner dragged anchor and was wrecked on rocks in Lake Michigan at Glen Arbor Township, Michigan in a squall.
Ostrich	United States	The schooner capsized in Lake Michigan in a squall and was driven ashore on South Manitou Island with the loss of her entire crew.
W.H. Gilcher	United States	The lake freighter sank during the night of 28–29 October in Lake Michigan somewhere near North Manitou Island with the loss of her entire crew, variously reported as 18 or 22 men.

== November ==
=== 2 November ===
List of shipwrecks: 2 November 1892
Ship	State	Description
HMS Howe	Royal Navy	The Admiral-class battleship ran aground on a shoal off Ferrol, Spain, primarily due to faulty charts. Salvage was difficult, and she was not refloated until 30 March 1893. She was repaired and returned to service.

=== 8 November ===
List of shipwrecks: 8 November 1892
Ship	State	Description
Watergeus	United Kingdom	The steamer sank after a collision in Shanghai harbour.

=== 17 November ===
List of shipwrecks: 17 November 1892
Ship	State	Description
Abbey Town	Sweden	The three-masted sailing ship, previously called Ida, was wrecked in Perelle Bay on the west coast of Guernsey in the Channel Islands during a voyage from Raine Island to Granville, Manche, with a cargo of guano.

=== 18 November ===
List of shipwrecks: 18 November 1892
Ship	State	Description
Hattie Wells	United States	The schooner barge went ashore five miles (8.0 km) from Point Pelee, Ontario. Reported a week later as going to pieces, but salvaged in July 1893 and taken to Port Huron, Michigan, with repairs finished on 19 September 1893.
Prince Charlie	United Kingdom	The 24-ton sailing smack ran into the anchored Malgorm Castle (United Kingdom) in thick fog. Malgorm Castle took off her crew and cut her loose, she drifted away in the direction of the Morecamby Lightship sinking some 13 miles away.

=== 24 November ===
List of shipwrecks: 24 November 1892
Ship	State	Description
Mauritius	Norway	The ship was wrecked at Cardiff, Glamorgan, United Kingdom.

=== 27 November ===
List of shipwrecks: 27 November 1892
Ship	State	Description
Leo	United States	The 155-ton schooner struck a rock and sank in Port Houghton Bay (57°03′N 135°22′W) in Southeast Alaska. She was refloated and subsequently served in a cove at Japonski Island in the harbor at Sitka, District of Alaska, as a quarantine hulk and later as a prison hulk.

=== 30 November ===
List of shipwrecks: 30 November 1892
Ship	State	Description
Chishima	Imperial Japanese Navy	The unprotected cruiser sank after a collision in Seto Inland Sea with P&O merchant vessel Ravenna (United Kingdom) with the loss of 90 lives.
Kate Harding	United Kingdom	During a storm, the 712-ton three-masted barque was wrecked on Nauset Beach near Highland Light on Cape Cod on the coast of Massachusetts.

=== Unknown date ===
List of shipwrecks: unknown November 1892
Ship	State	Description
Knights Templar	United States	The schooner was damaged in a collision with an unknown schooner in a snowstorm eight miles (13 km) off Sambro, Nova Scotia. She filled and sank. The crew took to her boats and were rescued six hours later by a pilot boat.

== December ==
=== 7 December ===
List of shipwrecks: 3 December 1892
Ship	State	Description
HMS Sandfly (1872)	United Kingdom	The schooner was swept onto rocks by the tide while loading at Makira in the Solomon Islands. The crew were saved.

=== 7 December ===
List of shipwrecks: 7 December 1892
Ship	State	Description
Northerner	United States	The steam barge ran aground on Keweenaw Point in fog. She was refloated and taken to L'Anse, Michigan.

=== 9 December ===
List of shipwrecks: 9 December 1892
Ship	State	Description
Duke	United Kingdom	During a voyage from Runcorn, Cheshire to Cardigan, the schooner was driven ashore and wrecked at Cemaes Head, Cardiganshire, Wales. Her crew were rescued by the lifeboat Lizzie & Charles Leigh Clare ( Royal National Lifeboat Institution).

=== 11 December ===
List of shipwrecks: 11 December 1892
Ship	State	Description
Northerner	United States	The steam barge caught fire at L'Anse, Michigan when a kerosene lamp was dropped in a possible arson fire. The fire destroyed the vessel, dock, and warehouse. She was scuttled off the dock in 10–15 feet (3.0–4.6 m) of water.

=== 18 December ===
List of shipwrecks: 18 December 1892
Ship	State	Description
Bokhara	United Kingdom	The steam passenger ship struck a reef in the Taiwan Strait off Sand Island in the Pescadores during a typhoon and foundered with the loss of 125 of the 150 people on board. She was on a voyage from Shanghai, China, to Hong Kong.

=== 20 December ===
List of shipwrecks: 20 December 1892
Ship	State	Description
Nubian	United Kingdom	The passenger-cargo steamer sank in the Atlantic Ocean off Lisbon, Portugal.

=== 28 December ===
List of shipwrecks: 28 December 1892
Ship	State	Description
Esther Ward	United States	The schooner went ashore on Cape Cod. The crew were saved.

== Unknown date ==
List of shipwrecks: Unknown date
Ship	State	Description
Bessie Reuter	United States	The 31-ton schooner was lost with all hands off the District of Alaska.
Danube	United Kingdom	The sailing ship disappeared during a voyage from Guadeloupe to New York City.
Henry Davey		The schooner was lost off "Squan," a term used at the time for the coast of New Jersey near Manasquan and sometimes for the 7-mile (11 km) stretch of coast between Manasquan Inlet and Cranberry Inlet or for the entire coast of New Jersey between Sea Girt and Barnegat Inlet.
Seignelay	French Navy	The unprotected cruiser was wrecked.
