= Russian monitor Smerch =

Imperial Russian Navy's monitor

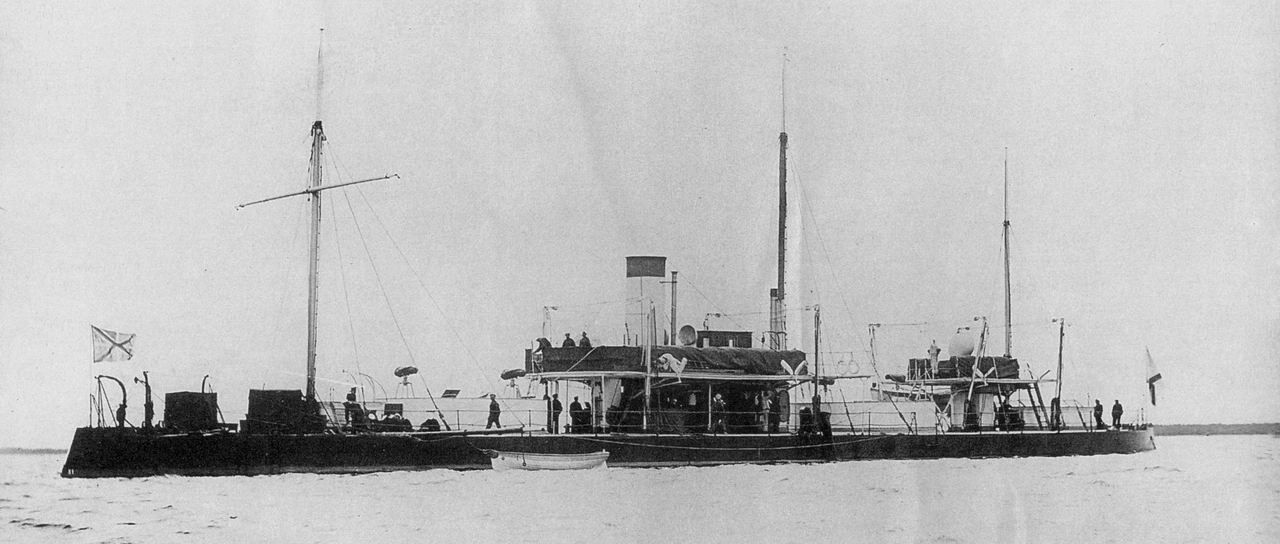
- Smerch at anchor; her two turrets are painted white

Class overview
- Operators: Imperial Russian Navy
- Preceded by: Uragan class
- Succeeded by: Charodeika class
- Cost: 554,100 rubles
- Built: 1863–65
- In service: 1865–86
- Completed: 1
- Scrapped: 1

History

Russian Empire
- Name: Smerch (Russian: Смерч)
- Namesake: Waterspout
- Ordered: 25 June 1863 (Note: All dates used in this article are New Style)
- Builder: Admiralty Shipyard, Saint Petersburg
- Yard number: 117
- Laid down: 1 December 1863
- Launched: 23 June 1864
- Completed: 1865
- Renamed: Blokshiv No. 2, 27 October 1909; Blokshiv No. 3, 1923; Blokshiv No. 1, 1 January 1932; BSh-1, 16 May 1949
- Reclassified: As coast-defense ironclad, 13 February 1892
- Stricken: 20 February 1904; 6 March 1942; 2 April 1959
- Fate: Scrapped after 2 April 1959.

General characteristics (as completed)
- Type: Monitor
- Displacement: 1,560 long tons (1,585 t)
- Length: 188 ft 8 in (57.5 m) (waterline)
- Beam: 38 ft 2 in (11.6 m)
- Draft: 12 ft (3.7 m)
- Installed power: 800 ihp (600 kW); 3 rectangular boilers
- Propulsion: 2 shafts, 2 Horizontal direct-action steam engines
- Speed: 8 knots (15 km/h; 9.2 mph)
- Complement: 133 officers and crewmen (1867)
- Armament: 2 × twin 60-pounder 7.72-inch (196 mm) smoothbore guns
- Armor: Belt: 4–4.5 in (102–114 mm); Gun turrets: 4.5–6 in (114–152 mm); Deck: 1 in (25 mm); Conning tower: 4.5 in (114 mm)

Smerch (Russian: Смерч) was a monitor built for the Imperial Russian Navy in the early 1860s. She was designed by the British shipbuilder Charles Mitchell and built in Saint Petersburg. The ship spent her entire career with the Baltic Fleet. She ran aground and sank shortly after she entered service in 1865. Smerch was refloated and repaired shortly afterwards. She became a training ship sometime after 1892 and was stricken from the Navy List in 1904. The ship was hulked five years later and renamed Blokshiv No. 2. She was in Finland when that country declared its independence in 1918, but was returned to the Soviets after the Treaty of Brest-Litovsk was signed. Blokshiv No. 1, as the ship was now known, was sunk by German artillery fire in 1941. She was salvaged the following year and remained in service until she was stricken in 1959 and subsequently broken up.

== Design and description ==
The Russian Admiralty Board had previously licensed the design of the Passaic class from the United States and wished to compare the John Ericsson-designed gun turrets of those ships with the turrets designed by the British inventor Captain Cowper Coles. The board therefore commissioned Mitchell to design a twin-turret monitor based on the Danish ironclad Rolf Krake and to build it in the shipyard that he had modernized for the board in Saint Petersburg, Russia.

Smerch was 188 feet 8 inches (57.5 m) long at the waterline. She had a beam of 38 feet 2 inches (11.6 m) and a maximum draft of 12 feet (3.7 m). The ship was designed to displace 1,460 long tons (1,480 t), but turned out to be overweight and actually displaced 1,560 long tons (1,590 t). Smerch was fitted with a double bottom that could be flooded in combat to reduce her freeboard. Her crew numbered 11 officers and 122 enlisted men in 1867 and 12 officers and 143 crewmen in 1875.

She had a freeboard of only 2–2.5 feet (0.6–0.8 m) and her deck was often awash in any sort of moderate sea. Smerch rolled heavily and was fitted with three telescoping iron pole masts, probably fore-and-aft rigged, that were used to steady the ship rather than for propulsion.

=== Propulsion ===
The ship had two simple horizontal direct-acting steam engines, built by Maudslay, Sons and Field of London. The engines had a bore of 36 inches (0.91 m) and a stroke of 18 inches (0.46 m) and each drove a single 7-foot-10-inch (2.39 m) propeller. Steam was provided by three rectangular fire-tube boilers at a pressure of 1.7 atm (172 kPa; 25 psi). The engines produced a total of 800 indicated horsepower (600 kW) which gave Smerch a maximum speed of about 8.3 knots (15.4 km/h; 9.6 mph) when she ran her sea trials from 12 to 17 June 1865. The ship also had a small donkey boiler for the small steam engine that powered the ventilation fans, the main water pump and rotated the aft turret. Another such engine probably rotated the forward turret. She carried 110 long tons (112 t) of coal which gave her a range of 600–800 nmi (1,100–1,500 km; 690–920 mi).

=== Armament ===
Smerch was initially armed with four 60-pounder 7.72-inch (196 mm) smoothbore muzzle-loading guns, a pair in each turret. Various deckhouses and ventilation hatches prevented the turrets from firing directly forward or aft, so each turret could bear approximately 145° to each side, although this changed slightly over time as changes were made to the ship. In 1867 these were replaced by two Krupp 8-inch (200 mm) rifled breech-loading guns. Only one gun could fit in the turrets so the old gun ports were plated over and new ones cut in each turret. Three years later, the Krupp guns were replaced by Obukhov 9-inch (229 mm) rifled guns. They were replaced in their turn in 1876 by two longer, more powerful 9-inch Obukhov guns. The ship carried 120 rounds for each gun. A furnace for the molten iron required by Martin's incendiary shells was fitted between the turrets.

Light guns for use against torpedo boats are not known to have been fitted aboard the ship before the 1870s when Smerch received four 4-pounder 3.4-inch (86 mm) guns, one 45-millimeter (1.8 in) Engström quick-firing (QF) gun, and a .65-inch (17 mm) Gatling gun. At some point the ship received four QF 37-millimeter (1.5 in) Hotchkiss revolving cannon. They were mounted on the turret tops and probably replaced the older 4-pounders.

=== Armor ===
Smerch had a complete waterline belt of wrought iron that was 4.5 inches (114 mm) thick amidships and thinned to 4 inches (102 mm) at the ends of the ship. It was 7 feet (2 m) high and completely covered the hull to 4 feet 6 inches (1 m) below the waterline. The armor was backed by 8 inches of teak. The circular turrets were protected by armor 4.5 inches thick and the area around the gun ports was reinforced by 1.5-inch (38 mm) plates to give a total thickness of 6 inches (152 mm). The walls of the ship's oval conning tower were also 4.5 inches thick. Her deck was 1 inch (25 mm) thick.

== Construction and service ==
Smerch (Waterspout) was ordered on 25 June 1863 and construction began on 13 August at the Admiralty Shipyard, Saint Petersburg, although the formal keel-laying was not until 1 December. She was launched on 23 June 1864 and completed in 1865 at the cost of 554,100 rubles. The ship spent her career with the Baltic Fleet. Smerch struck an uncharted rock off the Finnish coast on 4 August in shallow water and sank. Using pontoons, she was refloated on 1 September and repaired. Little is known of her service other than she was extensively refitted in 1882 and 1889 which included replacement of much of the plating of her hull bottom. The ship was reclassified as a coast-defense ironclad on 13 February 1892 and subsequently became a training ship.

The ship was stricken from the Navy List on 20 February 1904 and turned over to the Port of Kronstadt for disposal. Smerch was renamed Blokshiv (Hulk) No. 2 on 27 October 1909 and converted into a mine storage hulk. She was abandoned in April 1918 as the Soviets abandoned Finland, but was returned to them the following month according to the terms of the Treaty of Brest-Litovsk. The hulk was renamed Blokshiv No. 3 in 1923 and later as Blokshiv No. 1 on 1 January 1932. She was sunk by German artillery on 7 October 1941 in Kronstadt harbor and was stricken on 6 March 1942. The hulk was salvaged in mid-1942 and reentered service on 8 December. She was renamed BSh-1 on 16 May 1949, stricken for the last time on 2 April 1959, and subsequently scrapped.
