= USRC Active (1867) =

Ship of the U.S. Revenue Cutter Service

History

United States
- Name: USRC Active
- Namesake: In action; moving; causing action or change
- Builder: J.W. Lynn, Philadelphia, Pennsylvania
- Cost: US$18,500
- Completed: 1867
- Commissioned: 1867
- Homeport: New Bedford, Massachusetts, 19 June 1867–7 April 1875
- Fate: Sold 13 May 1875 at Staten Island, New York for US$5,508.50

General characteristics
- Class & type: Active-class schooner
- Displacement: 120 tons
- Length: 90 ft (27 m)
- Beam: 19 ft (5.8 m)
- Draft: 7 ft 10 in (2.39 m)
- Sail plan: schooner
- Armament: 1 gun

USRC Active, was a revenue cutter of the United States Revenue Cutter Service in commission from 1867 to 1875. She was the fifth Revenue Cutter Service ship to bear the name.

== History ==
Built at Philadelphia, Pennsylvania, by J.W. Lynn, Active was commissioned in 1867 and served her entire career homeported at New Bedford, Massachusetts. She was the lead ship of the Active class of six revenue schooners built at three different yards. (Note: Colton claims that the Active-class consisted of only two ships, Active and Resolute, both constructed at the Lynn shipyard. The other four cutters that Canney claims are in the Active-class were built in different yards and had different dimensions than the cutters built at the Lynn shipyard. USRC Relief and USRC Rescue were constructed by Biery & Hillman of Philadelphia and had an overall length of 92 ft (28 m); USRC Petrel and USRC Racer were built by W.H. Hawthorn of Williamsburg, New York and had an overall length of 85 ft (26 m).) Active and her sister ship Resolute, also built by Lynn, were among the last strictly sail-powered cutters built for the Revenue Service.

== Notes ==
Footnotes

Citations

References used

- "Active, 1867". U.S. Coast Guard Cutters & Craft Index. U.S. Coast Guard Historian's Office.
- "Record of Movements, Vessels of the United States Coast Guard, 1790–December 31, 1933" (pdf). U.S. Coast Guard, Department of Transportation.
- Canney, Donald L. (1995). U.S. Coast Guard and Revenue Cutters, 1790–1935. Naval Institute Press, Annapolis, Maryland. ISBN 978-1-55750-101-1.
- Colton, Tim. "Revenue Cutters Built in the 18th and 19th Centuries". Shipbuilding History. shipbuildinghistory.com website.
