= SS Swarland =

Danish cargo ship

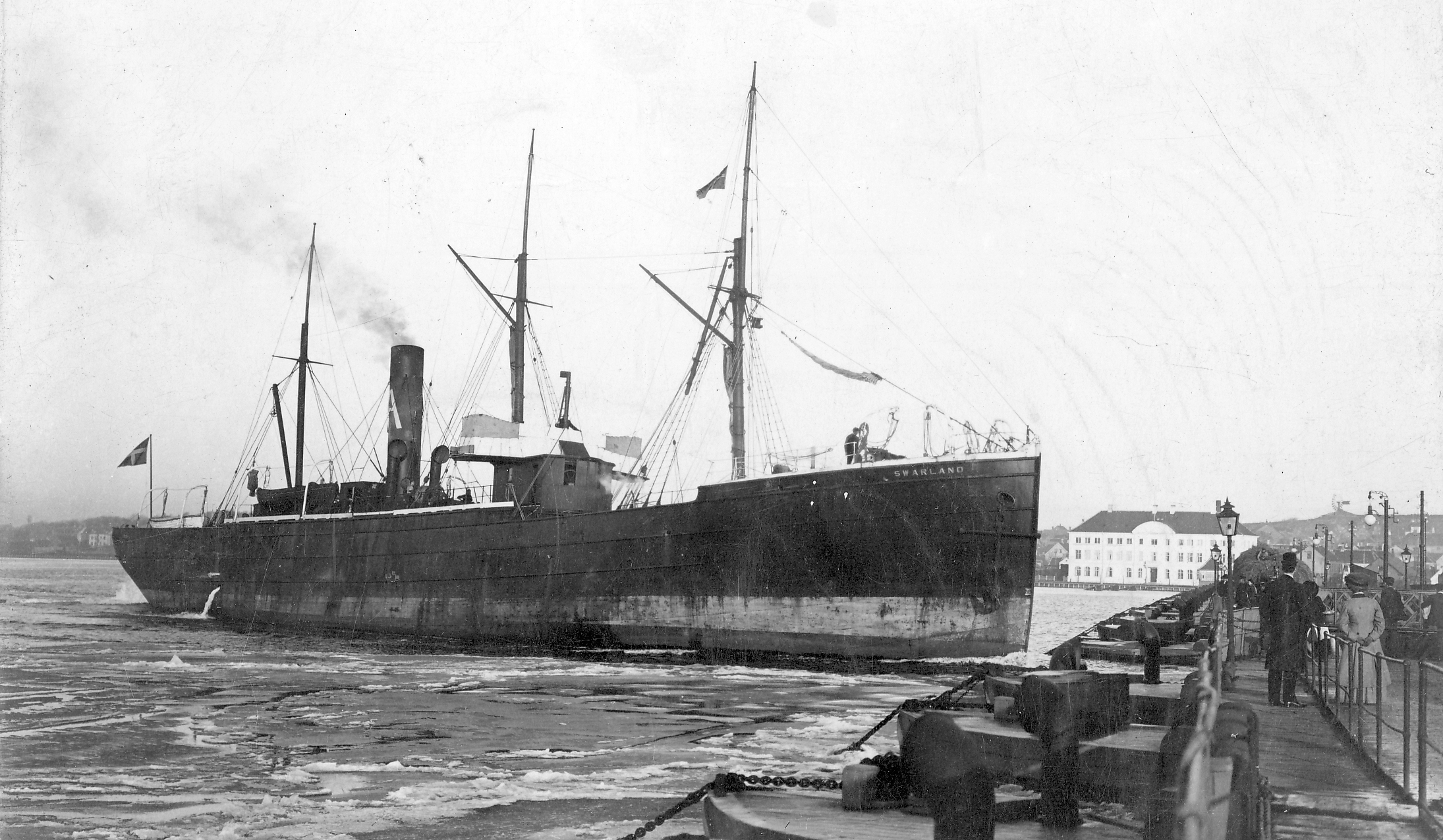
- Swarland

History
- Name: (Denmark) Swarland
- Port of registry: Renfrew, United Kingdom
- Builder: Henderson, Coulborn and Company
- Yard number: 92
- Launched: 15 August 1867
- Completed: 1867
- Maiden voyage: 1867
- In service: 1867
- Out of service: 30 September 1911
- Fate: Missing

General characteristics
- Type: cargo ship
- Tonnage: 826 GRT
- Installed power: Steam
- Propulsion: Screw propeller
- Speed: 9.5 knots

SS Swarland was a Danish cargo steamship, home-ported at Aalborg, which disappeared and foundered near the approaches to Rotterdam, the Netherlands, while sailing from Rostock, Germany, to Rotterdam in September 1911.

== Construction ==
The vessel had been built as Danmark in 1867 by Henderson, Coulborn and Company at Renfrew, United Kingdom, and was completed the same year. Constructed of iron, classed with Germanischer Lloyd and fitted with steam propulsion driving a single screw propeller, it measured 826 gross register tons and 491 net register tons. Its engine was rated at 100 nominal horsepower. At the time of the loss the ship was owned by A. Abel, commanded by Captain H. Kjøller, valued at 65,000 kroner and insured for the same amount with Danske Lloyd.

== Sinking ==
On 26 September 1911, Swarland left Rostock, Germany for Rotterdam, the Netherlands with a cargo of 861 tons of grain. It passed Brunsbüttel at 9 a.m. on 27 September. According to a report from the shipping company, dated Aalborg, 18 November 1911, the only subsequent information about the vessel was that it had been seen on 30 September, during a violent hurricane, about 16 nautical miles from the entrance to Rotterdam. The incident was recorded as a foundering, probably near the entrance to Rotterdam. Effects marked "Swarland" were later washed ashore on the Belgian coast, together with the body of the ship’s steward.

All 15 persons on board were lost. The crew numbered 14: Captain H. Kjøller; first mate C. Holm; second mate Ch. Mazar de la Garde; first engineer R. C. Møller; second engineer Westergaard Thomsen; steward M. Andersen; able seamen L. K. Kristensen, Senius C. Larsen of Fureby, Martin Rasmussen of Sønderholm and C. F. V. Olesen of Jetsmark; firemen K. F. Madsen, C. F. Steffensen of Rakkeby and C. V. S. Petersen of Aarhus; and cabin boy O. C. Larsen of Aalborg. The sole passenger was Margrethe Buchwald of Aalborg.
