= USRC Resolute =

Ship of the U.S. Revenue Cutter Service

History

United States
- Name: USRC Resolute
- Namesake: firmness or determination, pursuing a fixed purpose
- Builder: J.W. Lynn, Philadelphia, Pennsylvania
- Cost: US$18,500
- Completed: 1867
- Commissioned: 1867
- Homeport: Key West, Florida, 27 July 1867–10 February 1872
- Fate: Sold 10 February 1872 at Philadelphia, Pennsylvania

General characteristics
- Class & type: Active-class schooner
- Displacement: 120 tons
- Length: 90 ft (27 m)
- Beam: 19 ft (5.8 m)
- Draft: 7 ft 10 in (2.39 m)
- Sail plan: schooner
- Armament: 1 gun

USRC Resolute, was a revenue cutter of the United States Revenue Cutter Service in commission from 1867 to 1872. She was the only Revenue Cutter Service ship to bear the name.

== History ==
Built at Philadelphia, Pennsylvania, by J.W. Lynn, Resolute was commissioned in 1867 and served her entire career homeported at Key West, Florida. She was the second of the Active-class of six revenue schooners built at three different yards. (Note: Colton claims that the Active-class consisted of only two ships, Active and Resolute, both constructed at the Lynn shipyard. The other four cutters that Canney claims are in the Active-class were built in different yards and had different dimensions than the cutters built at the Lynn shipyard. USRC Relief and USRC Rescue were constructed by Biery & Hillman of Philadelphia and had an overall length of 92 ft (28 m); USRC Petrel and USRC Racer were built by W.H. Hawthorn of Williamsburg, New York and had an over all length of 85 ft (26 m).) Resolute and her sister ship Active, also built by Lynn, were among the last strictly sail-powered cutters built for the Revenue Service.
