= USRC Relief =

Ship of the U.S. Revenue Cutter Service

History

United States
- Name: USRC Relief
- Namesake: Assistance in time of difficulty.
- Builder: Bierly & Hillman, Philadelphia, Pennsylvania
- Cost: US$16,450
- Completed: 1867
- Commissioned: 1867
- Homeport: Indianola, Texas, 29 June 1867–19 July 1870 (Note: The last Revenue Service record of Relief was 19 July 1870)
- Fate: Unknown

General characteristics
- Class & type: Relief-class schooner
- Displacement: 120 tons
- Length: 92 ft (28 m)
- Beam: 20 ft (6.1 m)
- Draft: 7 ft (2.1 m)
- Sail plan: schooner
- Armament: 1 gun

USRC Relief, was a revenue cutter of the United States Revenue Cutter Service in commission from 1867 to at least 1870. She was the first Revenue Cutter Service ship to bear the name.

== History ==
Built at Philadelphia, Pennsylvania, by Bierly & Hillman, Relief was commissioned in 1867 and served what is known of her entire career homeported at Indianola, Texas. She was the lead ship of the Relief-class of two revenue schooners built to her specifications. (Note: Colton claims that the Relief-class consisted of only two ships, Relief and USRC Rescue, both constructed at the Bierly & Hillman shipyard. Canney claims Relief was one of six cutters of the Active-class. The other four cutters that Canney claims are in the Active-class were built in different yards and had different dimensions than the cutters built at the Bierly & Hillman shipyard. USRC Active and USRC Resolute were constructed by J.W. Lynn of Philadelphia and had a over all length of 90 ft (27 m); USRC Petrel and USRC Racer were built by W.H. Hawthorn of Williamsburg, New York and had an over all length of 85 ft (26 m).) Relief and her sister ship, Rescue also built by Bierly & Hillman, were among the last strictly sail-powered cutters built for the Revenue Service. On 18 September Relief was transferred temporarily to Key West, Florida due to an outbreak of yellow fever in the Indianola area. She returned from Key West on 5 December 1867. On 19 July 1870, she sailed for New Orleans for scheduled repairs. No Revenue Cutter Service record exists of her movements after 19 July 1870.

== Notes ==
Footnotes

Citations

References used

- "Relief, 1867". U.S. Coast Guard Cutters & Craft Index. U.S. Coast Guard Historian's Office.
- "Record of Movements, Vessels of the United States Coast Guard, 1790–December 31, 1933" (pdf). U.S. Coast Guard, Department of Transportation.
- Canney, Donald L. (1995). U.S. Coast Guard and Revenue Cutters, 1790–1935. Naval Institute Press, Annapolis, Maryland. ISBN 978-1-55750-101-1.
- Colton, Tim. "Revenue Cutters Built in the 18th and 19th Centuries". Shipbuilding History. shipbuildinghistory.com website.
