= Russian monitor Charodeika =

Russian lead ship of Charodeika-class

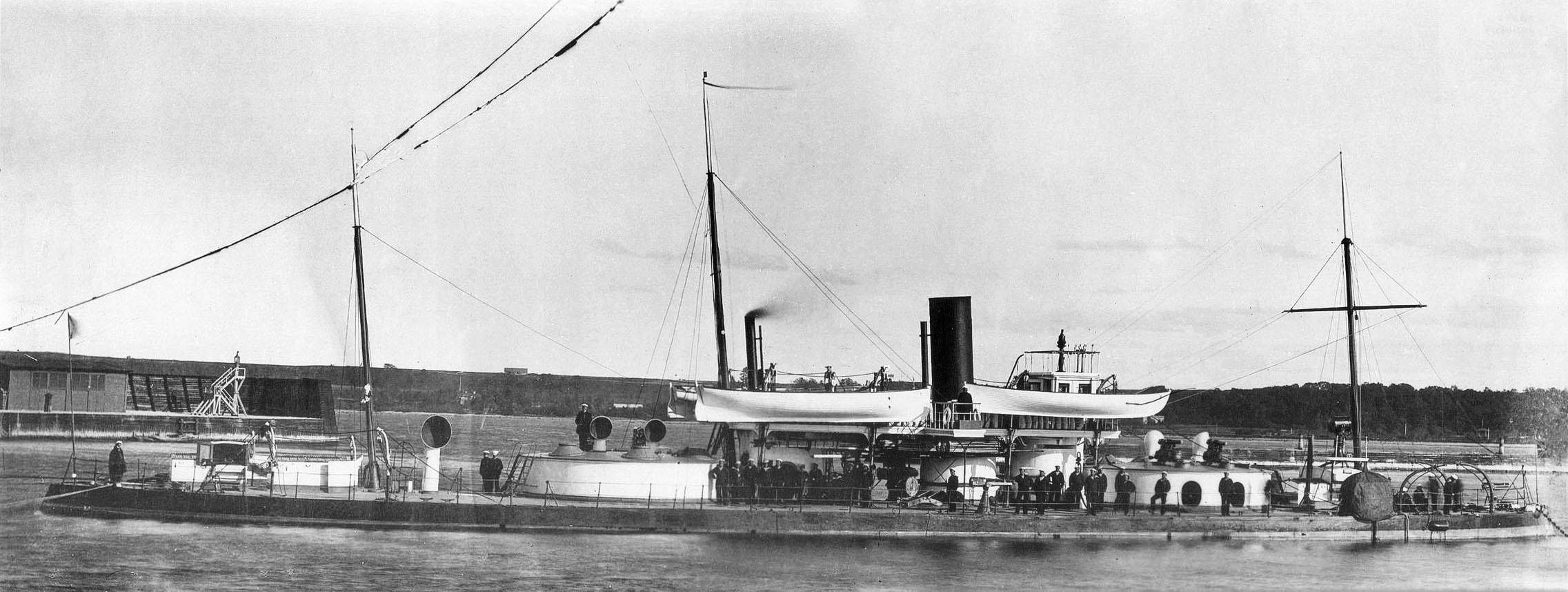
- Charodeika at anchor

History

Russian Empire
- Name: Charodeika
- Namesake: Sorceress
- Ordered: 26 January 1865 (Note: All dates used in this article are New Style)
- Builder: Admiralty Shipyard, Saint Petersburg
- Laid down: 6 June 1866
- Launched: 12 September 1867
- In service: 1869
- Reclassified: As a coast-defense ironclad, 13 February 1892
- Stricken: 7 April 1907
- Fate: Scrapped 1911–12

General characteristics (as completed)
- Class & type: Charodeika-class monitor
- Displacement: 2,100 long tons (2,134 t)
- Length: 206 ft (62.8 m) (waterline)
- Beam: 42 ft (12.8 m)
- Draft: 12 ft 7 in (3.8 m)
- Installed power: 875 ihp (652 kW); 2 rectangular boilers
- Propulsion: 2 shafts, 2 Horizontal direct-action steam engines
- Speed: 8 knots (15 km/h; 9.2 mph)
- Complement: 172 officers and crewmen
- Armament: 2 × 9-inch (229 mm) Smoothbore guns; 2 × 15-inch (381 mm) Rodman guns
- Armor: Belt: 3.25–4.5 in (83–114 mm); Gun turrets: 5.5 in (140 mm); Conning tower: 4.5 in (114 mm); Deck: 1 in (25 mm)

The Russian monitor Charodeika was the lead ship of her class of monitors built for the Imperial Russian Navy in the 1860s. She served for her entire career with the Baltic Fleet, mostly as a training ship. She was decommissioned in 1907, but was not broken up until 1911–12.

== Design and description ==
Charodeika was 206 feet (62.8 m) long at the waterline. She had a beam of 42 feet (12.8 m) and a maximum draft of 12 feet 7 inches (3.8 m). The ship was designed to displace 1,882 long tons (1,912 t), but turned out to be overweight and actually displaced 2,100 long tons (2,100 t). Her crew numbered 13 officers and 171 crewmen in 1877.

The ship had two simple horizontal direct-acting steam engines, each driving a single propeller. The engines were designed to produce a total of 900 indicated horsepower (670 kW) using steam provided by two coal-fired rectangular fire-tube boilers, but only achieved 786 ihp (586 kW) and a speed of approximately 8.5 knots (15.7 km/h; 9.8 mph) during her sea trials. She carried a maximum of 250 long tons (254 t) of coal for her boilers.

Charodeika was initially armed with a pair of nine-inch (229 mm) rifled Model 1867 guns in the forward gun turret and a pair of fifteen-inch (381 mm) smoothbore Rodman guns in the aft turret. The Rodman guns were replaced by a pair of Obukhov 9-inch (229 mm) rifled guns in 1871 and all of the nine-inch guns were replaced in their turn by longer, more powerful nine-inch Obukhov guns in 1878–79. No light guns for use against torpedo boats are known to have been fitted aboard the ship before the 1870s when she received 4 four-pounder 3.4-inch (86 mm) guns mounted on the turret tops as well as a variety of smaller guns that included 45-millimeter (1.8 in) Engström quick-firing (QF) guns, 1-inch (25 mm) Nordenfelt guns, single-barreled QF 47-millimeter (1.9 in) Hotchkiss guns, QF 37-millimeter (1.5 in) Hotchkiss revolving cannon, and 25-millimeter (0.98 in) Palmcrantz-Nordenfelt guns.

The ship had a complete waterline belt of wrought iron that was 4.5 inches (114 mm) thick amidships and thinned to 3.75 inches (95 mm) at the bow and 3.25 inches (83 mm) at the stern. The armor was backed by 12 to 18 inches (300 to 460 mm) of teak. The circular turrets were protected by armor 5.5 inches (140 mm) thick and the walls of the ship's oval conning tower were also 4.5 inches thick. Her deck was 1 inch (25 mm) thick amidships, but reduced to 0.25–0.5 inches (6.4–12.7 mm) at the ends of the ship.

== Construction and service ==
Charodeika (Sorceress) was ordered on 26 January 1865 and construction began on 10 June at the Admiralty Shipyard, Saint Petersburg, although the formal keel-laying was not until 6 June 1866. She was launched on 12 September 1867 and completed in 1869 at the cost of 762,000 rubles. Construction was considerably delayed by late deliveries of drawings, material, and the death of her original builder. The ship served her entire career with the Baltic Fleet and was later assigned to the Mine (Torpedo) Training Detachment. Charodeika was reclassified as a coast-defense ironclad on 13 February 1892 and remained in service until 31 March 1907 when she was turned over to the Port of Kronstadt for disposal. The ship was stricken from the Navy List on 7 April and was finally scrapped in 1911–12.

== Bibliography ==
- Chesneau, Roger & Kolesnik, Eugene M., eds. (1979). Conway's All the World's Fighting Ships 1860-1905. Greenwich, UK: Conway Maritime Press. ISBN 0-8317-0302-4.
- McLaughlin, Stephen (2013). "Russia's Coles 'Monitors': Smerch, Rusalka and Charodeika". In Jordan, John (ed.). Warship 2013. London: Conway. pp. 149–63. ISBN 978-1-84486-205-4.
- Silverstone, Paul H. (1984). Directory of the World's Capital Ships. New York: Hippocrene Books. ISBN 0-88254-979-0.
