= Annie Falconer =

Ship sunk in Lake Ontario in 1904

History
- Name: Annie Falconer
- Launched: May 22, 1867
- Fate: Sunk, November 12, 1904

General characteristics
- Tonnage: 175.49 (Reg), 197.14 (Gross)
- Length: 108 ft (33 m)
- Beam: 24 ft (7.3 m)
- Propulsion: Sail

The Annie Falconer was a two masted schooner that sank in Lake Ontario in November, 1904. The Falconer was laden with soft coal to be delivered to Picton.
