= Lady Alice Kenlis =

British scuttled steamship

Coordinates: 52°05′35″N 1°19′39″E

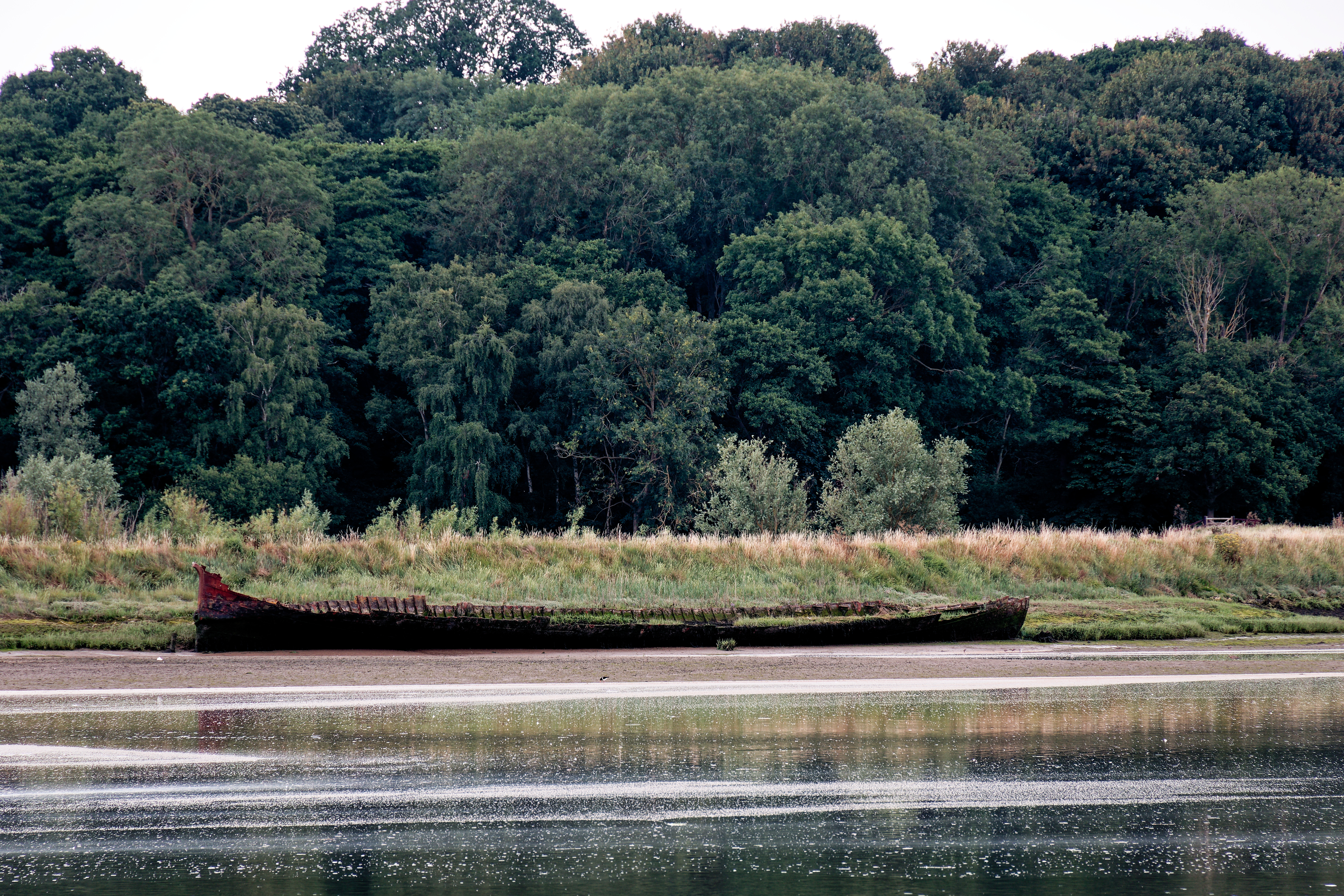
- The scuttled Lady Alice Kenlis in 2025

History

United Kingdom
- Name: Lady Alice Kenlis
- Namesake: Alice Kenlis
- Owner: Hugh Andrews
- Port of registry: (United Kingdom of Great Britain and Ireland) Belfast
- Builder: J&R Swan, Maryhill, Belfast
- Launched: 23 December 1867
- Fate: Scuttled

General characteristics
- Type: Steamship
- Tonnage: 213 GT; 145 GRT
- Length: 130 ft (40 m)
- Beam: 19 ft 9 in (6.02 m)
- Draught: 9 ft 10 in (3.00 m)

Lady Alice Kenlis was a steamship of 145 gross register tons (GRT) that was launched in 1867. An early design by Hercules Linton, it changed hands several times, being re-registered as Holman Sutcliffe in 1908. It was no longer registered by 1932. The ship was scuttled on the east bank of the River Deben opposite Woodbridge, Suffolk, England, in the late 1930s or early 1940s, and its hulk became a scheduled monument there in 2023.

== Building and initial naming ==
After being designed by Hercules Linton, the ship was constructed by J&R Swan in Maryhill, Glasgow in Scotland. It had a more heavily built hull than that of other ships of its time, allowing for loading and unloading by beaching as well as at quays and wharfs. It also featured a two-cylinder 40-horsepower (30 kW) engine, fed by two Greenock Foundry Company boilers. It was rigged as a three-masted schooner.

Initially, the ship was to be named Isabel Andrews, as a sister ship to Hugh Andrews' other ship Lady Alice Hill. Alice Hill's marriage to Lord Kenlis in 1867 prompted Andrews to change this; the ship was launched as Lady Alice Kenlis on 23 December 1867.

== Career ==
=== As the Lady Alice Kenlis ===
On 20 March 1868, it was registered to Andrews as a coaster in Belfast; its proposed trade was the movement of cattle, goods and passengers between Northern Ireland, Scotland and England. The ship was then briefly used as a ferry between Dundrum, County Down and Whitehaven, for Edward Henesey and Co and then for the East Downshire Steam Ship Co Ltd. After this it was sold to John Paley, situated in Preston, in 1875. In 1878 it was acquired by John Jackson and Co, which fitted a new 50 horsepower two-cylinder compound engine before re-registering the ship in 1883 and installing new boilers in 1889. Shortly after, the Lady Alice Kenlis was sold to Edward R Jones of Liverpool.

=== As the Holman Sutcliffe ===
The ship was sold to Sutcliffe & Co in 1908, and this company re-registered the ship as the Holman Sutcliffe in Boston, Lincolnshire. In 1913, it was sold to the Bristol Sand and Gravel Company and the ship was converted into a suction dredger before being re-registered in Bristol in 1918. It operated in the Bristol Channel until 1929 when it moved to the River Deben.

== Scuttling ==
By 1932 the ship was no longer registered. In the late 1930s or early 1940s its partially dismantled remains were towed across the Deben and scuttled. It remains in that position in the present day, though has largely been reclaimed by the river. In August 2023, the ship was granted protection by Historic England, which stated that the ship was "important in our understanding of early iron ships, and its relationship to the Cutty Sark offers an insight into Linton's evolution of thought."
