= Charodeika-class monitor =

Imperial Russian Navy's Charodeika-class monitors

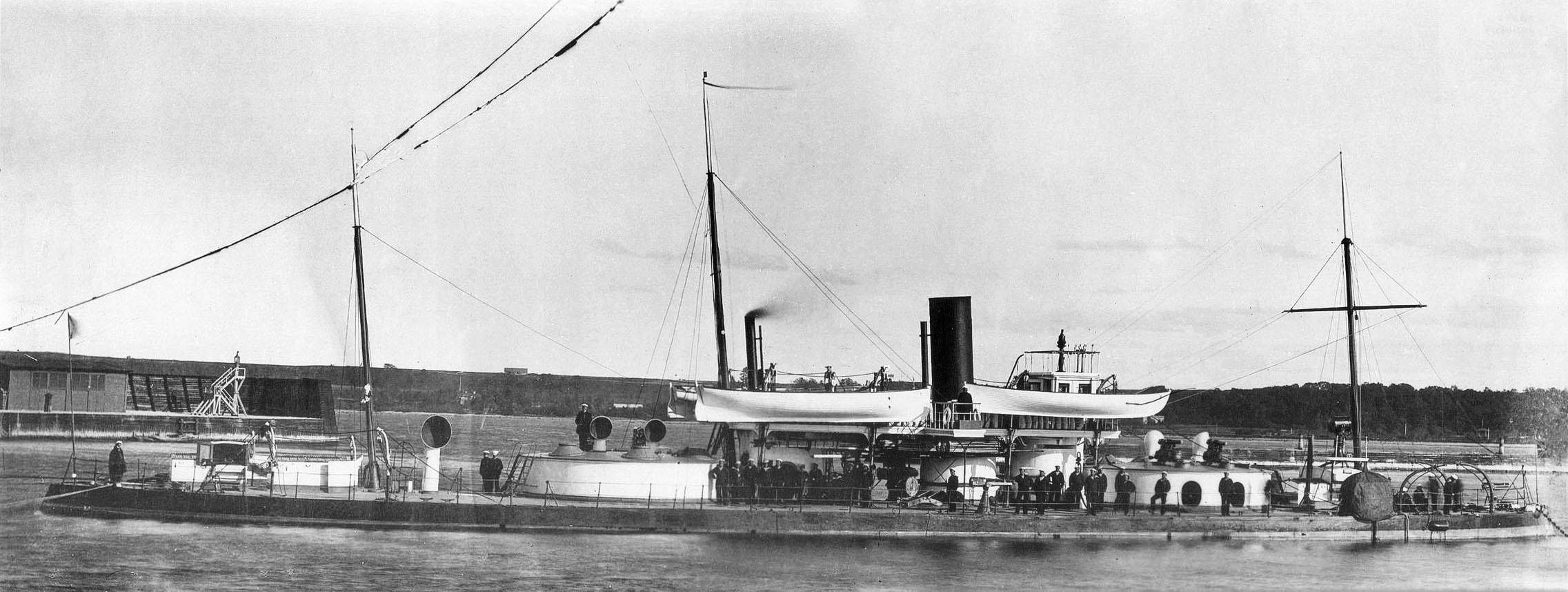
- Charodeika at anchor; her two turrets are painted white

Class overview
- Builders: Galernyi Island Shipyard, Saint Petersburg
- Operators: Imperial Russian Navy
- Preceded by: Smerch
- Succeeded by: Admiral Lazarev class
- Cost: 762,000 roubles
- Built: 1866–69
- In service: 1869–1907
- Completed: 2
- Lost: 1
- Scrapped: 1

General characteristics (as completed)
- Type: Monitor
- Displacement: 2,100 long tons (2,134 t)
- Length: 206 ft (62.8 m) (waterline)
- Beam: 42 ft (12.8 m)
- Draft: 12 ft 7 in (3.8 m)
- Installed power: 875 ihp (652 kW); 2 rectangular boilers
- Propulsion: 2 shafts, 2 Horizontal direct-action steam engines
- Speed: 8 knots (15 km/h; 9.2 mph)
- Complement: 13 officers and 171 crewmen (1877)
- Armament: 2 × 9-inch (229 mm) Smoothbore guns; 2 × 15-inch (381 mm) Rodman guns
- Armor: Belt: 3.25–4.5 in (83–114 mm); Gun turrets: 5.5 in (140 mm); Conning tower: 4.5 in (114 mm); Deck: 1 in (25 mm)

The Charodeika class was a pair of monitors built for the Imperial Russian Navy in the late 1860s. They were designed by the British shipbuilder Charles Mitchell and built in Saint Petersburg. Both ships were assigned to the Baltic Fleet and had fairly uneventful careers mostly assigned to training units. Rusalka struck a rock in 1869 and had to be run aground lest she sink. They were reclassified as coast-defense ironclads in 1892 and Rusalka sank during a storm in the Gulf of Finland the next year with the loss of all hands. Her sister ship Charodeika continued in service until 1907 and was eventually scrapped in 1911–12. Rusalka's wreck was discovered in 2003 by an expedition sponsored by the Estonian Maritime Museum.

== Design and description ==
By late 1863, the Russian Admiralty Board had begun planning for the second generation of ironclads to succeed those ships then under construction and issued a requirement on 12 November (Note: All dates used in this article are New Style) for a twin-screw low-freeboard ship that could sail throughout the Baltic Sea. It was to be armed with 15-inch (381 mm) smoothbore Dahlgren guns and protected by up to 6 in (152 mm) of armor. Before even deciding which designs to accept, the Admiralty decided to order eight ships of various types in March 1864. Charles Mitchell was allocated only one of the eight ships before he submitted four different designs for the competition in May–June. Two ships of his simplest design were awarded to a new builder, S. G. Kudriavtsev, who was provided facilities at the state-owned Galernyi Island Shipyard. In addition the Admiralty committed itself to furnishing the armament, armor, engines and boilers as well as a variety of smaller components for the two ships.

The Charodeika-class monitors were significantly larger than their predecessor, Smerch, and were 206 feet (62.8 m) long at the waterline. They had a beam of 42 feet (12.8 m) and a maximum draft of 12 feet 7 inches (3.8 m). The ships were designed to displace 1,882 long tons (1,912 t), but turned out to be overweight and actually displaced 2,100 long tons (2,100 t). They were fitted with a plough-shaped ram that projected four feet (1.2 m) forward of the bow. The Charodeikas were fitted with a double bottom and their hulls were subdivided by watertight bulkheads into 25 compartments. Their crew numbered 13 officers and 171 crewmen in 1877.

The ships had a freeboard of only two feet (0.6 m) and their decks were often awash in any sort of moderate sea. They rolled heavily and were very unmaneuverable, often not responding to the ship's wheel until 20 degrees of rudder was applied. The monitors were fitted with three iron pole masts, probably fore-and-aft rigged, and used to steady the ship rather than for propulsion.

=== Propulsion ===
The Charodeika class had two simple horizontal direct-acting steam engines, built by the Baird Works of Saint Petersburg. The engines had a bore of 38 inches (0.97 m) and a stroke of 18 inches (0.46 m) and each drove a single four-bladed 8-foot-6-inch (2.59 m) propeller. Steam was provided by two rectangular boilers at a pressure of 1.6 atm (162 kPa; 24 psi). The engines were designed to produce a total of 875 indicated horsepower (652 kW), but only produced 705–786 ihp (526–586 kW) which gave the ships speeds between 8.5–9 knots (15.7–16.7 km/h; 9.8–10.4 mph) when they ran their sea trials in 1869. The monitors also had a donkey boiler for the small steam engine that powered the ventilation fans and pumps. The Charodeika class carried a maximum of 250 long tons (254 t); their range, however, is unknown.

=== Armament ===
The monitors were designed to be armed with four Obukhov 9-inch (229 mm) rifled guns, a pair in each Coles-type turret. Various deckhouses and ventilation hatches prevented the turrets from firing directly forward or aft, so that each turret could bear approximately 150° to each side. Difficulties in manufacturing the guns and the delayed construction of the monitors themselves forced the Admiralty to change the armament to a pair of the 9-inch guns in the forward turret and a pair of 15-inch (380 mm) smoothbore muzzle-loading Rodman guns in the aft turret. These guns were replaced by another pair of 9-inch rifled guns beginning in 1871. They were replaced in their turn in 1878–79 by two longer, more powerful 9-inch Obukhov guns. The ship carried 75 rounds for each gun.

Light guns for use against torpedo boats are not known to have been fitted aboard the Charodeika-class ships before the 1870s when a variety of guns were added, although their numbers, calibers, and locations are only partially known. Charodeika received four 4-pounder 3.4-inch (86 mm) guns, two mounted on the roofs of each gun turret while Rusalka had a total of three guns with only one gun on her aft turret. Other guns known have been fitted included 45-millimeter (1.8 in) Engström quick-firing (QF) guns, 47-millimeter (1.9 in) QF Hotchkiss guns, 37-millimeter (1.5 in) QF Hotchkiss five-barreled revolving cannon, and 1-inch (25 mm) Nordenfelt guns.

=== Armor ===
The Charodeika-class monitors had a complete waterline belt of wrought iron that was 4.5 inches (114 mm) thick amidships and thinned to 3.25 inches (83 mm) aft and 3.75 inches (95 mm) forward. It was 7 feet 6 inches (2 m) high and completely covered the hull to 5 feet 6 inches (2 m) below the waterline. The armor was backed by 12 to 18 inches (305 to 457 mm) of teak. The turrets had 5.5 inches (140 mm) of armor, also backed by teak, and the conning tower was 4.5 inches thick. Amidships, the deck was 1 inch thick, although it thinned to 0.25–0.5 inches (6–13 mm) at the ends of the ship.

== Ships ==
Name	Namesake	Builder	Ordered	Laid down	Launched	Entered service
Charodeika	Sorceress	Galernyi Island Shipyard, St. Petersburg	26 January 1865	6 June 1866	12 September 1867	1869
Rusalka	Mermaid	Galernyi Island Shipyard, St. Petersburg	26 January 1865	6 June 1866	12 September 1867	1869

== Construction and service ==
The monitors were intended to be delivered by 27 May 1867, but construction was held up by delays in delivery of the blueprints, armor, changes made while under construction and the untimely death of Kudriavtsev in August 1865. The contract was transferred to Mitchell who completed them in 1869, two years after their scheduled delivery date for the cost of 762,000 roubles each. Both ships spent their entire careers with the Baltic Fleet. In June, Charodeika ripped a 28-foot (8.5 m) long hole in her hull when she struck an uncharted rock in the Gulf of Finland and had to be deliberately run aground to prevent her sinking. She was assigned to the Artillery Training Detachment of the Baltic Fleet in March 1870 and Charodeika was later assigned to the Mine (Torpedo) Training Detachment.

Both monitors were reclassified as coast-defense ironclads on 13 February 1892 and Rusalka sank in a storm on 7 September 1893 during a voyage between Reval (Tallinn) and Helsingfors (Helsinki) with the loss of her entire crew of 177 officers and enlisted men. Despite an extensive search, the only traces of her found were one body and some debris that washed ashore. Charodeika remained in service until 31 March 1907 when she was turned over to the Port of Kronstadt for disposal. The ship was stricken from the Navy List on 7 April and was finally scrapped in 1911–12.

Rusalka's wreck was discovered on 22 July 2003 in the Gulf of Finland, 25 kilometers (13 nmi) south of Helsinki, by a joint expedition of the Estonian Maritime Museum and the commercial diving company Tuukritööde OÜ. The wreck is generally intact although draped with snagged fishing nets. The aft turret, however, has fallen out of the ship.

== See also ==
- List of ironclads of Russia

== Bibliography ==
- Chesneau, Roger & Kolesnik, Eugene M., eds. (1979). Conway's All the World's Fighting Ships 1860–1905. Greenwich, UK: Conway Maritime Press. ISBN 0-8317-0302-4.
- McLaughlin, Stephen (2013). "Russia's Coles 'Monitors': Smerch, Rusalka and Charodeika". In Jordan, John (ed.). Warship 2013. London: Conway. pp. 149–63. ISBN 978-1-84486-205-4.
- "Russian Monitors and Coast Defense Ships". Warship International. IX (3). Toledo, Ohio: Naval Records Club: 304–05. 1972. ISSN 0043-0374.
- Silverstone, Paul H. (1984). Directory of the World's Capital Ships. New York: Hippocrene Books. ISBN 0-88254-979-0.
- Watts, Anthony J. (1990). The Imperial Russian Navy. London: Arms and Armour. ISBN 0-85368-912-1.
