= Manistee (shipwreck) =

Packet steamer that disappeared on Lake Superior

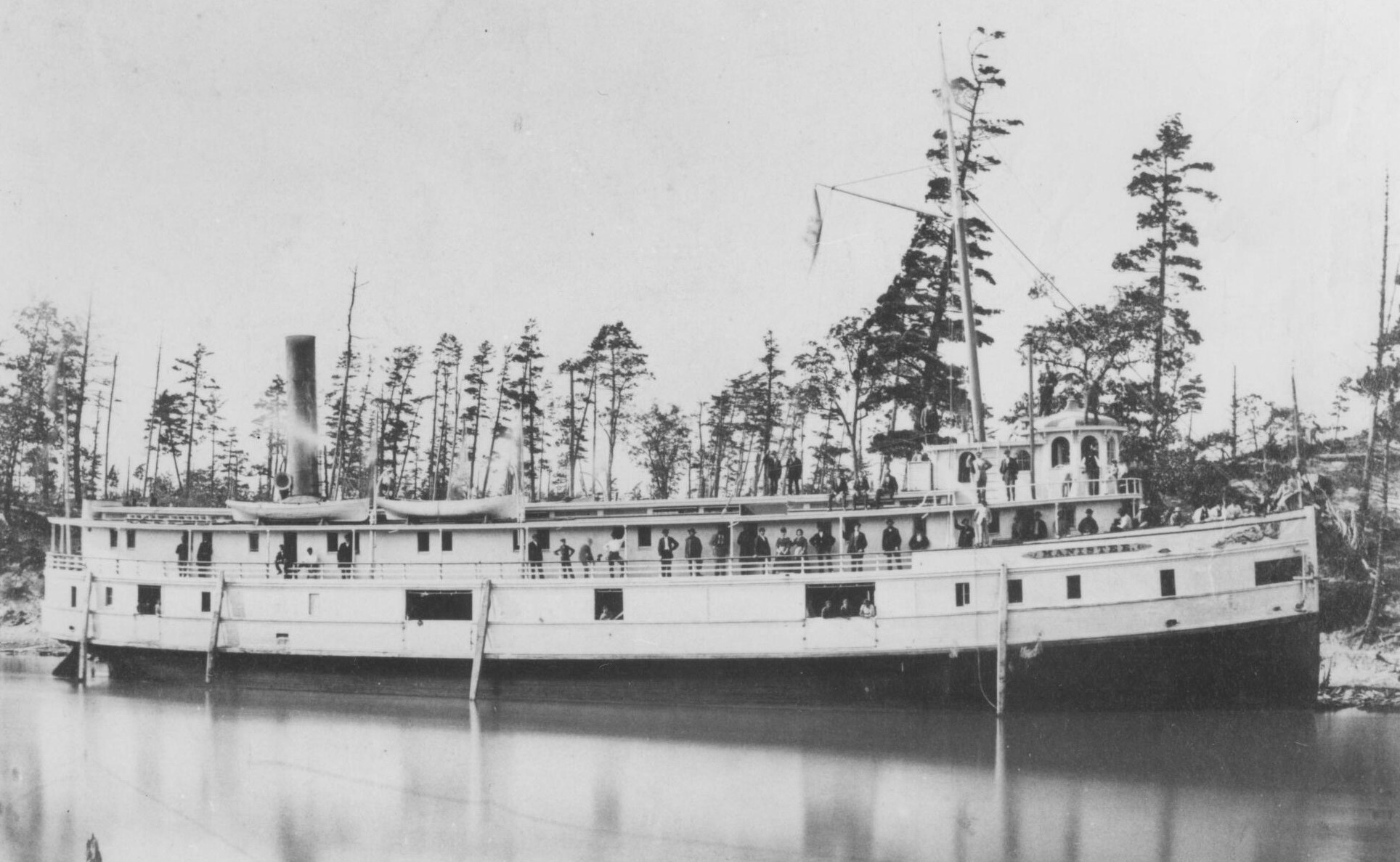
- The Manistee prior to her sinking

History

United States
- Name: Manistee
- Namesake: Manistee, Michigan
- Owner: Originally Engelman Line, Milwaukee, Wisconsin; Later Leopold and Austrian Line
- Port of registry: United States
- Builder: E. M. Peck, Cleveland, Ohio
- Laid down: 1867
- Launched: 1867
- Fate: Disappeared November 10, 1883

General characteristics
- Type: Packet steamer
- Tonnage: 677 GRT
- Length: 154 feet (47 m), later extended to 184 feet (56 m)
- Crew: About 23

Manistee was a packet steamer that disappeared on Lake Superior on November 15 or 16, 1883. She was presumed to have sunk, with no surviving crew or passengers. The cause remains a mystery, and her wreckage has not been found.

== History ==
Manistee was built in 1867 by E. M. Peck Shipbuilders, of Cleveland, Ohio. Originally, she measured 154 feet (47 m) in length, but she was later lengthened to 184 feet (56 m), and she was rated at 677 gross register tons.

Originally, the vessel was operated by the Engelman Line and carried cargo and passengers between her home port of Milwaukee, Wisconsin, and her namesake city, Manistee, Michigan. In 1872, the ship came to Duluth, Minnesota, and she eventually was put in service for the Leopold and Austrian Line, her final owners.

The long and interesting career of Manistee came to an end on an autumn Saturday in 1883, when the ship left Duluth for Ontonagon, Michigan. The 400 tons of cargo included items such as flour, mill goods, furniture, and general merchandise. Shortly after she left Duluth, a violent northwest gale developed on the western portion of Lake Superior. Her captain, John McKay, decided to seek temporary shelter near Bayfield, Wisconsin, until the winds subsided. The storm lasted for four days. On the fifth day of his Bayfield stay, McKay decided to venture back out towards Ontonagon. However, this proved to be a mistake, as the ship disappeared somewhere near the Apostle Islands after leaving Bayfield.

The cause of the sinking, the location of the wreck, and even the exact number of missing passengers is in question. Different theories as to the ship's fate were discussed in an article in the Bayfield County Press on November 24, 1883, when the story was first reported by the local media.

== See also ==
- List of shipwrecks in the Great Lakes
