= Ella Moore =

1867 Canadian barque

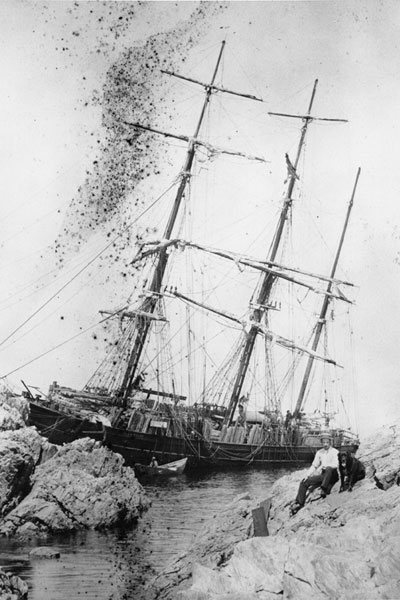
- Ella Moore stranded near Canso, Nova Scotia on 1 July 1892

History

Canada
- Name: Ella Moore (1867-1907)
- Owner: D.B. & C.F. Eaton
- Port of registry: Canada, Windsor, Nova Scotia
- Route: North Atlantic
- Completed: 1867
- Acquired: 1867
- Maiden voyage: 1867
- In service: 1867
- Out of service: 1907
- Identification: WRBH; 57191
- Fate: Scrapped 1907

General characteristics
- Type: Barque
- Tonnage: 391 GRT
- Length: 41.5 metres (136 ft 2 in)
- Beam: 9.2 metres (30 ft 2 in)
- Depth: 4.5 metres (14 ft 9 in)
- Propulsion: Sails
- Sail plan: 3 masts

Ella Moore was a Canadian barque that enjoyed a long career sailing the North Atlantic and survived many storms and even a grounding in 1892 before being scrapped in 1907.

== Construction ==
Ella Moore was built in Halls Harbour, Nova Scotia, Canada, for the D.B. & C.F. Eaton of Cornwallis company. She was completed 1867 and was at the time one of the largest vessels built in Halls Harbour. The ship was 41.5 metres (136 ft 2 in) long, had a beam of 9.2 metres (30 ft 2 in), and had a depth of 4.5 metres (14 ft 9 in). She was assessed at 391 GRT and had three masts.

== Career ==
Ella Moore enjoyed a long career on the North Atlantic, where she survived a number of severe storms that lightly damaged her. She also made some fast passages, including a voyage in 1881 from Eatonville, Nova Scotia, to Belfast, Ireland, and back with a cargo of lumber which she made in only two months.

Ella Moore ran aground on rocks near Canso, Nova Scotia, with a cargo of railroad ties. Despite her precarious position, she was refloated, repaired, and returned to service later that year.

== Final disposition ==
Ella Moore was scrapped in 1907. She had sailed the North Atlantic for 40 years before her retirement.
