= List of ship launches in 1836 =

The list of ship launches in 1836 includes a chronological list of some ships launched in 1836.

Date	Ship	Class	Builder	Location	Country	Notes
January	Adolphus	Snow	T. Reed	Sunderland	United Kingdom	For Mr. Scurfield.
January	Ærial	Barque	J. Carr	Sunderland	United Kingdom	For private owner.
January	Conservative	Merchantman		Sunderland	United Kingdom	For Mr. Hutchinson.
January	Courier	Snow	John M. Gales	Sunderland	United Kingdom	For John M. Gales.
January	Teresa	Merchantman		Sunderland	United Kingdom	For Main & Co.
January	William Watson	Merchantman	Joseph Helmsley	Sunderland	United Kingdom	For Mr Watson.
17 February	Néréide	Frigate		Lorient	France	For French Navy.
19 February	Walmer Castle	East Indiaman	George Green	Blackwall	United Kingdom	For private owner.
20 February	Rob Roy	Steamship	Edward Gibson	Hull	United Kingdom	For Messrs. Gee & Co.
22 February	The Brigand	Brigantine	Charles Connell & Sons	Belfast	United Kingdom	For Charles & Daniel Davis.
7 March	Integrity	Schooner	H. Jones	Port Madoc	United Kingdom	For private owners.
9 March	Columbia	Raritan-class frigate		Washington Navy Yard	United States	For United States Navy.
17 March	Daphné	Schooner		Lorient	France	For French Navy.
18 March	Harlequin	Racer-class brig-sloop		Pembroke Dockyard	United Kingdom	For Royal Navy.
21 March	Levrette	Iris-class schooner		Lorient	France	For French Navy.
March	Jubilee	Snow	William Gales	Sunderland	United Kingdom	For Gales & Co.
March	Sheraton	Schooner	Robert Reay	Sunderland	United Kingdom	For Mr. Sheraton.
2 April	Jemmapes	Hercule-class ship of the line		Lorient	France	For French Navy.
4 April	Bat	Yacht hoy		Chatham Dockyard	United Kingdom	For Royal Navy.
5 April	Bonetta	Pandora-class sloop		Sheerness Dockyard	United Kingdom	For Royal Navy.
16 April	Niagara	Barque	J. Watson	Sunderland	United Kingdom	For Mr. Greenwell.
20 April	D'Arcy	Merchantman	W. Chilton	Sunderland	United Kingdom	For J. C. Carr.
21 April	The Letitia	Schooner	William Bailey	Ipswich	United Kingdom	Forprivate owner.
30 April	True Bess	Smack	Jenkins	Carmarthen	United Kingdom	For George Morgan.
April	David	Brigantine		Saint John	(United Kingdom of Great Britain and Ireland) Colony of New Brunswick	For private owner.
April	Protector	Barque	J. Storey	Sunderland	United Kingdom	For .J. Storey
April	Sally	Barque		Glasgow	(United Kingdom of Great Britain and Ireland) Colony of Nova Scotia	For private owner.
April	Thomas Hunter	Barque	W. Wilkinson	Sunderland	United Kingdom	For Thomas Hunter.
3 May	London	Paddle steamer	J. Wood	Hull	United Kingdom	For private owner.
14 May	Prince George	Steamship	Wallis & Co	Blackwall	United Kingdom	For Commercial Steam Packet Company.
31 May	Porpoise	Dolphin-class brig			United States	For United States Navy.
31 May	The Lancashire Lass	Schooner	Rye & Harris	Ilfracombe	United Kingdom	For John Norman.
31 May	Union	Steamship	Smith	Gainsborough	United Kingdom	For private owner.
May	Favourite	Full-rigged ship		Quebec	(United Kingdom of Great Britain and Ireland) Upper Canada	For private owner.
May	Harriett Scott	Full-rigged ship			United Kingdom	For private owner.
May	Jane and Magaret	Barque	John Jardine	Richibucto	(United Kingdom of Great Britain and Ireland) Colony of New Brunswick	For private owner.
May	Unicorn	Paddle steamer	Robert Steele & Company.	Greenock	United Kingdom	For British and North American Royal Mail Steam Packet Company.
1 June	Eliza Price	Steamship	Messrs. Laird	Birkenhead	United Kingdom	For Woodside Ferry Company.
2 June	Atalanta	Steamship	White	Cowes	United Kingdom	For private owner.
2 June	Maid of Galloway	Steamship		Glasgow	United Kingdom	For private owner.
7 June	Royal William	Steamship	Messrs. Wilson	Belfast	United Kingdom	For City of Dublin Steam Packet Company.
13 June	Dido	Daphne-class corvette		Pembroke Dockyard	United Kingdom	For Royal Navy.
14 June	Dolphin	Brigantine		Sheerness Dockyard	United Kingdom	For Royal Navy.
16 June	Inconstant	Fifth rate	Hayes	Portsmouth Dockyard	United Kingdom	For Royal Navy.
17 June	Dolphin	Dolphin-class brig		New York Navy Yard	United States	For United States Navy.
18 June	Duchess of Kent	Steamship	Wallis & Co	Blackwall	United Kingdom	For Commercial Steam Packet Company.
21 June	Clipper	Schooner	Messrs. A. Palmer & Son	Great Yarmouth	United Kingdom	For W. S. Palmer.
27 June	Keldy Castle	Merchantman	Alcock	Sunderland	United Kingdom	For Robert Liddell.
30 June	Ardaseer	Opium clipper		Bombay Dockyard	India	For Cerssetjee Cowasjee.
30 June	Sirius	Steamship	Menzies & Son	Leith	United Kingdom	For St George Steam Packet Company.
30 June	Vulcano	Paddle sloop		Portsmouth Dockyard	United Kingdom	For Royal Navy.
June	Elizabeth	Schooner	Messrs. E. Evans and John Pritchard	Caernarfon	United Kingdom	For private owner.
June	Hope	Schooner			United Kingdom	For private owner
June	Vernal	Snow	John M. Gales	Sunderland	United Kingdom	For Potts & Co.
June	Welsh Lass	Merchantman	Messrs. E. Evan and John Pritchard	Caernarfon	United Kingdom	For private owner.
1 July	Ocean	Steamship	Fletcher & Fearnall	Limehouse	United Kingdom	For General Steam Navigation Company.
7 July	Elisabeth	Barque	W. R. & J. Tindall	Scarborough	United Kingdom	For Messrs. Samuel Smith & Co.
28 July	Sarah Nicholson	Snow	George Frater & Co.	Sunderland	United Kingdom	For Mr. Nicholson.
28 July	Vernon	Brig	Messrs. Campion & Co.	Whitby	United Kingdom	For John Park.
29 July	Hercule	Hercule-class ship of the line		Toulon	France	For French Navy.
30 July	City of London	West Indiaman	Bailey	Shoreham-by-Sea	United Kingdom	For Mr. Walker.
July	Ariel	Yacht	James Mason	Hull	United Kingdom	For private owner.
July	Cove	Merchantman	J. Carr	Southwick	United Kingdom	For G. Palmer.
July	John Cock	Barque			(United Kingdom of Great Britain and Ireland) Colony of New Brunswick	For private owner.
July	Squirrel	Brig			(United Kingdom of Great Britain and Ireland) Colony of Nova Scotia	For private owner.
July	Wisbeach	Merchantman	Peter Austin	Sunderland	United Kingdom	For Stevens & Co.
1 August	Whitby	Merchantman	Messrs. Campion & Co.	Whitby	United Kingdom	For Messrs. Wilkinson & Co.
6 August	Eagle	Steamship	Messrs. McFarlane & Co	Aberdeen	United Kingdom	For private owner.
12 August	Carysfort	Sixth rate		Pembroke Dockyard	United Kingdom	For Royal Navy.
13 August	Daring	Schooner	Joseph White	Cowes	United Kingdom	For Mr. Ratsey.
15 August	Mary Worrall	Barque	W. Perkins	Newport	United Kingdom	For John Worrall.
16 August	Clarence	Steamship	Green, Wigram & Green	Blackwall	United Kingdom	For General Steam Navigation Company.
16 August	Euphemia	Brig	Messrs. Read & Page	Ipswich	United Kingdom	For private owner.
26 August	Doris	Iris-class schooner		Saint-Malo	France	For French Navy.
26 August	Fine	Iris-class schooner		Saint-Malo	France	For French Navy.
27 August	Sésostris	Paddle steamer		Cherbourg	France	For Compagnie des Messageries Maritimes.
29 August	Ann	Brig	John Johns	Newport	United Kingdom	For thomas Powell.
29 August	Cremill	Yacht hoy		Pembroke Dockyard	United Kingdom	For Royal Navy.
30 August	Actress	Full-rigged ship		Saint John	(United Kingdom of Great Britain and Ireland) Colony of New Brunswick	For private owner.
August	Defence	Merchantman	Oliver	Sunderland	United Kingdom	For Mr. Oliver.
August	Mayoress	Schooner	T. Reed	Sunderland	United Kingdom	For Mr. Mallaburn.
August	Vernon	Brig			United Kingdom	For private owner.
August	Wensleydale	Merchantman	S. & P. Mills	Sunderland	United Kingdom	For Ogden & Co.
10 September	Don Juan	Steamship	Fletcher & Fearnall	Limehouse	United Kingdom	For P&O.
14 September	Porcupine	Schooner	Bailey	Shoreham-by-Sea	United Kingdom	For private owner.
14 September	Relief	Supply ship		Philadelphia Navy Yard	United States	For United States Navy.
21 September	Roscommon	Steamship	Messrs. Wilson	Liverpool	United Kingdom	For City of Dublin Steam Packet Company.
24 September	Braganza	Steamship	Fletcher & Fearnall	Limehouse	United Kingdom	For General Steam Navigation Company.
13 October	Wolverine	Racer-class brig-sloop		Chatham Dockyard	United Kingdom	For Royal Navy.
15 October	Beech	Merchantman	Robert Russell & Sons	Woodside	United Kingdom	For Liverpool and Manchester Timber Carrying Company.
15 October	Birch	Merchantman	Robert Russell & Sons	Woodside	United Kingdom	For Liverpool and Manchester Timber Carrying Company.
15 October	Cedar	Merchantman	Robert Russell & Sons	Woodside	United Kingdom	For Liverpool and Manchester Timber Carrying Company.
15 October	Elm	Merchantman	Robert Russell & Sons	Woodside	United Kingdom	For Liverpool and Manchester Timber Carrying Company.
15 October	Maple	Merchantman	Robert Russell & Sons	Woodside	United Kingdom	For Liverpool and Manchester Timber Carrying Company.
15 October	Pine	Merchantman	Robert Russell & Sons	Woodside	United Kingdom	For Liverpool and Manchester Timber Carrying Company.
24 October	Salmon	Smack	Christopher Heyes Jr.	Liverpool	United Kingdom	For Liverpool Fish Company.
24 October	Sole	Smack	Christopher Heyes Jr.	Liverpool	United Kingdom	For Liverpool Fish Company.
24 October	Turbot	Smack	Christopher Heyes Jr.	Liverpool	United Kingdom	For Liverpool Fish Company.
26 October	Celerity	Smack	Messrs. Read & Page	Ipswich	United Kingdom	For James Morgan.
26 October	The Tobermory	Steamship	John Scott & Sons	Greenock	United Kingdom	For private owner.
27 October	Gipsy	Schooner		Sheerness Dockyard	United Kingdom	For Royal Navy.
29 October	Bravo	Brig	Frederick Preston	Great Yarmouth	United Kingdom	For Messrs. Gee & Co.
31 October	Sultan Makhmud	Sultan Makhmud-class ship of the line	V. Apostoli	Nicholaieff	Russia	For Imperial Russian Navy.
October	Hespa	Merchantman	J. T. & C. Alcock	Sunderland	United Kingdom	For J. Watson.
10 November	Lady Williamson	Merchantman	George Frater & Co.	Sunderland	United Kingdom	For private owner.
23 November	Crusader	Schooner	Joseph White	Cowes	United Kingdom	For Robert Meiklam.
November	Kent	Snow	Peter Austin	Sunderland	United Kingdom	For Austin & Co.
November	Martin	Merchantman	T. Cairncross	Sunderland	United Kingdom	For Mr. Thompson.
9 December	Elizabeth & Catherine	Sloop	Edward Ellis	Garth	United Kingdom	For private owners.
10 December	Earl of Harewood	Barque	William Gibson	location	United Kingdom	For John Lascelles.
15 December	Watch House	Merchantman	White	Cowes	United Kingdom	For private owner.
22 December	Sheridan	Packet ship		New York	United States	For private owner.
December	Gordon	Snow		Sunderland	United Kingdom	For private owner.
December	Ocean	Barque		Saint John	(United Kingdom of Great Britain and Ireland) Colony of New Brunswick	For private owner.
December	Sisters	Schooner			United Kingdom	For John White.
Unknown date	Albion	Merchantman	Kirkbride & Co	Sunderland	United Kingdom	For Mr. Fenwick.
Unknown date	Albyn	Barque	W. Adamson	Sunderland	United Kingdom	For W. Adamson.
Unknown date	Asp	Schooner	Schott & Whitney	Baltimore, Maryland	United States	For private owner.
Unknown date	Auckland	Snow	T. Ogden	Sunderland	United Kingdom	For private owner.
Unknown date	Barbara Gordon	Barque		Sunderland	United Kingdom	For Gordon & Co.
Unknown date	Berkshire	Merchantman	William Gales	Hylton	United Kingdom	For private owner.
Unknown date	Cambyses	Brig	Laing & Simey	Sunderland	United Kingdom	For Mr. Wilkinson.
Unknown date	Charleston	Paddle steamer	John Vaughan & Son		United States	For private owner.
Unknown date	Chatham	Paddle steamer	John Laird, Sons & Co.	Birkenhead	United Kingdom	For private owner.
Unknown date	Clonmel	Paddle steamer		Birkenhead	United Kingdom	For private owner.
Unknown date	Consort	Full-rigged ship			United States	For United States Navy.
Unknown date	Countess of Lonsdale	Steamship			United Kingdom	For General Steam Navigation Company.
Unknown date	Cyclops	Yacht	James Macnair	Drymen	United Kingdom	For James Macnair. Claimed by Macnair to be the first iron-hulled ship built for the open sea.
Unknown date	Defender	Barque	J. Storey	Sunderland	United Kingdom	For J. Storey.
Unknown date	Dorothy Gales	Barque	John M. Gales	Sunderland	United Kingdom	For John M. Gales.
Unknown date	Emma	Snow	Joseph Helmsley	Sunderland	United Kingdom	For Mr. Usherwood.
Unknown date	Empress	Merchantman	J. Hutchinson	Sunderland	United Kingdom	For Mr. Hutchinson.
Unknown date	Esther	Snow		Sunderland	United Kingdom	For Main & Co.
Unknown date	Fawn	Schooner	Stephenson & Stuart	Sunderland	United Kingdom	For Mr. Stephenson.
Unknown date	Fevziye	Second rate		İzmit	Ottoman Empire	For Ottoman Navy.
Unknown date	Fox	Schooner	John Ball Jr.	Salcombe	United Kingdom	For Richard and Thomas Fox.
Unknown date	Galatea	Merchantman	Peter Austin	Sunderland	United Kingdom	For J. Ness.
Unknown date	Gateshead Park	Snow	J. Crown	Sunderland	United Kingdom	For Abbott & Co.
Unknown date	George & May	Snow	W. Wilkinson	Sunderland	United Kingdom	For Mr. Morrison.
Unknown date	Globe	Barque	James Leithead	Sunderland	United Kingdom	For W. Ord.
Unknown date	Harmony	Snow		Sunderland	United Kingdom	For Watson & Co.
Unknown date	Harriet	Merchantman		Great Yarmouth	United Kingdom	For Joseph Somes.
Unknown date	Hartley	Barque	E. Brown	Sunderland	United Kingdom	For J. Panton.
Unknown date	Home	Paddle steamer	Allaire Works	New York City	United States	For Red Bank Line.
Unknown date	Honduras	Barque		Sunderland	United Kingdom	For Weller & Co.
Unknown date	Indus	Steamship			United Kingdom	For private owner.
Unknown date	James Cooke	Merchantman	Laing & Simey	Sunderland	United Kingdom	For Spaight & Co.
Unknown date	Jessie	Snow		Sunderland	United Kingdom	For private owner.
Unknown date	John Fleming	Full-rigged ship		Bombay	India	For private owner.
Unknown date	Leadbitter	Merchantman	George Frater & Col	Sunderland	United Kingdom	For Mr. Leadbitter.
Unknown date	Leonora	Full-rigged ship		Sunderland	United Kingdom	For Mr. Sandbach.
Unknown date	Lipton	Snow		Sunderland	United Kingdom	For William Potts.
Unknown date	Lord Brougham	Merchantman	T. Reed	Sunderland	United Kingdom	For Lord Brougham and Vaux.
Unknown date	Macedonian	Frigate		Gosport Navy Yard	United States	For United States Navy.
Unknown date	Malta	Merchantman	J. & G. Mills	Sunderland	United Kingdom	For Andrew & Richard White.
Unknown date	Maria	Barque		Great Yarmouth	United Kingdom	For Joseph Somes.
Unknown date	Maria Hardy	Merchantman	Laing & Simey	Sunderland	United Kingdom	For P. Laing & Co.
Unknown date	Mary	Merchantman	Laing & Simey	Sunderland	United Kingdom	For private owner.
Unknown date	Mary & Catherine	Barque		Deptford	United Kingdom	For Mr. Arthur.
Unknown date	Mayor	Snow	T. & W. Dixon	Sunderland	United Kingdom	For Mr. Thompson.
Unknown date	Meg Merrilees	Full-rigged ship		Sunderland	United Kingdom	For private owner.
Unknown date	Megna	Brig		Bombay	India	For Bombay Pilot Service.
Unknown date	Midge	Schooner	James Leithead	Sunderland	United Kingdom	For private owner.
Unknown date	Milvill	Brig		Sunderland	United Kingdom	For Mr. Burrell.
Unknown date	Neptune	Merchantman		Chepstow	United Kingdom	For John Irving.
Unknown date	New York	Paddle steamer	Lawrence & Sneden	Manhattan, New York	United States	For New Haven Steamboat Co.
Unknown date	Ocean	Paddle steamer	Mottershead & Heyes	Liverpool	United Kingdom	For St George Steam Packet Company.
Unknown date	Palmer	Snow		Sunderland	United Kingdom	For G. Palmer.
Unknown date	Pallas	Merchantman	E. Brown	Sunderland	United Kingdom	For private owner.
Unknown date	Pomona	Merchantman	E. Brown	Hylton	United Kingdom	For Mr. Glaholm.
Unknown date	Proof	Full-rigged ship	Reay	Walker	United Kingdom	For Matthew Popplewell.
Unknown date	Princess Victoria	Schooner		Redbridge	United Kingdom	For private owner.
Unknown date	Radical	Snow	T. Cairncross	Sunderland	United Kingdom	For R. French.
Unknown date	Rocket	Snow	Kirkbride & partners	Sunderland	United Kingdom	For R. Ord.
Unknown date	Ruby	Paddle steamer	Wallis		United Kingdom	For Diamond Steam Packet Co.
Unknown date	Saugor	Brig		Bombay	India	For Bombay Pilot Service.
Unknown date	Sceptre	Merchantman	John M. Gales	Hylton	United Kingdom	For Mr Mitcheson.
Unknown date	Scorpion	Schooner	Schott & Whitney	Baltimore, Maryland	United States	For private owner.
Unknown date	Triton	Snow	Kirkbride & partners	Sunderland	United Kingdom	For Mr. Fenwick.
Unknown date	Ulysses	Barque	J. Watson	Sunderland	United Kingdom	For T. Pratt.
Unknown date	Valparaiso	Baltimore clipper		Baltimore, Maryland	United States	For private owner.
Unknown date	Vesper	Paddle steamer	Fletcher	Limehouse	United Kingdom	For .
Unknown date	Viper	Schooner	Schott & Whitney	Baltimore, Maryland	United States	For private owner.
Unknown date	Volusia	Schooner	John Ball Jr.	Salcombe	United Kingdom	For Henry Grant & others.
Unknown date	Zenobia	Full-rigged ship	J. Stetson	Medford, Massachusetts	United States	For private owner.
