= Bengal (ship) =

Several vessels have been named Bengal.

- Bengal (1815 ship) was launched at Greenock in 1815. She immediately made three voyages to India, sailing under a licence from the British East India Company (EIC). She then traded with the United States, alternating that with other voyages to India. In 1819, on one voyage to India, she was anchored at Calcutta and the venue for a party that resulted in her captain, surgeon, and about a fifth of the guests all dying within days of an unknown disease. She was wrecked in about 1847.
- Bengal (1816 ship), of 300 or 304 tons (bm), was launched at Salem, Massachusetts in 1816. (Note: One source reports that Bengal, of 300 tons (bm), was launched at Salem in 1813 as an East Indiaman and taken in prize that same year. British owners acquired her and retained her name. However, Bengal did not appear in Lloyd's Register until she returned to American ownership circa 1821.) Between 1821 and 1829 she appeared in Lloyd's Register as being owned in America, but sailing between Cowes and Batavia. Between 1832 and 1844 she made four voyages from Salem as a whaler. She then moved to New London, Connecticut and made three more voyages as a whaler. She was sold in 1856, rebuilt, and renamed North West. She then made two more voyages as a whaler. On 6 April 1863 she was sold at Mauritius.

== See also ==
- Bengal (East Indiaman) – one of at least two vessels by that name that sailed for the British East India Company (EIC).
- HMIS Bengal (J243) was a Bathurst-class corvette of the Royal Indian Navy (RIN) that served during the Second World War.
- Bengal Merchant – one of at least three vessels of that name
