= List of shipwrecks in April 1851 =

The list of shipwrecks in April 1851 includes ships sunk, foundered, wrecked, grounded, or otherwise lost during April 1851.

== 1 April ==
List of shipwrecks: 1 April 1851
Ship	State	Description
Asee	France	The barque was driven ashore and severely damaged at San Francisco, California, United States.
Caterina	United Kingdom	The ship was driven ashore near "Cape St. Angelo". She was on a voyage from Galaţi, Ottoman Empire to Falmouth, Cornwall or Queenstown, County Cork.
Delia Walker	United Kingdom	The full-rigged ship was driven ashore and severely damaged at San Francisco.
Eight Sons	(United Kingdom of Great Britain and Ireland) British North America	The ship was lost whilst on a voyage from Boston, Massachusetts to "Lagua la Grande".
Emile	France	The ship struck the Grand Veinetière Rock and sank. Her crew were rescued. She was on a voyage from Pont-l'Abbé, Finistère to Plymouth, Devon, United Kingdom.
Gustav I	Belgium	The ship was driven ashore and wrecked on Cape Sable Island, Nova Scotia, British North America. She was on a voyage from Havana, Cuba to Antwerp.
Infanta	United Kingdom	The ship was driven ashore at Quogue, New York, United States. She was on a voyage from Liverpool, Lancashire to Halifax, Nova Scotia, British North America and New York City. She was refloated and towed in to New York City.
Vivid	United Kingdom	The schooner was in collision with the full-rigged ship Atlantic (United States) and sank in the English Channel off St. Catherine's Point, Isle of Wight. Her crew were rescued. She was on a voyage from Hull, Yorkshire to the Isles of Scilly.

== 2 April ==
List of shipwrecks: 2 April 1851
Ship	State	Description
Asia	United Kingdom	The barque was sighted in the Atlantic Ocean whilst on a voyage from Callao, Peru to an English port. No further trace, presumed foundered with the loss of all hands.
Blythswood	United Kingdom	The ship was abandoned off Réunion. Her crew were rescued. She was on a voyage from Calcutta, India to Liverpool, Lancashire.
Flying Fish	United Kingdom	The ship ran aground at Poole, Dorset. She was on a voyage from London to Galaţi, Ottoman Empire. She was refloated the next day and resumed her voyage.
Proven	(Denmark) Duchy of Schleswig	The ship was wrecked at the mouth of the Eider. Her crew were rescued. She was on a voyage from Grangemouth, Stirlingshire, United Kingdom to Rendsburg.

== 3 April ==
List of shipwrecks: 3 April 1851
Ship	State	Description
Haabet	Denmark	The ship was driven ashore and wrecked near Nexø. Her crew were rescued.
Liffey	United Kingdom	The schooner ran aground on the Kimmeridge Ledge, off the coast of Dorset. She was on a voyage from London to Madeira. She was refloated on 13 April.
Novelty	United Kingdom	The ship ran aground on the Tonquin Shoals, off the coast of California, United States. She was on a voyage from Auckland, New Zealand to San Francisco, California. She was refloated and taken in to San Francisco in a leaky condition.

== 4 April ==
List of shipwrecks: 4 April 1851
Ship	State	Description
Diligence	Netherlands	The ship ran aground on the Cork Sand, in the North Sea off the coast of Suffolk, United Kingdom. She was on a voyage from Amsterdam, North Holland to Batavia, Netherlands East Indies. She was refloated and taken in to Harwich, Essex, United Kingdom in a leaky condition.
Gustave Sophia	Denmark	The schooner was driven ashore north of Møn. She was refloated.
Lord Stanley	United Kingdom	The ship was wrecked in the Paracel Islands. Her crew were rescued. She was on a voyage from Hong Kong to Singapore.
Union	Bremen	The ship ran aground off Helsingør, Denmark. She was refloated.

== 5 April ==
List of shipwrecks: 5 April 1851
Ship	State	Description
Bastide	France	The ship sank at Port-Louis, Morbihan. Her crew were rescued. She was on a voyage from Nantes, Loire-Inférieure to Hennebont, Morbihan.
City of Limerick	United Kingdom	The schooner ran aground on the Jordon Flats, in Liverpool Bay. She was refloated and resumed her voyage.
Dygden	(Russian Empire) Grand Duchy of Finland	The ship ran aground off Helsingør, Denmark. She was on a voyage from Cádiz, Spain to Turku. She was refloated and resumed her voyage.
Emilie	France	The barque was wrecked on Acklins Island, Bahamas. She was on a voyage from the Rio de la Hacha to Havre de Grâce, Seine-Inférieure.
Harmony	United Kingdom	The brig ran aground on the Jordon Flats. She was refloated and resumed her voyage.
Neptune	United Kingdom	The steamship ran aground on the North Bank, in Liverpool Bay. She was on a voyage from Liverpool, Lancashire to Belfast, County Antrim. She was refloated the next day.
Pax	Kingdom of Hanover	The brig ran aground at Falmouth, Jamaica. She was refloated on 7 April and placed under repair.

== 6 April ==
List of shipwrecks: 6 April 1851
Ship	State	Description
Ferdinand	France	The ship struck the Jument Rock, off Ouessant, Finistère and sank. Her crew were rescued. She was on a voyage from Bordeaux, Gironde to Lübeck.
Jane Mary	United Kingdom	The ship struck the Cruggy Rock, in the River Severn and sank. She was on a voyage from Gloucester to Cardiff, Glamorgan.

== 7 April ==
List of shipwrecks: 7 April 1851
Ship	State	Description
Confidence	United Kingdom	The ship ran aground on the Swine Bottoms, in the Baltic Sea off the coast of Denmark. She was on a voyage from Swinemünde, Prussia to Newcastle upon Tyne, Northumberland.
Emali	Belgium	The ship was wrecked on the Assombe Bank. She was on a voyage from Cette, Hérault, France to New York, United States.
Kurrimany	India	The East Indiaman was destroyed by fire at the Sand Heads, in the Hooghly River with the loss of 368 of the 465 people on board. Survivors were rescued by Futta Moubaruck ( India), Rattler, Royal Albert and Union (all United Kingdom). The fire was arson by some of the crew. Kurrimany was on a voyage from Calcutta to Mauritius.
Madge Wildfire	(United Kingdom of Great Britain and Ireland) New South Wales	The schooner was lost in the Richmond River with the loss of all hands.

== 8 April ==
List of shipwrecks: 8 April 1851
Ship	State	Description
Ansdale	United Kingdom	The ship ran aground on the Hen and Chickens Shoals. She was on a voyage from Halifax, Nova Scotia to Saint John, New Brunswick, British North America.
Crown	(United Kingdom of Great Britain and Ireland) British North America	The schooner was wrecked south of Portsmouth, New Hampshire, United States.
Hillechina	Netherlands	The ship was driven ashore and wrecked in the Vlie. She was on a voyage from Norway to Harlingen, Friesland.
Justine	Sweden	The ship capsized off Dragør, Denmark with the loss of three lives. She was on a voyage from Bombay, India to Malmö.

== 9 April ==
List of shipwrecks: 9 April 1851
Ship	State	Description
British Queen	United Kingdom	The schooner was wrecked on a rock south of Portsmouth, New Hampshire, United States. She was on a voyage from Annapolis, Nova Scotia, British North America to Salem, Massachusetts, United States.
Isis	United Kingdom	The ship struck the quayside and sank at Lowestoft, Suffolk, She was on a voyage from Hartlepool, County Durham to Lowestoft.

== 10 April ==
List of shipwrecks: 10 April 1851
Ship	State	Description
Ardaseer	India	A fire destroyed the ship 100 nautical miles (190 km) off Penang, Malaya. Her crew took to the boats and the next day Liebnitz (Bremen) rescued them. Ardaseer was on a voyage from China to Singapore and Bombay.
Isis	United Kingdom	The ship sank struck the pier and at Lowestoft, Suffolk. She was on a voyage from Hartlepool, County Durham to Lowestoft.
James	United Kingdom	The ship was driven ashore at Fraserburgh, Aberdeenshire.
Nuevo Cid	Spain	The ship was run into by the koff Anna Maria (Russia) and sank at Vlissingen, Zeeland, Netherlands. Her crew were rescued. She was on a voyage from Antwerp, Belgium to Havana, Cuba.
Sydney	United Kingdom	The ship ran aground on the Diamond Sand, in the Hooghly River. She was refloated and completed her voyage to Calcutta, India, where she was placed under repair.
Venus	United Kingdom	The ship was wrecked on Houtman Abrolhos with the loss of a crew member. She was on a voyage from Singapore to the Swan River Colony.

== 11 April ==
List of shipwrecks: 11 April 1851
Ship	State	Description
Brilliant	United Kingdom	The ship ran aground and was damaged on the Manacles. She was on a voyage from Poole, Dorset to Port Glasgow, Renfrewshire. She was refloated and found to be leaky.
Italia	Flag unknown	The steamship ran aground at Umago, Austrian Empire. She was on a voyage from Alexandria, Egypt to Trieste.
St. Anthony	United States	The steamboat struck a submerged object and sank in the Mississippi River downstream of St. Louis, Missouri with the loss of all hands.

== 13 April ==
List of shipwrecks: 13 April 1851
Ship	State	Description
Ida	Denmark	The ship ran aground on the Maldberg Grounds. She was on a voyage from Stege to Leith, Lothian, United Kingdom. She was refloated and resumed her voyage.
Peggy	(United Kingdom of Great Britain and Ireland) Jersey	The cutter struck a rock in St. Brelade's Bay and was abandoned. She sank on 16 April with the loss of five lives whilst attempts were being made to salvage her.

== 14 April ==
List of shipwrecks: 14 April 1851
Ship	State	Description
Rogaland	Norway	The ship was driven ashore on Læsø, Denmark. She was on a voyage from Stavanger to a Baltic port. She was refloated and resumed her voyage.

== 15 April ==
List of shipwrecks: 15 April 1851
Ship	State	Description
Caroline	United Kingdom	The ship was destroyed by fire 30 nautical miles (56 km) off Saba. Her twenty crew survived. She was on a voyage from Tobago to Bristol, Gloucestershire.
Columbus	United States	The ship struck the Bishop and Clerk Rocks and was consequently beached near Cape Cod, Massachusetts. Her crew were rescued. She was on a voyage from Cádiz, Spain to Boston, Massachusetts.
Hazard	United Kingdom	The schooner was driven ashore at Marblehead, Massachusetts.
Marina	United Kingdom	The schooner was driven ashore at Marblehead.
William	Russia	The brig was driven ashore at Scituate, Massachusetts. Her crew were rescued. She was on a voyage from Cádiz to Boston. She was declared a total loss.

== 16 April ==
List of shipwrecks: 16 April 1851
Ship	State	Description
Paragon	United Kingdom	The brig was driven ashore on Monomoy Island Massachusetts, United States. She was on a voyage from Bangor to Queenstown, County Cork and Boston, Massachusetts. She was later refloated and taken in to Newport, where she arrived on 22 April. She was consequently condemned.

== 17 April ==
List of shipwrecks: 17 April 1851
Ship	State	Description
Coromandel	United Kingdom	The ship ran aground west of Amlwch, Anglesey. She was on a voyage from Holyhead, Anglesey to Liverpool, Lancashire. She was refloated and taken in to Amlwch in a sinking condition.
Eden	United Kingdom	The ship was driven ashore 12 nautical miles (22 km) south of Aveiro, Portugal. Her crew were rescued. She was on a voyage from Hamburg to Gibraltar and Marseille, Bouches-du-Rhône, France. Eden was refloated on 3 July and taken in to Figueira da Foz, Portugal.
Ellen	United Kingdom	The schooner sank in the Irish Sea. Her crew were rescued.
Fowler	United Kingdom	The schooner was driven ashore and wrecked on Spectacle Island, Massachusetts, United States. She was on a voyage from Boston, Massachusetts to Martland, Nova Scotia, British North America.
James B. Roach	United States	The brig ran aground on the Horse Reef, off Anegada, Virgin Islands. She was refloated.
Reflector	United Kingdom	The ship was wrecked on Saint Helena. All on board were rescued. She was on a voyage from Cape Town, Cape Colony to Hull, Yorkshire.
Thistle	United Kingdom	The ship was wrecked on "Gorriohs Island", Maine, United States. Her crew were rescued. She was on a voyage from Boston, Massachusetts, United States to Annapolis, Nova Scotia, British North America.

== 18 April ==
List of shipwrecks: 18 April 1851
Ship	State	Description
Clara	United Kingdom	The ship rang aground and was wrecked off Skagen, Denmark. She was on a voyage from Hartlepool, County Durham to a Baltic port.
James T. Foord	United Kingdom	The ship ran aground on the Mud Island, Port Phillip Bay, Victoria. Most passengers were taken off and the cargo lightened, allowing the barque to be towed off without sustaining any damage. The ship journeyed on to Hobsons Bay, Geelong, where some 20 remaining passengers were offloaded, before continuing on to Williamstown near Melbourne for the securing of her cargo. She was on a voyage from Plymouth, Devon to Melbourne, Victoria.
Minerva	United Kingdom	The ship was driven ashore at Marstrand, Sweden. She was on a voyage from Blyth, Northumberland to Memel, Prussia. She was refloated and taken in to Helsingør, Denmark, where she arrived on 22 April.

== 19 April ==
List of shipwrecks: 19 April 1851
Ship	State	Description
Columbine	United Kingdom	The ship ran aground whilst on a voyage from Gainsborough, Lincolnshire to Hull, Yorkshire. She completed her voyage, but sank at Hull after disembarking her passengers.
Herald	France	The ship ran aground and capsized at Tralee, County Kerry, United Kingdom. She was on a voyage from Bayonne, Basses-Pyrénées to Tralee. She was righted.
James Ewing	United Kingdom	The brig was in collision with the brig George (United Kingdom) and sank in the Clyde at Greenock, Renfrewshire. Her crew survived. She was on a voyage from Glasgow, Renfrewshire to Saint Kitts and Antigua.
Maria	United Kingdom	The ship was abandoned in the Atlantic Ocean 240 nautical miles (440 km) west of Cape Clear Island, County Donegal. Her elevel crew took to the boats. They were rescued on 21 April by the barque Prince Oscar Frederick (Norway). Maria was on a voyage from Cardiff, Glamorgan to Quebec City, Province of Canada, British North America.

== 20 April ==
List of shipwrecks: 20 April 1851
Ship	State	Description
Deveron	United Kingdom	The ship was driven ashore near Lemvig, Denmark. Her crew were rescued. She was on a voyage from Newcastle upon Tyne, Northumberland to Danzig.
Freedom	United Kingdom	The ship was driven ashore on the coast of Devon. She was on a voyage from Cardiff, Glamorgan to London. She was refloated and put in to Topsham, Devon in a leaky condition.
Oxielton	United Kingdom	The schooner was run down and sunk off the coast of Kent by the steamship Bordeaux, (France). Her crew were rescued by Bordeaux.
Primrose	(United Kingdom of Great Britain and Ireland) British North America	The ship was driven ashore on Plum Island, Massachusetts, United States. Her crew were rescued. She was on a voyage from Sydney, Nova Scotia to Boston, Massachusetts.
Slater Rebow	United Kingdom	The ship was driven ashore and severely damaged at St. Margaret's Bay, Kent. She was on a voyage from São Miguel Island, Azores to London. She was refloated the next day and taken in to The Downs.

== 21 April ==
List of shipwrecks: 21 April 1851
Ship	State	Description
Ellen	United Kingdom	The ship ran aground at the mouth of the Eider. Her crew were rescued. She was on a voyage from Liverpool, Lancashire to Friedrichstadt, Duchy of Schleswig.
Ellinor Christina	Netherlands	The ship was driven ashore at Beachy Head, Sussex, United Kingdom. She was on a voyage from Rotterdam, South Holland to Batavia, Netherlands East Indies. She was refloated and towed in to Portsmouth, Hampshire.
Jane Maria	United Kingdom	The ship was driven ashore 2 nautical miles (3.7 km) west of Dover, Kent. She was on a voyage from Zakynthos, United States of the Ionian Islands to London. She was refloated and resumed her voyage.
Mary	United Kingdom	The ship was driven ashore in the Baie de Somme. She was on a voyage from Pwllheli, Caernarfonshire to Boulogne, Pas-de-Calais.
Ohio	United States	The steamship was in collision with the steamship Commodore Stockton (United States) and sank in the Delaware River downstream of Philadelphia, Pennsylvania with some loss of life.

== 22 April ==
List of shipwrecks: 22 April 1851
Ship	State	Description
Fortitude	United Kingdom	The barque was sunk by ice off the north coast of Prince Edward Island, British North America. Her crew were rescued. She was on a voyage from London to Quebec City, Province of Canada, British North America.
Fortitude	United Kingdom	The ship was sunk by ice in the Atlantic Ocean before 10 May. Her crew were rescued. She was on a voyage from London to Quebec City, Province of Canada, British North America.
Mary Ann	(United Kingdom of Great Britain and Ireland) British North America	The ship was driven ashore near Truro, Massachusetts, United States with the loss of all hands.
Prudence	United Kingdom	The schooner was driven ashore at Lowestoft, Suffolk. She was refloated.
Vesper	United Kingdom	The ship was driven ashore north of Morup, Sweden. She was on a voyage from Hartlepool, County Durham to Kronstadt, Russia. She was refloated on 25 April and taken in to Varberg for repairs.
Victoria	United Kingdom	The ship ran aground on the Blackwater Bank, in the Irish Sea. She was on a voyage from Liverpool, Lancashire to the Burgois River, British North America. She was refloated on 25 April and put in to Holyhead, Anglesey in a severely leaky condition.

== 23 April ==
List of shipwrecks: 23 April 1851
Ship	State	Description
Amethyst	United Kingdom	The ship struck the Seven Stones Reef and foundered. Her crew were rescued by Mary Laing (United Kingdom). Amethyst was on a voyage from Teignmouth, Devon to Quebec City, Province of Canada, British North America.
Cherub	(United Kingdom of Great Britain and Ireland) Guernsey	The brigantine sank off Alderney, Channel Islands. Her crew were rescued. She was on a voyage from Guernsey to London.
Ellen	United Kingdom	The ship sprang a leak and sank in the North Sea 2 nautical miles (3.7 km) off Southwold, Suffolk. Her crew were rescued. She was on a voyage from Sunderland, County Durham to Maldon, Essex.
Ocean Bride	United Kingdom	The ship ran aground off Terschelling, Friesland, Netherlands. She was on a voyage from Bahia, Brazil to Bremen. She was refloated and resumed her voyage.
William	United Kingdom	The smack struck the Horse Shoe Rock, off Ramsey Island and foundered. Her crew were rescued.

== 24 April ==
List of shipwrecks: 24 April 1851
Ship	State	Description
Aimable Eleonore	France	The ship ran aground south of "Vieux Berceau". Her crew were rescued. She was on a voyage from Bayonne, Basses-Pyrénées to Fécamp, Seine-Inférieure.
Emilie and Ferdinand	(flag) Prussia	The ship was driven ashore at Nexø, Denmark. She was on a voyage from Memel to Hull, Yorkshire. She was refloated and take in to Swinemünde in a leaky condition.
Mathilde	France	The ship ran aground at Bayonne. She was on a voyage from Lisbon, Portugal to Bayonne.

== 25 April ==
List of shipwrecks: 25 April 1851
Ship	State	Description
Maria	United Kingdom	The ship was abandoned in the Atlantic Ocean 250 nautical miles (460 km) west of Cape Clear Island, County Cork. . Her crew were rescued by the barque Prins Oscar Frederick (Norway). Maria was on a voyage from Cardiff, Glamorgan to Quebec City, Province of Canada, British North America.
Three Brothers	United Kingdom	The ship ran aground at Figueira da Foz, Portugal. She was on a voyage from Plymouth, Devon to Saint John's, Newfoundland, British North America.
Rapid	United Kingdom	The ship ran aground at Whitby, Yorkshire. She was on a voyage from Sunderland, County Durham to Trinidad. She was refloated.

== 26 April ==
List of shipwrecks: 26 April 1851
Ship	State	Description
Anna Busch	Russia	The ship was driven ashore on Ulmanzekholm. She was on a voyage from Reval to Saint Petersburg. She had been refloated by 29 April and taken to Reval.
Eliza	France	The ship was wrecked at Bizerte, Algeria.

== 27 April ==
List of shipwrecks: 27 April 1851
Ship	State	Description
Johanne	Kolberg	The ship was driven ashore at Kolberg. Her crew were rescued. She was on a voyage from Copenhagen, Denmark to Kolberg.
Letitia Barker	United Kingdom	The ship sprang a leak and foundered in the Atlantic Ocean. Her crew were rescued by the barque Reserve (United Kingdom). Letitia Barker was on a voyage from the Clyde to Boston, Massachusetts, United States.
Mariner	United Kingdom	The sloop ran aground in the River Mersey. She was then run into by the sloop Sarah (United Kingdom) and was damaged. Mariner was on a voyage from Wicklow to Runcorn, Cheshire.
Mary	United Kingdom	The ship ran aground on the Drumroe Bank, in the Irish Sea. She was on a voyage from Waterford to London.
SMS Nix	Prussian Navy	The aviso ran aground on the Marienhaker. She was on a voyage from Swinemünde to Stettin.
Two Sisters	United Kingdom	The ship ran aground on the Kentish Knock. She was on a voyage from South Shields, County Durham to Venice, Kingdom of Lombardy–Venetia. She was refloated and put in to Margate, Kent in a leaky condition.

== 28 April ==
List of shipwrecks: April 1851
Ship	State	Description
Amulet	United Kingdom	The ship ran aground at Lisbon, Portugal. She was on a voyage from Newcastle upon Tyne, Northumberland to Lisbon.
Arion	United Kingdom	The brig foundered in the Atlantic Ocean. Her crew were rescued by Diadem (United Kingdom). Arion was on a voyage from Bangor, Caernarfonshire to Boston, Massachusetts, United States.
Crown	United Kingdom	The ship ran aground on Keith's Reef, in the Mediterranean Sea. She was on a voyage from Newcastle upon Tyne, Northumberland to Galaţi, Ottoman Empire. She was refloated on 30 April and put in to Malta.
Dacila	Spain	The brig collided with the barque De Amstel (Netherlands) and sank in the English Channel off Beachy Head, Sussex, United Kingdom with the loss of one life. She was on a voyage from Tenerife, Canary Islands to London.
Florence	United Kingdom	The ship was wrecked at Old Calabar, Africa. She was on a voyage from Liverpool, Lancashire to A Coruña, Spain and Old Calabar.
Heed	United Kingdom	The schooner was driven ashore at Brancaster, Norfolk. She was on a voyage from Hull, Yorkshire to Penzance, Cornwall. She was refloated and taken in to Brancaster.
Johannes	Denmark	The ship was driven ashore at Kolberg. Her crew were rescued. She was on a voyage from Copenhagen to Kolberg.

== 29 April ==
List of shipwrecks: 29 April 1851
Ship	State	Description
G. H. Wappœus	Hamburg	The ship ran aground on the Nordergrunde, in the North Sea. She was on a voyage from Singapore to Hamburg. She was refloated the next day and taken in to Cuxhaven.
Giles	United Kingdom	The ship struck rocks at Ballyferris Point, County Down and was damaged. She was on a voyage from Glasgow, Renfrewshire to Porto, Portugal. She was refloated and taken in to Belfast, County Antrim for repairs.
Mary	United Kingdom	The brig foundered in the North Sea off Cromer, Norfolk. Her crew survived. She was on a voyage from Hartlepool, County Durham to Dieppe, Seine-Inférieure, France.

== 30 April ==
List of shipwrecks: 30 April 1851
Ship	State	Description
Fenwick	United Kingdom	The brig ran aground at Dover, Kent. She was on a voyage from Dover to Havre de Grâce, Seine-Inférieure, France. She was refloated and put back to Dover in a leaky condition.
George	United Kingdom	The galiot collided with Gem (United Kingdom) and foundered in the English Channel. Her crew were rescued by Gem. George was on a voyage from Sunderland, County Durham to Saint-Valery-sur-Somme, France.
Mary Laing	United Kingdom	The ship sprang a leak and foundered off the Eddystone Rock. Her eleven crew were rescued by the trawl sloop Complete (United Kingdom). Mary Laing was on a voyage from Sunderland, County Durham to Quebec City, Province of Canada, British North America.
Phœbus	United Kingdom	The ship ran aground at Drogheda, County Louth. She was on a voyage from Naples, Kingdom of the Two Sicilies to Drogheda.
Primrose	(United Kingdom of Great Britain and Ireland) British North America	The brig was driven ashore on Plum Island, New York, United States. She was on a voyage from Sydney, Nova Scotia to Boston, Massachusetts, United States. She was refloated on 10 July and towed in to Newburyport, Massachusetts.

== Unknown date ==
List of shipwrecks: Unknown date in April 1851
Ship	State	Description
Anne	United Kingdom	The ship struck a sunken rock and foundered in the Irish Sea west of the Tuskar Rock before 20 April. Her crew were rescued by the schooner Anne (United Kingdom). The ship thas sank was on a voyage from Liverpool, Lancashire to Waterford.
Emelie	France	The ship was driven ashore and wrecked at Absecon, New Jersey, United States. She was on a voyage from Cette, Hérault to New York.
Harriet	United Kingdom	The ship was wrecked near "Barona", on the south coast of Saint Domingo before 19 April.
Laura	United Kingdom	The ship ran aground off Cape Farewell, New Zealand. She was on a voyage from Sydney, New South Wales to Liverpool, Lancashire. She was refloated and put in to Wellington, New Zealand, where she arrived on 4 April
Maria	Sweden	The ship was driven ashore at Stockvik, Sweden. She was refloated.
Munro	United Kingdom	The ship was wrecked on the Fahludd Reef, off Gotland, Sweden. She was on a voyage from Saint Petersburg, Russia to Leith, Lothian.
Nestor	United Kingdom	The ship was abandoned in the Atlantic Ocean. Her crew were rescued by Dart (United Kingdom). Nestor was on a voyage from Liverpool to Cuba.
Pomerania	Prussia	The ship was wrecked at Ny-Hellesund, Norway before 21 April. She was on a voyage from Wolgast to Hull, Yorkshire, United Kingdom.
Sibella	Russia	The ship was lost in the North Sea before 7 April. Her crew were rescued. She was on a voyage from Liepāja to Grimstad, Norway and London.
Sunderland	United Kingdom	The ship foundered in the English Channel before 24 April.
