= Ardaseer (ship) =

Several ships have been named Ardaseer, or a variant of that name, possibly for the Persian king Ardashir I, or in the 19th century for Ardaseer Cursetjee Wadia.

- Shah Ardaseer (1786 ship) was built at Bombay. English transliterations of her name show her as Shah or Shaw + Adaseer, or Ardaseer, or Ardasier, or Adasier, or Ardasheer, or Ardeseer. A fire on 13 September 1809 at Bombay burnt her. She then may have been repaired and enlarged to become the hulk HMS Arrogant, which was moved to Trincomalee in 1822 and sold there in 1842.
- Ardaseer Grab, a grab, was listed at Bombay in 1798. This may have been the Ardaseer Ketch employed in 1795 and 1796 on the British expeditions to Ceylon and the Moluccas
- Ardaseer (1836 ship) was a clipper ship built at Bombay Dockyard. She was in the opium trade, carrying opium from Calcutta to China. A fire on 4 April 1851 destroyed her as she was on a voyage from China to Singapore and Calcutta.

One of these ships may have given her name to Ardasier Reef.
