= New York (1836 steamboat) =

American steamboat built 1836

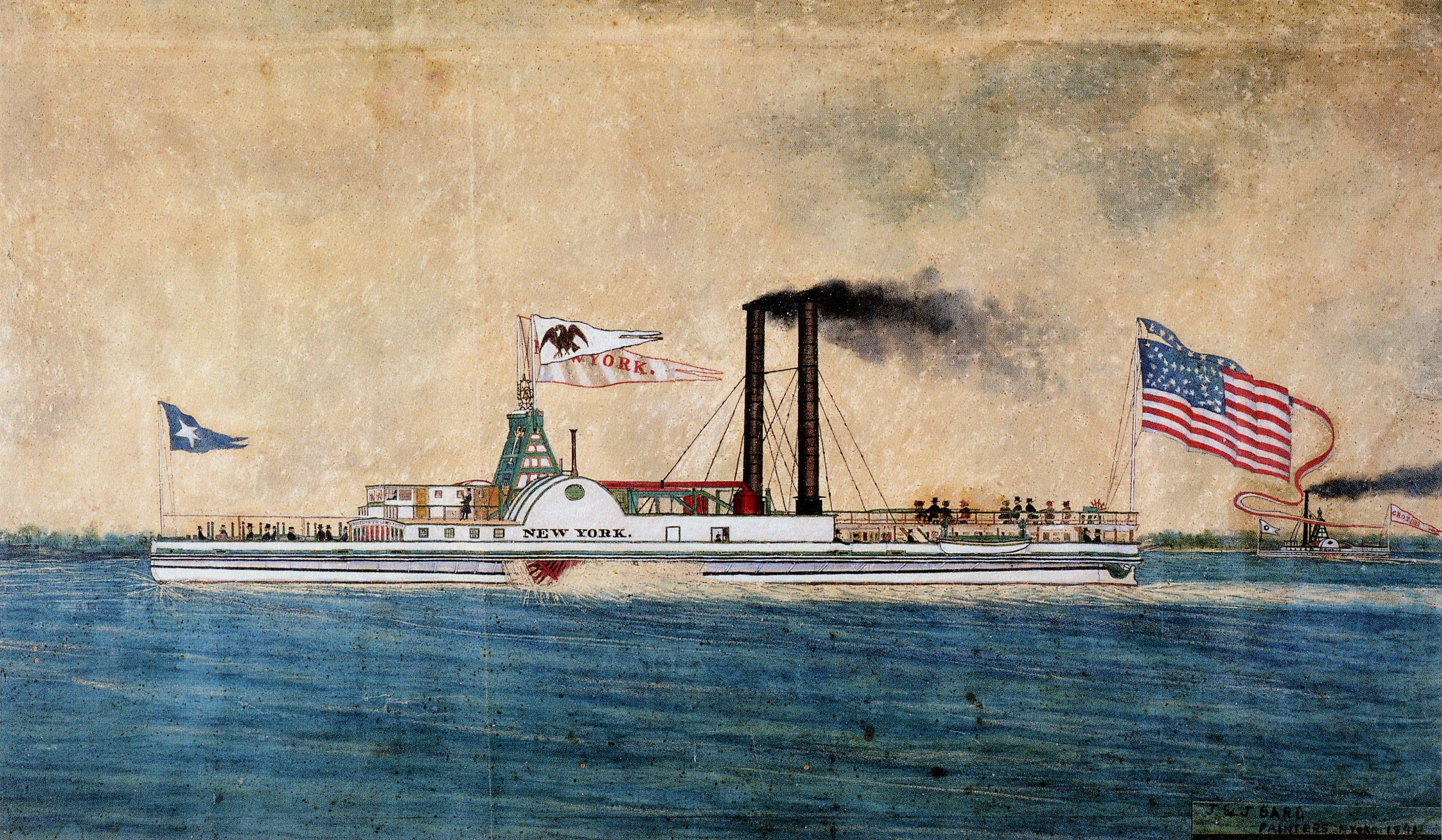
- New York after her 1841 rebuild; painting by J. & J. Bard

History
- Name: New York
- Namesake: New York City
- Owner: New Haven Steamboat Co. (1836–39); Connecticut Steamboat Co. (1840–50); Durant, Lathrop & Co. (1851–54); Schuyler's Line Steam Tow Boats (1854–70); Thomas Cornell (1870–75)
- Operator: See owners
- Route: New York, NY – New Haven, CT (original)
- Builder: Lawrence & Sneden (Manhattan, NY)
- Completed: 1836
- Fate: Abandoned 1875

General characteristics
- Type: Sidewheel steamboat
- Tonnage: 524 gross
- Length: 212 ft (65 m)
- Beam: 23 ft (7.0 m)
- Draft: 5 ft (1.5 m) (loaded)
- Depth of hold: 11 ft (3.4 m)
- Installed power: Single-cylinder crosshead; 50 in (130 cm) bore by 10 ft (3.0 m) stroke
- Propulsion: 24 ft 6 in (7.47 m) sidewheels with 30 in (76 cm) dip
- Speed: Approx. 20 mph (32 km/h) (cruising)

New York was an American passenger-cargo sidewheel steamboat built in 1836 for service on Long Island Sound. When new, she was the largest steamboat yet to operate on the route between New York and New Haven, Connecticut, and was one of the largest Sound steamboats of her day.

New York continued to operate on the Sound until 1850, when she was sold to New York parties and began service on New York's Hudson River. By the mid-1850s she had been converted into a towboat, and remained in service on the Hudson in that capacity to the end of her career in 1875.

British novelist Charles Dickens wrote an unflattering description of New York in 1842, when she was still operating on Long Island Sound as a passenger steamer. The description appears in his book American Notes.

== Design and construction ==
New York, a wooden-hulled passenger-cargo sidewheel steamboat, was built in Manhattan, New York, in 1836 by Lawrence & Sneden for the New Haven Steamboat Company, which planned to operate the vessel between New York City and New Haven, Connecticut. She was 212 feet (65 m) in length, with a beam of 23 feet (7.0 m), hold depth of 11 feet (3.4 m) and loaded draft of 5 feet (1.5 m). (Note: Dayton erroneously gives the length of the vessel as 250 feet (76 m).) With a gross tonnage of 524, she was at the time considerably larger than any steamboat previously built for service between New Haven and New York, and was one of the largest steamers on Long Island Sound. (Note: New York may briefly have held the title of largest boat on the Sound, but in the same month as she entered service, the 676-ton Massachusetts also made her debut. Later that year, the Rhode Island (586 tons) also entered service on the Sound.) She was considered a fine vessel for her day.

New York was powered by a single-cylinder crosshead engine with 50-inch (130 cm) bore and 10-foot (3.0 m) stroke, built by the Allaire Iron Works of New York. Steam was originally supplied by an iron boiler installed in the hold and exhausted through a single smokestack amidships. By 1841, this arrangement had been superseded by a pair of boilers and smokestacks on the guards, (Note: See the 1841 painting by J. & J. Bard.) in conformity with the then-prevailing trend in steamboat design, introduced to reduce damage and injuries in the event of boiler explosions. New York's sidewheels were 24 feet 6 inches (7.47 m) in diameter, and had 12-foot (3.7 m) buckets with a 30-inch (76 cm) dip.

== Service history ==
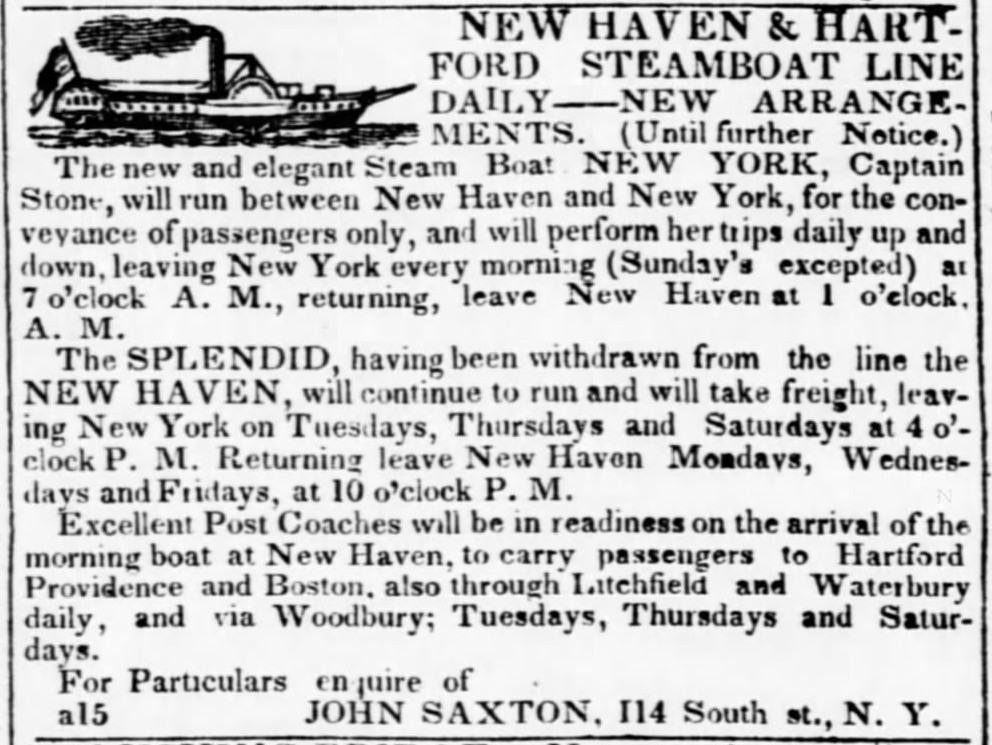
April 1836 advertisement for New York

=== Early service, 1836–1839 ===
On April 4, 1836, New York commenced a daily passenger-and-mail service from New York to New Haven, replacing the company's steamboat Splendid, which went into reserve. New York initially ran as a passenger-only service, six days a week, while her stablemate, the steamer New Haven, operated a freight service on the same route three days a week. Not long after New York's introduction however, the Post Office insisted upon a seven-day-a-week service, which was duly implemented in spite of company protests. At this time, the passenger fare from New York to New Haven was $2 (equivalent to $59 in 2025). New York and New Haven were to maintain this busy and well patronized service for the next three years.

On April 25, 1838, New York reportedly made a record-breaking trip from New Haven to New York—a distance of 86 miles (138 km)—in 4 hours and 23 minutes, at an average speed of just under 20 miles per hour (32 km/h).

Two days earlier, on April 23, the Great Western—the first steamship expressly designed to make regular transatlantic crossings—had arrived in New York, completing her historic maiden voyage. (Note: The contemporaneous painting by Joseph Walter shows New York among the vessels in Great Western's welcoming fleet.) Great Western's scheduled departure on May 7 attracted much public interest, and numerous steamboat owners arranged excursions for the upcoming event, including New York's, who advertised a three-hour excursion at fifty cents a head, with onboard entertainment including a brass band. Other steamboats charged between a dollar and 25 cents for similar services. On the day in question, an estimated 50,000 people turned out to farewell the British ship, with a large fleet of steamboats and other watercraft, including New York, escorting the vessel out of the harbor.

=== Fire and change of ownership, 1839–1850 ===
On the night of March 22, 1839, at about 2 am, a fire broke out in New York's fire room while the vessel was docked at New Haven. By the time firefighters arrived, the fire had spread to such an extent that the steamer was towed to shoal waters in the expectation that she would sink. The fire was eventually extinguished, but not before it had destroyed the steamer's upper works, cabin and fittings, as well as much of the customers' luggage, which had been stowed the previous day. The engine was also substantially damaged. Total loss was estimated at more than $40,000 (equivalent to $1,209,000 in 2025), and there was no insurance. With this setback, the New Haven Steamboat Company abruptly suspended its operations and sold its assets, which included the New York, to the Connecticut Steamboat Company, owned by Cornelius Vanderbilt and Memenon Sanford.

New York's new owners had the vessel towed to New York, where she was remodeled and rebuilt. In the meantime, Vanderbilt replaced her on the New York – New Haven route with an old, slow ferryboat named Bolivar. As this vessel fell below the expectations of customers, two opposition parties quickly arrived to take advantage of the situation—the Citizens' Line, which placed the steamboat Telegraph on the route, and Curtis Peck, who transferred his vessel Belle from the Hudson River. Realizing his error, Vanderbilt returned the New York to service in 1841, and from June of that year, a three-way rate war broke out on the route, with fares sometimes dropping as low as 12½ cents. The rate war continued until November 1842, when Peck sold his vessel Belle—which had been the best patronized vessel—to Vanderbilt. Telegraph was withdrawn a short time later.

New York thereafter continued in service on the Sound with the Connecticut Steamboat Company until 1850. In October 1843, the steamer broke a crankshaft on her way to New York, and was forced to return to New Haven. In March of the following year, she broke a crankshaft again, but was able to complete her voyage to New Haven with the use of only one paddlewheel. In November 1847, New York encountered the Bridgeport steamer Nimrod which had broken down on the Sound, and towed the disabled vessel to Oyster Bay.

==== Dickens' description ====
In early 1842, the English novelist Charles Dickens travelled to the United States. On February 12, Dickens journeyed from New Haven to New York aboard the steamer New York, later recording his impressions of the vessel in his book American Notes:

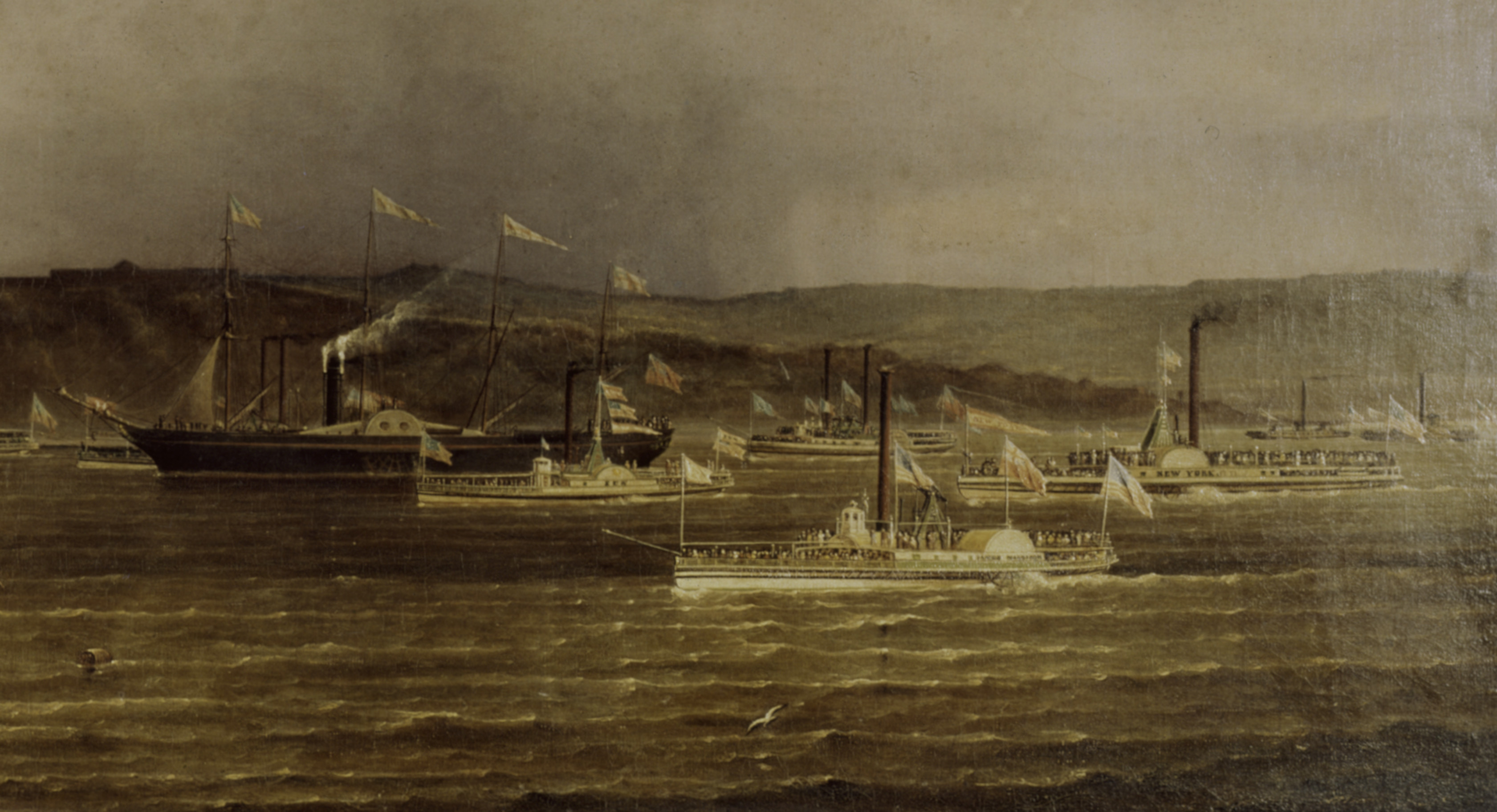
Detail from Joseph Walter's painting showing New York as part of the welcoming fleet for the steamship Great Western (left) during the latter's historic arrival in New York Harbor, April 23, 1838. New York is shown here with a single smokestack, as originally built.

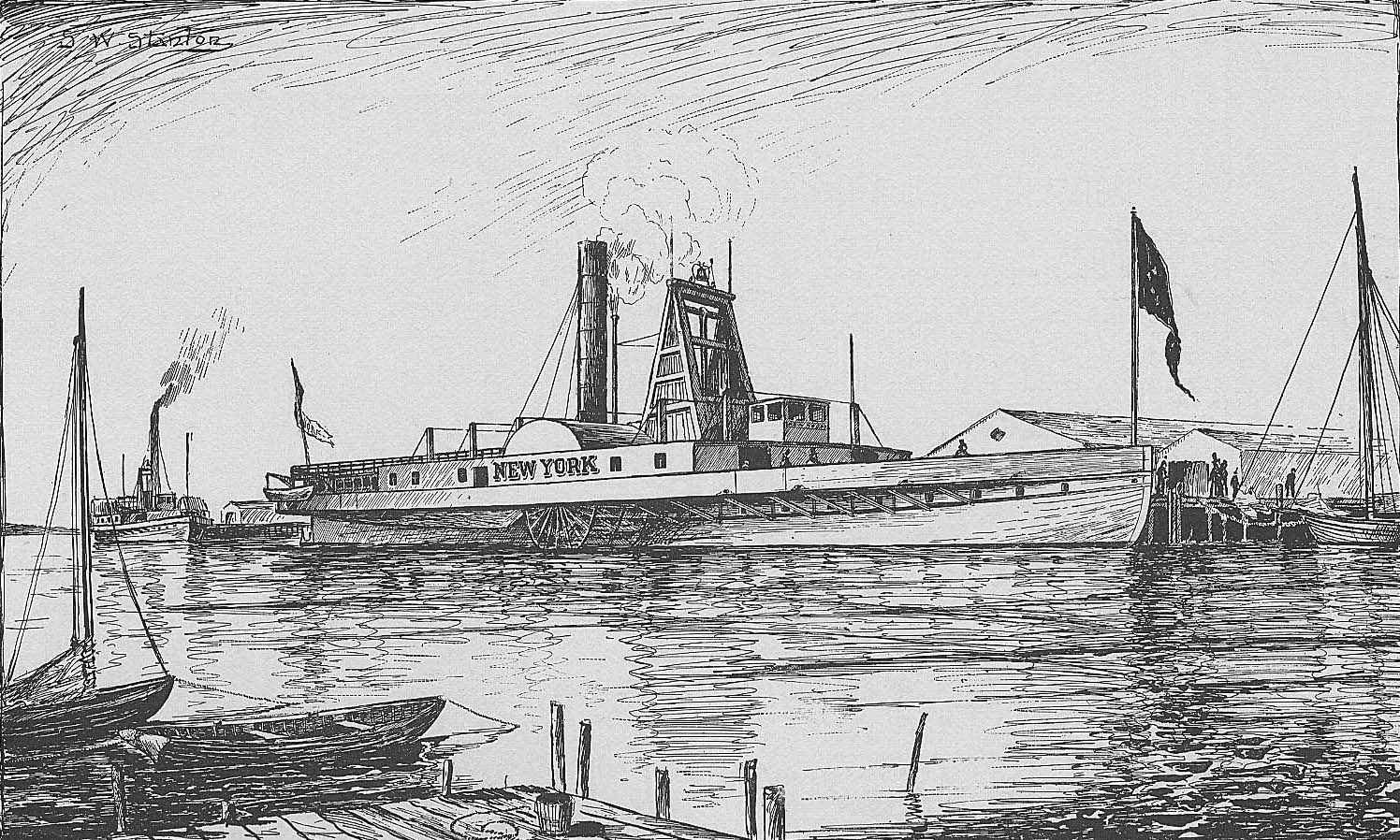
Three-quarter bow view of New York as she appeared in early service, prior to her 1841 rebuild. 1895 drawing based on earlier images.

After a night's rest, we rose early, and in good time went down to the wharf, and on board the packet New York for New York. This was the first American steamboat of any size that I had seen; and certainly to an English eye it was infinitely less like a steamboat than a huge floating bath. I could hardly persuade myself, indeed, but that the bathing establishment off Westminster Bridge, which I left a baby, had suddenly grown to an enormous size; run away from home; and set up in foreign parts as a steamer. Being in America, too, which our vagabonds do so particularly favor, it seemed the more probable.

The great difference in appearance between these packets and ours, is, that there is so much of them out of the water; the main-deck being enclosed on all sides, and filled with casks and goods, like any second or third floor in a stack of ware-houses; and the promenade or hurricane-deck being a-top of that again. A part of the machinery is always above this deck; where the connecting-rod, in a strong and lofty frame, is seen working away like an iron top-sawyer. There is seldom any mast or tackle: nothing aloft but two tall black chimneys. The man at the helm is shut up in a little house in the fore part of the boat (the wheel being connected with the rudder by iron chains, working the whole length of the deck); and the passengers, unless the weather be very fine indeed, usually congregate below. Directly you have left the wharf, all the life, and stir, and bustle of a packet cease. You wonder for a long time how she goes on, for there seems to be nobody in charge of her; and when another of these dull machines comes splashing by, you feel quite indignant with it, as a sullen, cumbrous, ungraceful, unshiplike leviathan: quite forgetting that the vessel you are on board of, is its very counterpart.

There is always a clerk's office on the lower deck, where you pay your fare; a ladies' cabin; baggage and stowage rooms; engineer's room; and in short a great variety of perplexities which render the discovery of the gentleman's cabin, a matter of some difficulty. It often occupies the whole length of the boat (as it did in this case), and has three or four tiers of berths on each side. When I first descended into the cabin of the New York, it looked, in my unaccustomed eyes, about as long as the Burlington Arcade.

=== Towboat service, 1851–1875 ===
In 1850, New York was sold to investors from New York state, who in 1851 organized a company, Durant, Lathrop & Co., to operate the vessel. New York subsequently entered service for this company on the Hudson River. By 1854, she had been converted into a towboat, and she would continue to serve in this capacity on the Hudson River for the remainder of her career.

In 1855, New York was purchased by Schuyler's Line Steam Tow Boats. In 1870, she was acquired by Thomas Cornell. The steamer was abandoned in 1875.
