= USS Valparaiso =

Cargo ship of the United States Navy

History

United States
- Name: USS Valparaiso
- Namesake: Battle of Valparaiso
- Laid down: not known
- Launched: 1836
- Acquired: 22 November 1861
- In service: 1862
- Out of service: 1865
- Stricken: 1865 (est.)
- Homeport: Port Royal, South Carolina
- Fate: Sold, 2 September 1865

General characteristics
- Displacement: 402 tons
- Length: 117 ft 6 in (35.81 m)
- Beam: 27 ft 6 in (8.38 m)
- Draft: not known
- Propulsion: Clipper sail
- Speed: varied
- Complement: 36
- Armament: none

USS Valparaiso was a Navy vessel that was given a "second life" in her nautical career. During the start of the American Civil War, she was destined to be used as a "stone ship" hazard to navigation sunk in a Southern harbor, but the Union Navy reconsidered and put her to work as a stores ship, supporting the blockade of the ports of the Confederate States of America.

== Built as a Baltimore Clipper ==
Valparaiso—a brig built at Baltimore, Maryland, in 1836—was one of a class of vessels popularly called "Baltimore clippers" because of their reputation for speed and outstanding performance. Valparaiso was purchased by the Navy at New Bedford, Massachusetts, on 22 November 1861.

== Civil War service ==
The sailing vessel was originally intended to be sunk on 20 January 1862 at the entrance to Charleston harbor, South Carolina, as part of the second "Stone Fleet." These stone fleets—the first of which was sunk at Charleston on 20 December 1861—consisted of older vessels, mostly derelicts, filled with large boulders. They were intended to aid Northern efforts to blockade the Southern coastline in the early days of the Civil War when the Union Navy was still relatively small.

However, instead of deploying with her sisters at the bottom of Charleston harbor as originally planned, Valparaiso joined the South Atlantic Blockading Squadron of Flag Officer Samuel F. Du Pont and served as a storeship at Port Royal, South Carolina. She remained at Port Royal for the duration of the war. After the collapse of the Confederacy, the old brig was sold at public auction at Bay Point, South Carolina, on 2 September 1865.

== See also ==
- Union Blockade
