= RMS Unicorn =

British passenger ship

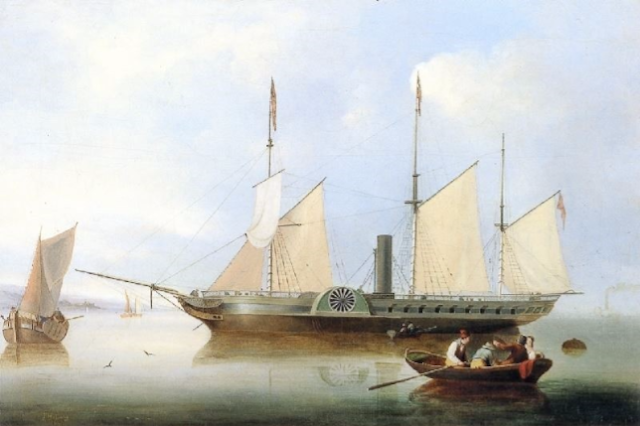
- Unicorn in Salem Harbor, by Fitz Henry Lane

History

United Kingdom
- Name: Unicorn (1836–1857)
- Namesake: Unicorn
- Operator: Cunard Line (1840–1845); James Whitney (1845-1849); Samuel Cunard (1849)
- Port of registry: Glasgow (1836-1847); Halifax (1847-1849); New York (1849); San Francisco (1849-1853); Sydney (1853-1857)
- Route: Liverpool to Glasgow (1836)
- Builder: Robert Steele & Company, Greenock, Scotland
- Yard number: 85
- Launched: 26 May 1836
- Completed: 4 July 1836
- Maiden voyage: 16 May 1840 (Cunard)
- In service: July 1836
- Out of service: 1849
- Refit: 1848
- Fate: Sold to Pacific Mail Steamship Company, 1849

United States
- Name: Unicorn
- Operator: Pacific Mail Steamship Company (1849-1853)
- Port of registry: San Francisco
- Route: San Francisco - Panama
- Acquired: 1849
- In service: 1849
- Out of service: 1853, 1857
- Fate: Sold 1853, 1857

Imperial China
- Name: E H Green (1857–1872)
- Owner: Thomas Hunt & Co (1856-)
- In service: 1857
- Out of service: 1872
- Refit: 1854
- Fate: Register closed 1872

General characteristics
- Type: Paddle steamer
- Tonnage: 649 GRT
- Length: 163 ft (50 m)
- Beam: 23 ft 6 in (7.16 m)
- Depth: 17 ft 3 in (5.26 m)
- Installed power: 260nhp
- Propulsion: As built; 2 × flue boilers; 2 × side lever engines
- Speed: 9.75 knots (18.06 km/h; 11.22 mph)
- Capacity: 241 passengers: 51 × Cabin class; 190 × Steerage class
- Crew: 80
- Notes: Cunard's first ship

RMS Unicorn was a British transatlantic paddle steamer built in 1836. After being bought in 1840, she was the first ship to sail with Cunard, traveling between the United Kingdom and Canada. She left the company in 1846, and would continue to operate under various owners until 1872, when her register was closed.

== Description ==
The Unicorn was a wooden hulled express ship which measured 650 gross register tons, and 390 net register tons. She had a length of 163 feet (50 metres), a beam of 23.5 feet (7.16 metres) and a depth of 17.3 feet (5.27 metres). She had accommodations for 51 cabin class passengers and 190 steerage passengers. She was originally built with two flue boilers, but these were replaced with two tubular boilers in 1848. These new boilers were 10 ft (3m) long and wide, 14 ft (4.27m) tall and had three furnaces each. She had an average speed of 9.5 knots

== Career ==
Unicorn was built by Robert Steele & Company in Greenock and launched on May 26th, 1836. She had a sister ship named Eagle, launched February 1, 1835 Unicorn, along with her sisters, originally served under George & John Burns (Glasgow & Liverpool Steam Shipping Co.), sailing the Glasgow-Liverpool route. In 1840, she was purchased by Samuel Cunard for the newly formed Cunard Line, becoming the first ship to sail with the company. She departed on her maiden voyage on May 16, 1840, with 453 tons of coal, 27 passengers and 80 crew. She arrived at Halifax on June 1, and Boston on the 3rd. After entering service with Cunard, Unicorn initially sailed along the Halifax-Pictou-Quebec route before switching to Liverpool-Halifax-Boston route. On November 11, 1843, she was involved in rescuing passengers and crew from Premier, a brig that was wrecked in the St. Lawrence. In 1845, she was sold away to James Whitney, and received a major refit on the River Clyde.

After leaving Cunard in 1845, she briefly served as a corvette in the Portuguese Navy. She was bought by Samuel Cunard in January 1849, given to his son in February, and sold in October 1849. From 1849 to 1853, she operated under the Pacific Mail Steamship Co. and would make trips from San Francisco to Panama. After that, she was put up for sale in Australia before going on to operate in Chinese waters. On August 15, 1856, Unicorn was towing a Chinese junk, when her captain caught and broke his leg on a hawser. He died on August 23 in Hong Kong. In January 1857, the Unicorn could not get insurance, and she was renamed E. H. Green. Soon after, she began operating strictly as a tugboat at Fuzhou, China.

Information is scarce after 1859, although she was laid up in China. Her British register was closed on May 16, 1872, meaning she was possibly sold for scrap not long prior.
