= Robert Steele & Company =

Scottish shipbuilding firm

ROBERT Steele & Company
- Type: Private
- Industry: Shipbuilding
- Founded: 1815
- Defunct: 1883
- Fate: Sold to Scott & Co. in 1883
- Headquarters: Greenock, Scotland
- Key people: Robert Steele I, Robert Steele II
- Parent: Steele & Carswell (1796-1815)

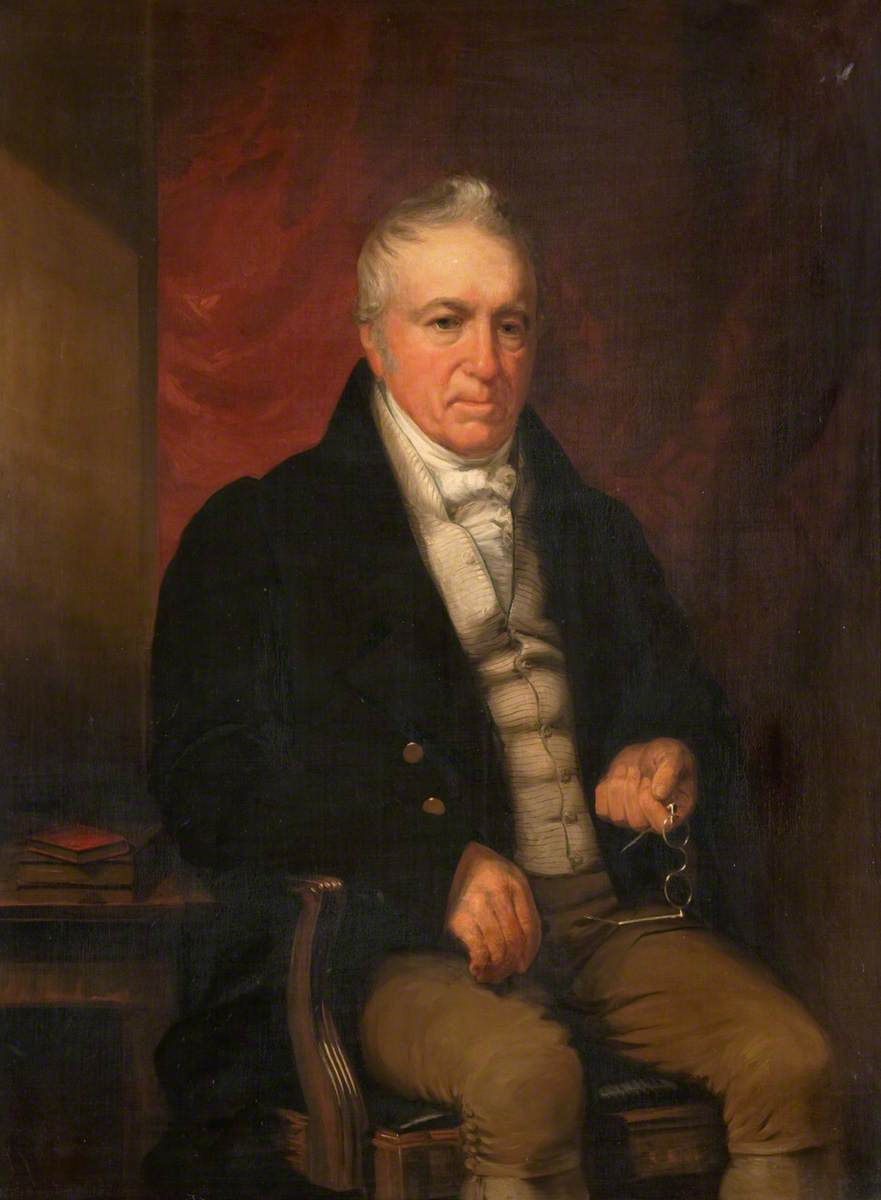
Robert Steele (1745-1830), an 1826 portrait by John B. Fleming (1792-1845), McLean Museum and Art Gallery.

Robert Steele & Company was a shipbuilding firm based in Greenock, Scotland. The business was formed in 1815 by Robert Steele (1745-1830) and two sons. It followed the dissolution of an earlier shipbuilding partnership between Robert Steele and John Carswell, known as "Steele and Carswell."

== The early years ==
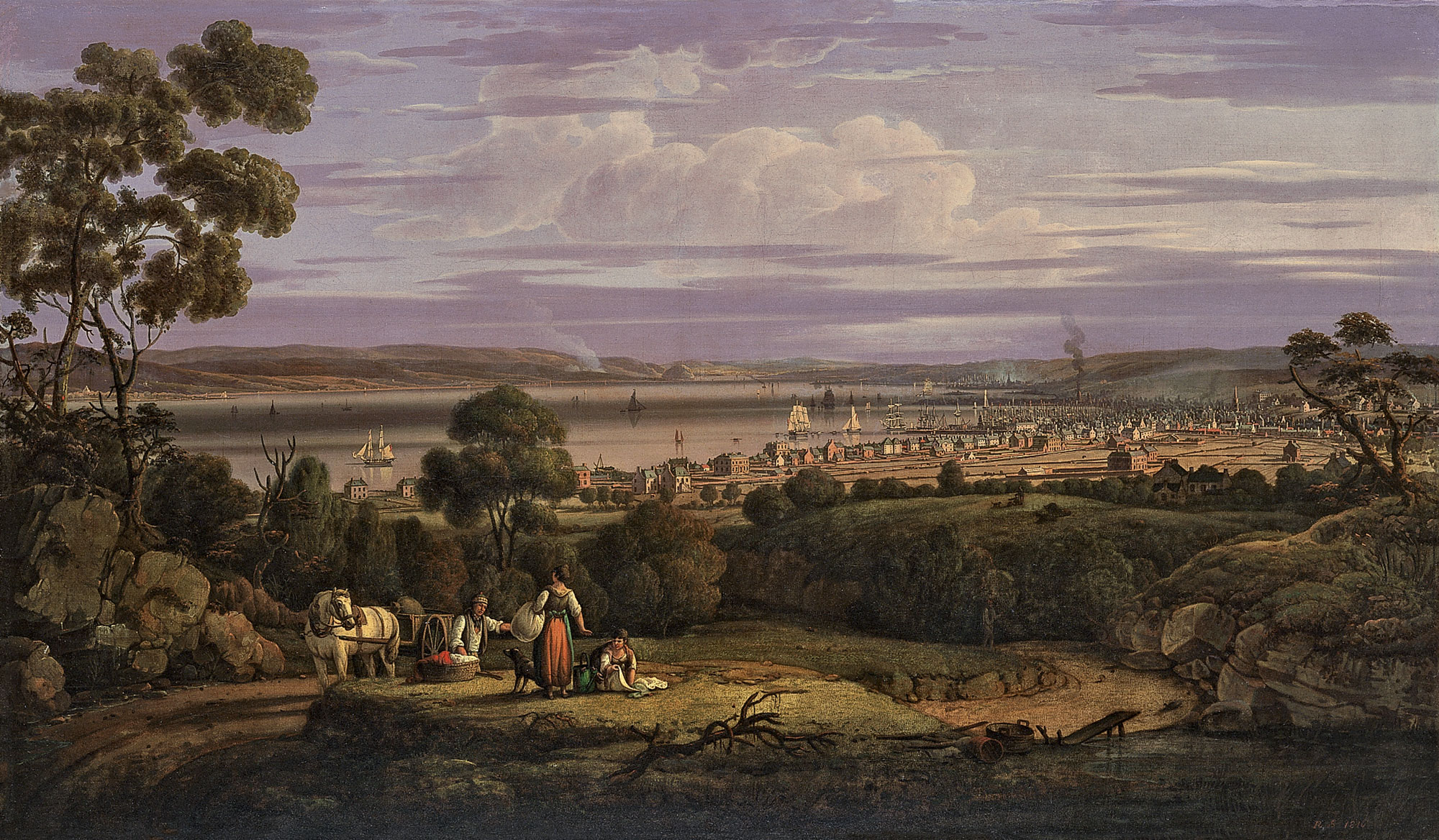
View of Greenock, 1816, by Robert Salmon, (Thyssen-Bornemisza Museum, Madrid)

Robert Steele (1745-1830) was born to James Steele and his wife Anne nee Laurie in 1745. James had a small shipbuilding yard at Saltcoats that specialised in coasters and fishing vessels. When he was old enough, Robert began an apprenticeship under his father. After the death of James, Robert continued in the Saltcoats yard for another decade before deciding to go into partnership with John Carswell who had a shipyard at Greenock.

Steele and Carswell commenced operations in at their yard in the Bay of Quick to the west of Greenock in 1796. Their first vessel was the Clyde (145 tons) launched in April of the following year. The partnership lasted 20 years during which time the yard produced 34 vessels. One of these was the Bengal, the first East Indiaman built at Greenock. The partnership was dissolved in 1815 and a new company formed using the same yard. The new firm was called Robert Steele and Company and was a partnership between Robert and his two sons, James and Robert II. The first vessel built by the new company was the three-masted barque Rebecca.

== Steamships ==
The firm began to build steamships in 1821. A new yard was established at Rue End and the Shaw’s Water Foundry and Engineering Company was purchased to make the engines and boilers for their steamers. So quickly did the firm become involved in this new form of shipbuilding that in 1826 they launched the United Kingdom the largest paddle steamship in the world to that date. Soon after Robert Steele retired from the business and he died in 1830. During his time at Greenock he was involved in the construction of more than fifty vessels. Six of them were steamships, one of them the worlds largest. Robert Steele the younger now took over as principal in the business; his brother, James, having died some years earlier.

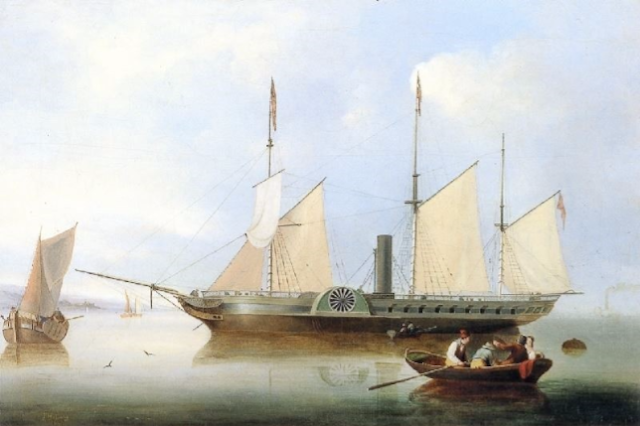
SS Unicorn by Fitz Henry Lane

By the 1840s the firm was well known as a producer of high-quality wooden-hulled paddle steamers. These were used as packets on coastal runs between ports like Glasgow and Liverpool or on short ocean crossings between Britain and mainland Europe, or Britain and Ireland. One of these was the Unicorn (650 tons) and was bought by Samuel Cunard and made the first Atlantic crossing for his firm. Steeles also built the hull of the SS Columbia in 1840, which became one of four steamships used by Cunard to fulfil the Royal Mail contracts awarded the enterprising Canadian. Steele’s went on to work on all but four of the first thirteen Cunard steamers.

Steele’s prominence in the first generation of steamship construction was short-lived. Wooden-hulled paddle steamers were soon superseded by iron-hulled vessels that were faster, stronger and cheaper to maintain. These in turn were made redundant by vessels with screw propellers rather than paddles. The introduction of iron-hulled vessels marked the end of Steele’s association with Cunard.

To meet the changing times Robert Steele II in 1854 opened a bigger yard at Cartsdyke West and began to build screw-steamers with iron hulls. The first of these, launched later in 1854, was the S.S. Beaver. This was followed two years later with a contract to build the SS Canadian (2,000 tons) for the Allan Line. The firm went on to build many more screw steamers for the line and these were used as packets between the U.K. and Canada. Orders for the Allan Line and other owners saw Steeles again in the mainstream of British shipbuilding.

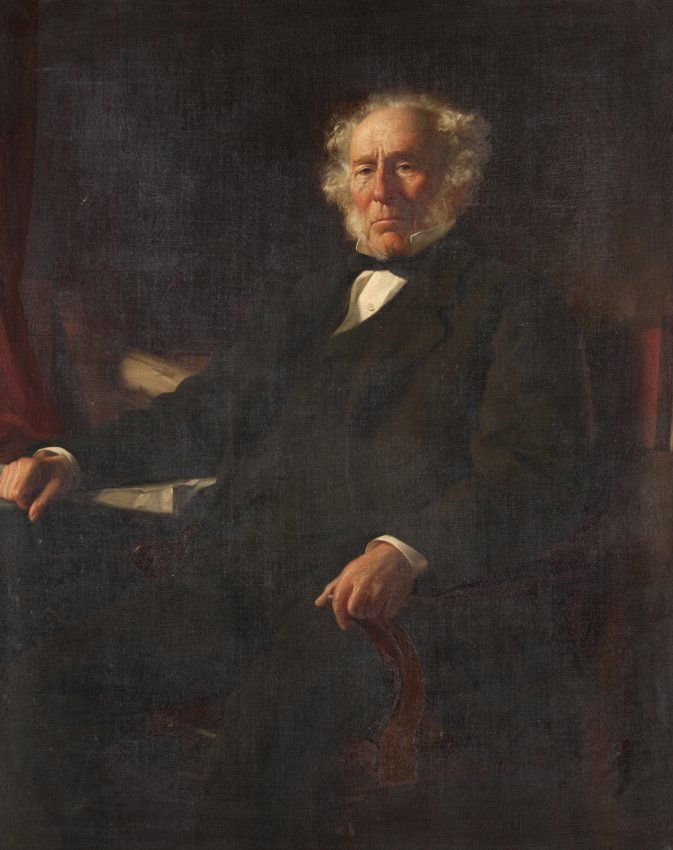
Robert Steele II (1791-1879) portrait by Norman MacBeth, 1877 (Inverclyde Libraries, Museum and Inverclyde Archives)

Technological change continued with steel replacing iron in hull construction. Shipbuilding generally became more complex with innovations such as the compound engine and bilge keels to reduce rolling. The skill of the marine engineer gradually became more important than that of the shipbuilder. The Sardinian launched in 1874 was the last big steamer built by the firm as it found itself faced by a new wave of technological change in the industry.

Although best known at this time as a builder of large steamships, the firm had continued throughout to build sailing ships, barges and yachts. Between 1864 and 1869 the firm built 45 sailing vessels but no steamships. What encouraged this return to sail was the expansion of the far-eastern and Australian routes where wind powered ships could still compete with steam vessels. Among the firms achievements during this period was the construction of a number of tea-clippers.

== The tea clippers ==
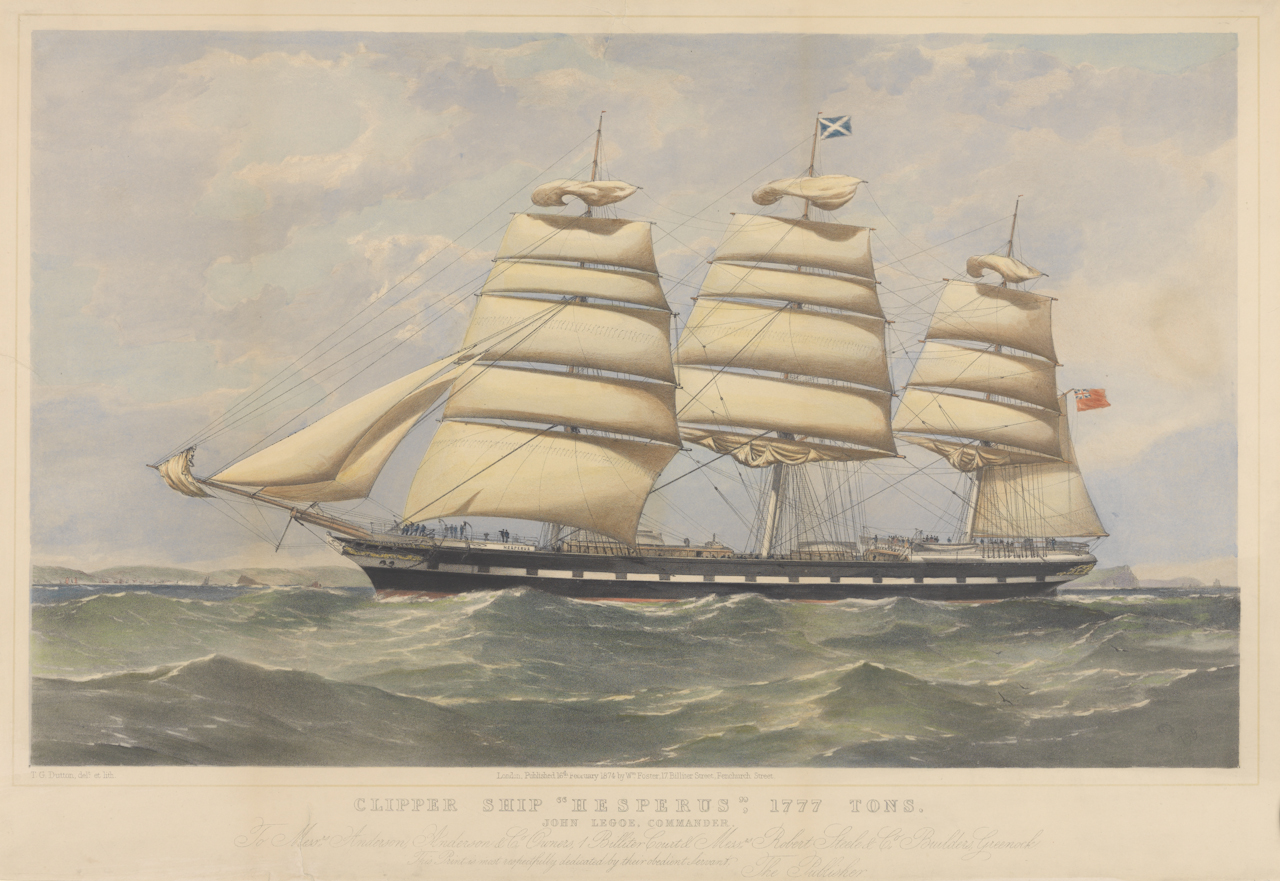
Clipper ship Hesperus (1874).

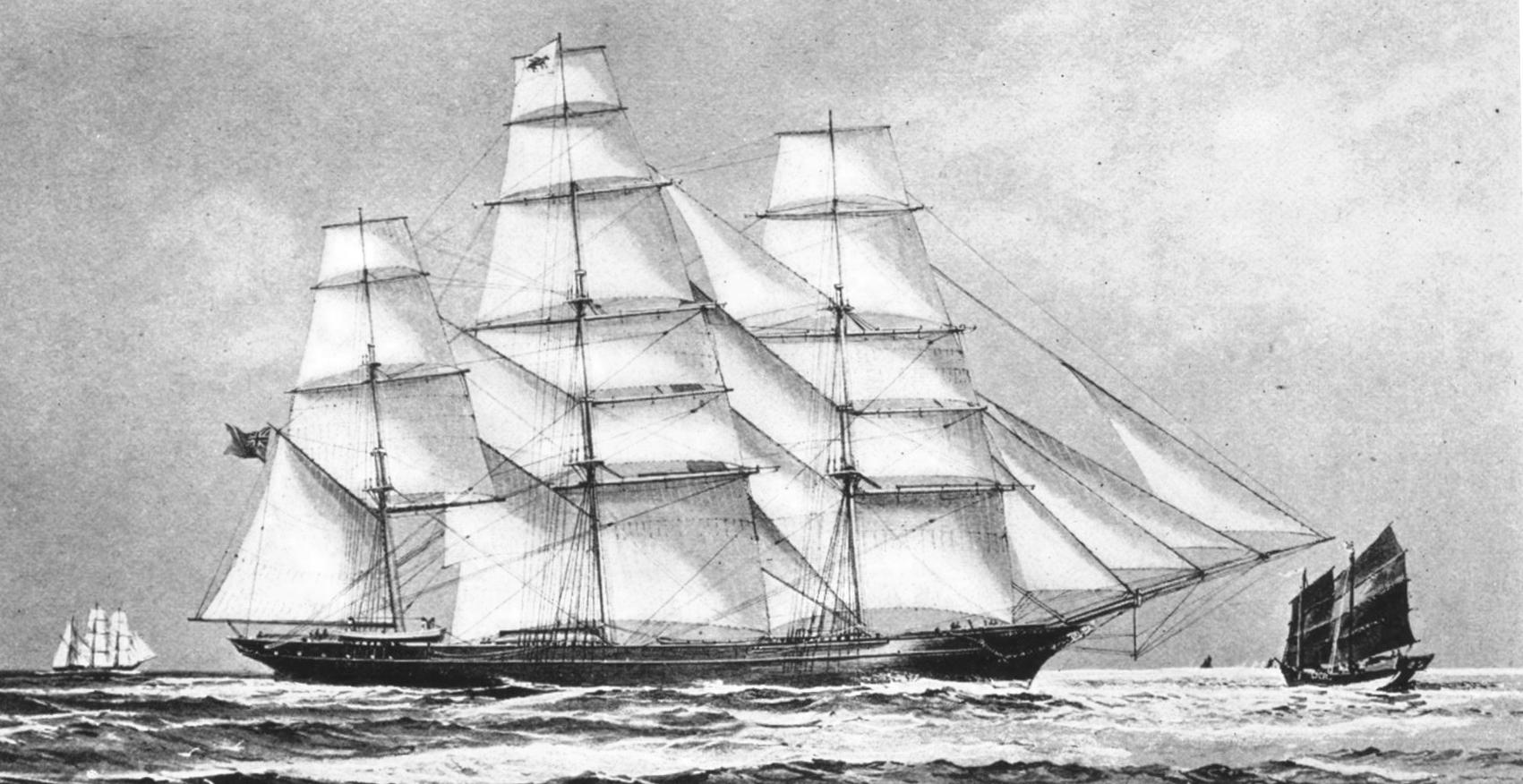
Sir Lancelot (1865) tea clipper.

The company built twenty China tea clippers, the first of which was the Kate Carne in 1855. Many of these went on to win the China Tea Races. The first of these was made of wood but soon composite construction, wood planking on an iron frame, soon became the norm. The Wylo built in 1865 for the London firm of Killick Martin & Company was the last tea clipper made by Steele.

The following is a list of some of the Tea Clippers built by Robert Steele & Company:

Vessel Name	Material	Owners / Agents	Date Built	Period Owned	Net Tonnage	Length Overall (feet)	Breadth (feet)	Depth(feet)
Ariel	Composite	Shaw, Lowther & Maxton	1865	1865-1872	853	197.4	33.9	21
Chinaman	Composite		1865		668			
Ellen Rodger	Wooden	Alexander Rodger & Co	1858	1858-1866	585	155,8	29.4	19.5
Falcon	Wooden	Phillips, Shaw & Lowther	1859	1859-1900	794	191.4	32.2	20
Guinevere			1862		647			
Kaisow	Composite	Alexander Rodger	1868	1868-1891	820	193.2	32	20.3
Kate Carnie	Wooden	Alexander Rodger & C. Carnie	1855	1855-1889	576	148.4	26	19
King Arthur	Iron		1862		699			
Lahloo	Composite	Alexander Rodger & Co	1867	1867- 1872	799	191.6	32.9	19.9
Min	Wooden	Alexander Rodger & Co	1861	1861-1891	629	174.5	29.8	19.3
Serica	Composite	James Findlay	1863	1863-1872	708	185.9	31.1	19.6
Sir Lancelot	Composite	John McCunn	1865	1865-1895	886	197.6	33.7	21
Taeping	Composite	Alexander Rodger	1863	1863-1871	767	183	31.1	19.9
Titania	Composite	Shaw, Lowther, Maxton & Co	1866	1866-1910	879	200	36	21
Wylo	Composite	Killick Martin & Company	1869	1869-1886	829	192.9	32.1	20.2
Young Lochinvar	Wooden	John McDiarmid	1863	1863-1866	724	183.0	31.0	19.0

The firm also continued to build large conventional sailing vessels for use on long-haul routes, such as carrying passengers to Australia. Many immigrants to the colonies first sighted their new homeland from the deck of a Steele-built vessel.

An economic downturn in the early 1880s, and unsuccessful investments by Robert Steele in areas outside of shipbuilding, resulted in the firms closure. The business entered liquidation in 1883. In November of that year the yard was sold to for £40,000 pounds to Scott & Co., the oldest shipbuilder in Greenock. During its lifetime, Steele & Co had built 34 vessels at the Bay of Quick and 273 at the Cartsburn yard (previously called Cartsdyke West).

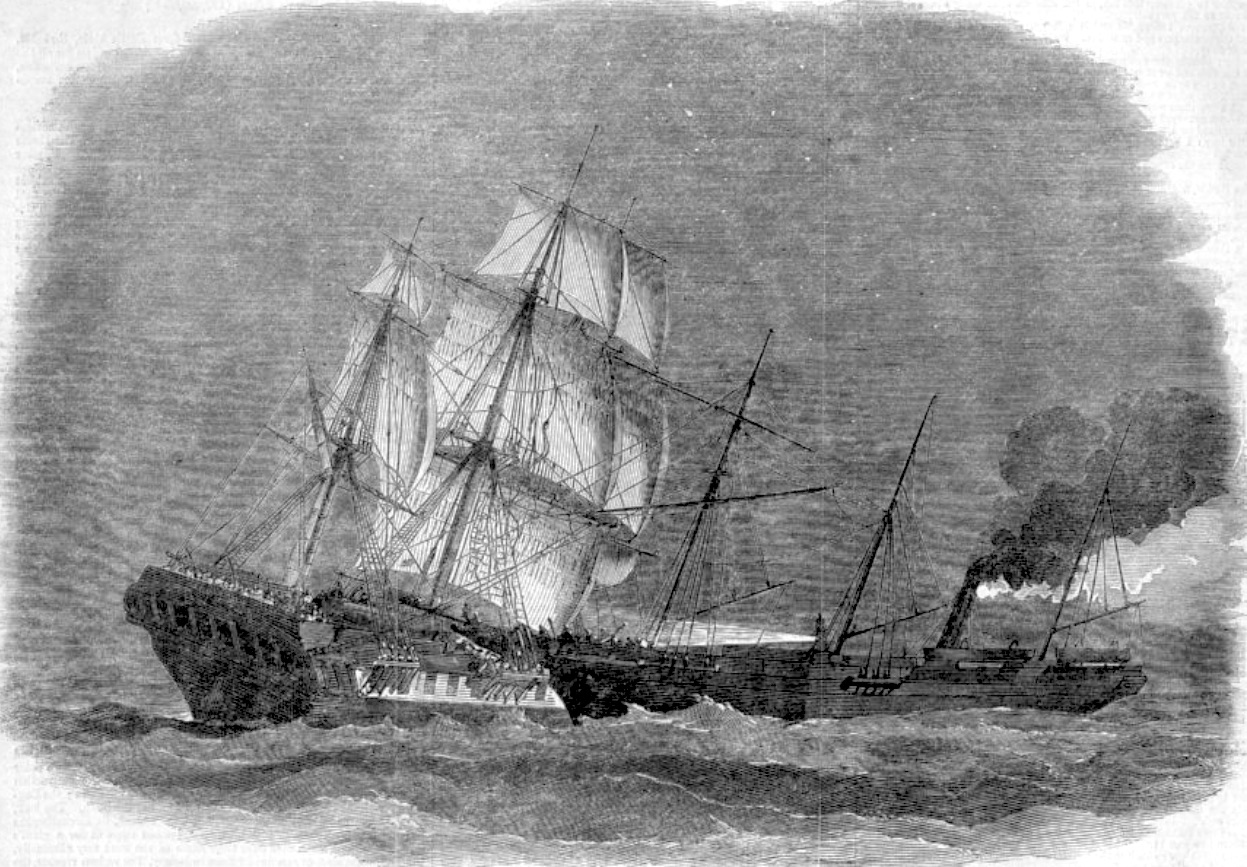

No matter how well they were built, Steele-built vessels were still subject to mishap due to human error and/or extreme weather. An example was when the Irish ferry, ss Mangerton, an 1855 Robert Steele steamship, struck the wooden barque Josephine Willis in 1856

== Achievements ==
The high quality of the firm’s vessels, in terms of their design, materials and workmanship, contributed to the good reputation enjoyed by Scottish shipyards in the 19th century, and in particular, those located on the River Clyde. The firm was prominent in the construction of large wooden-hulled paddle-steamers, building 11 for Cunard and 10 for the Allan Line. In all, they built almost 100 steamships. They are also known as builders of fine sailing vessels, particularly their tea-clippers in the 1860s.

The company was one of the shipbuilders credited with the development of the four-masted barque along with Alexander Stephen and Sons.

Robert Steele built Knock Castle as a private home on the coast near Largs in 1851-2. It still stands today (July 2025).

Robert Steele was sometimes called on to give expert testimony on shipping matters.

One of the notable shipbuilders who began by working for Steele’s before branching out on his own was Charles Connell.

== Gallery ==
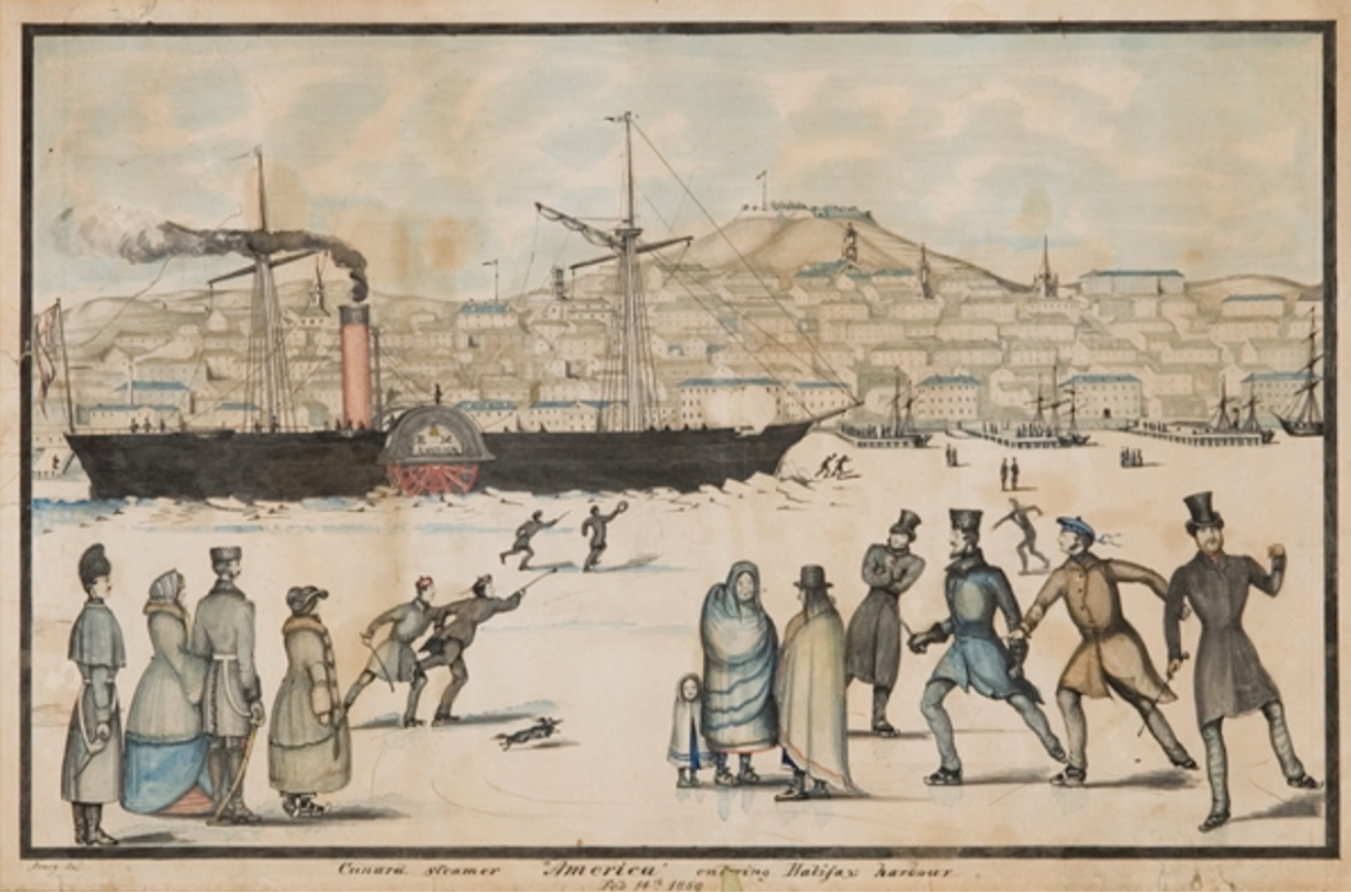
America (1859)

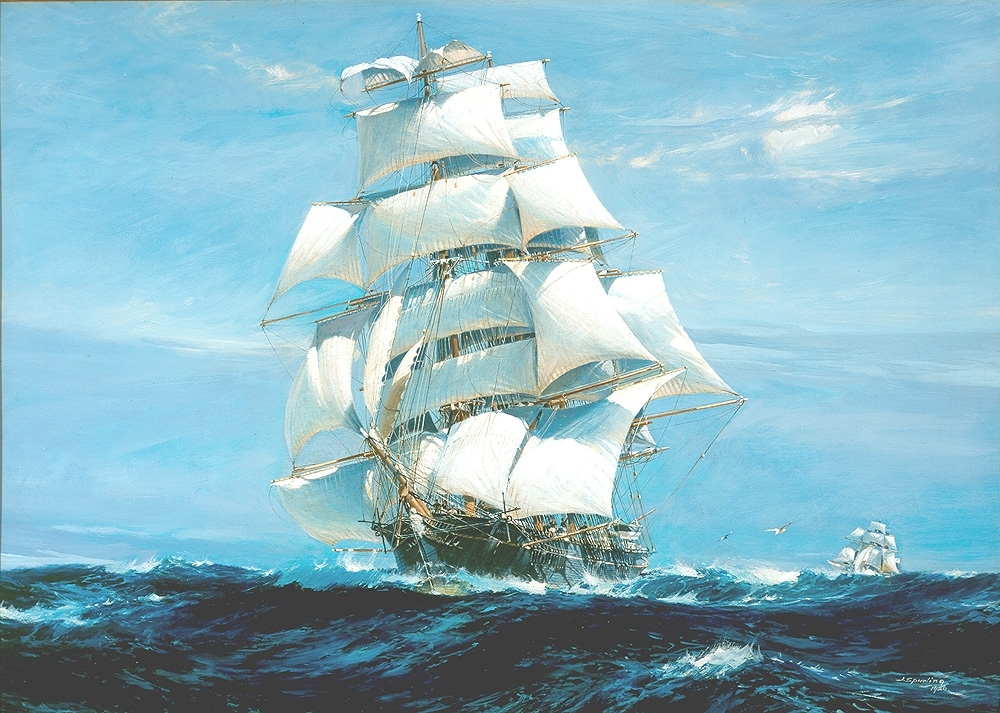
Ariel & Taeping (1866)

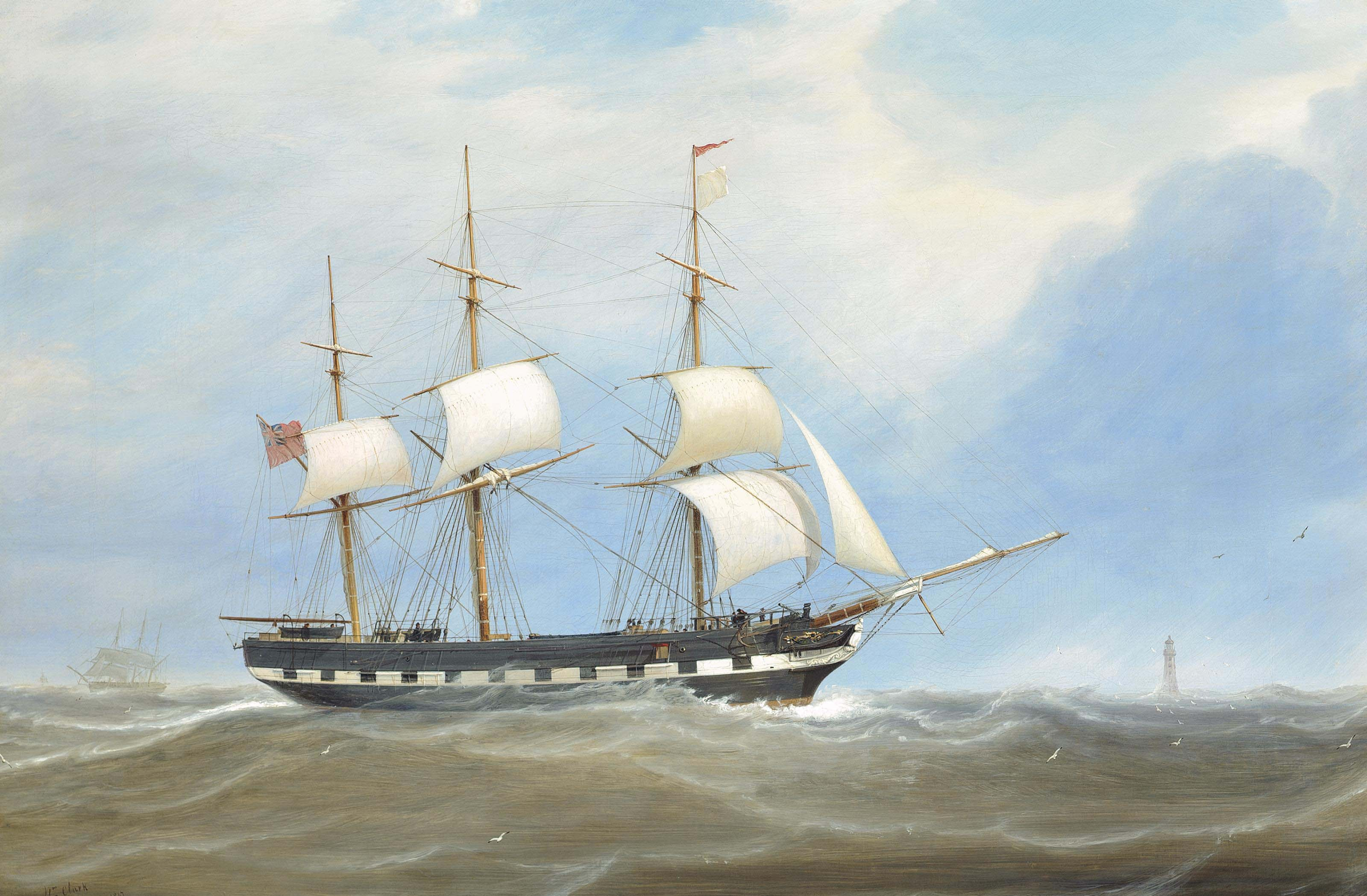
Eliza Stewart (1847)

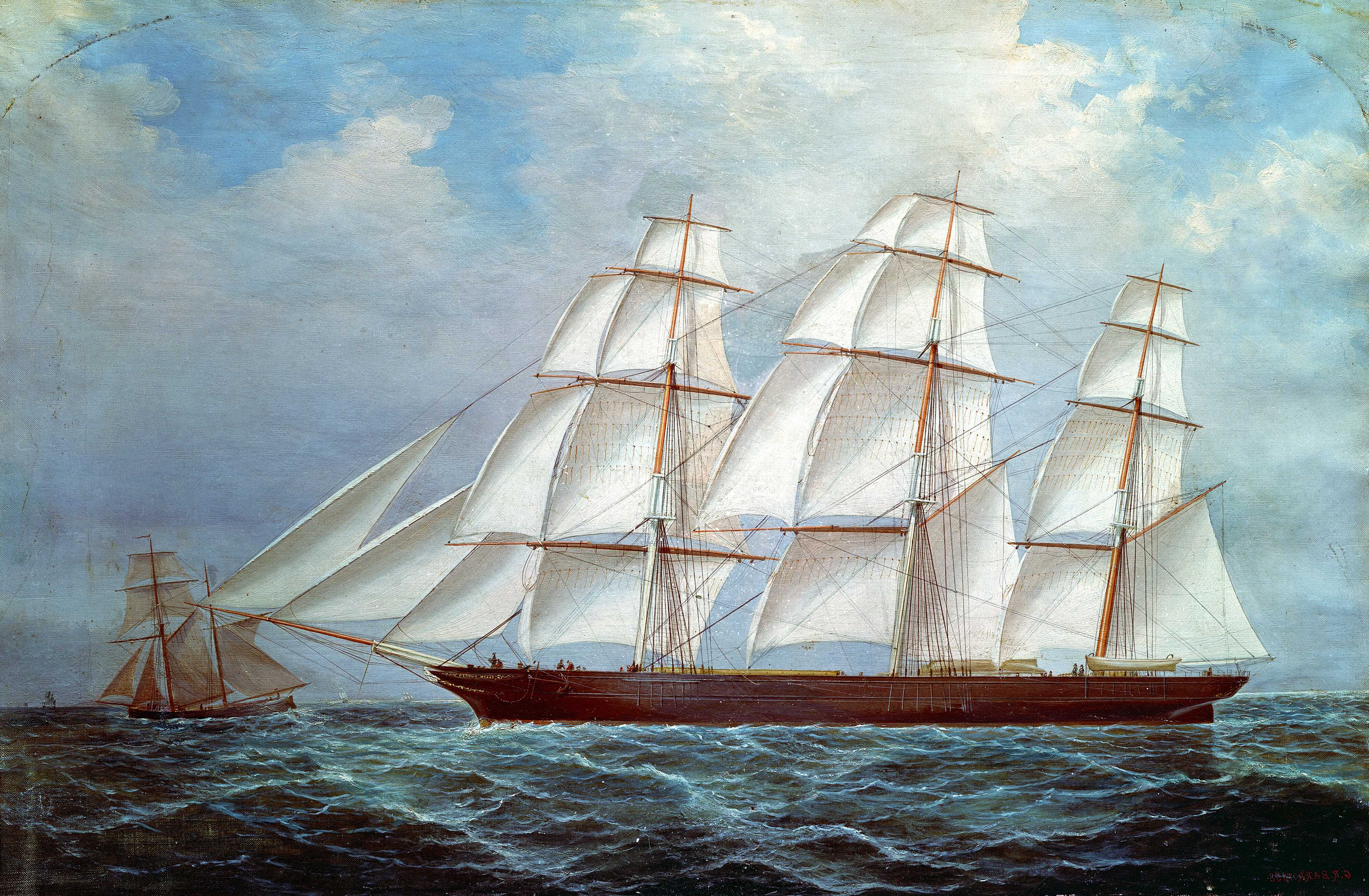
Ellen Rodger (1858)

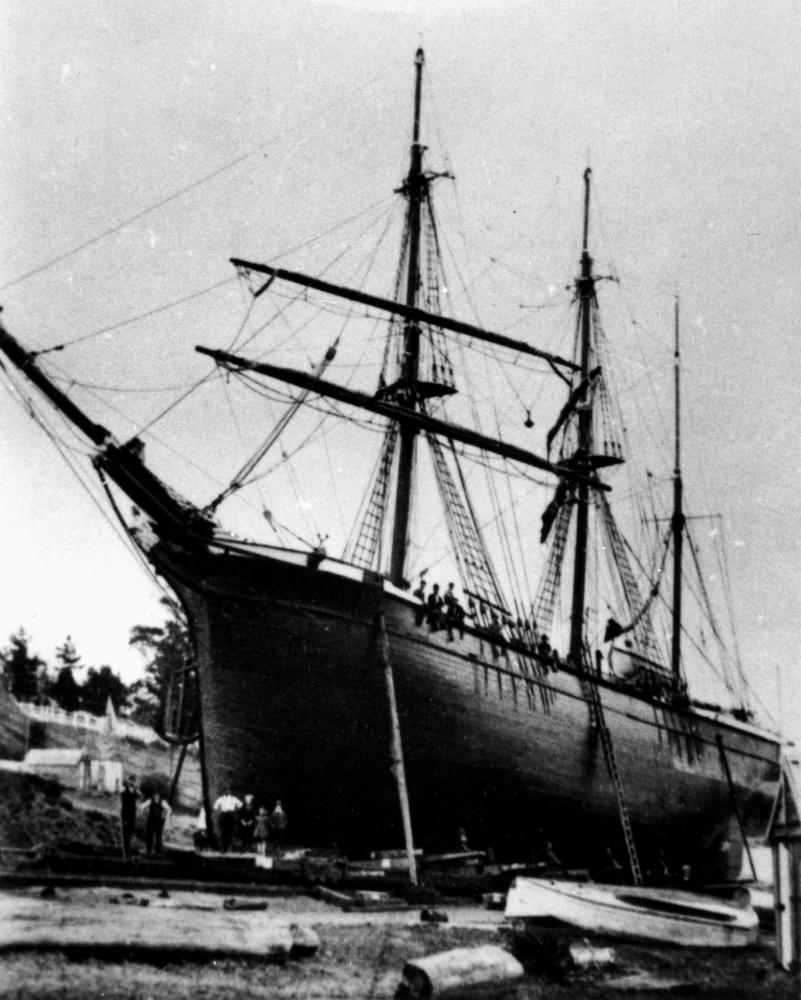
Helen (1865)

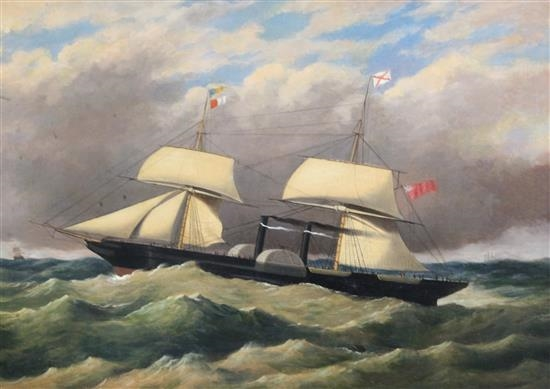
SS La Plata (1852)

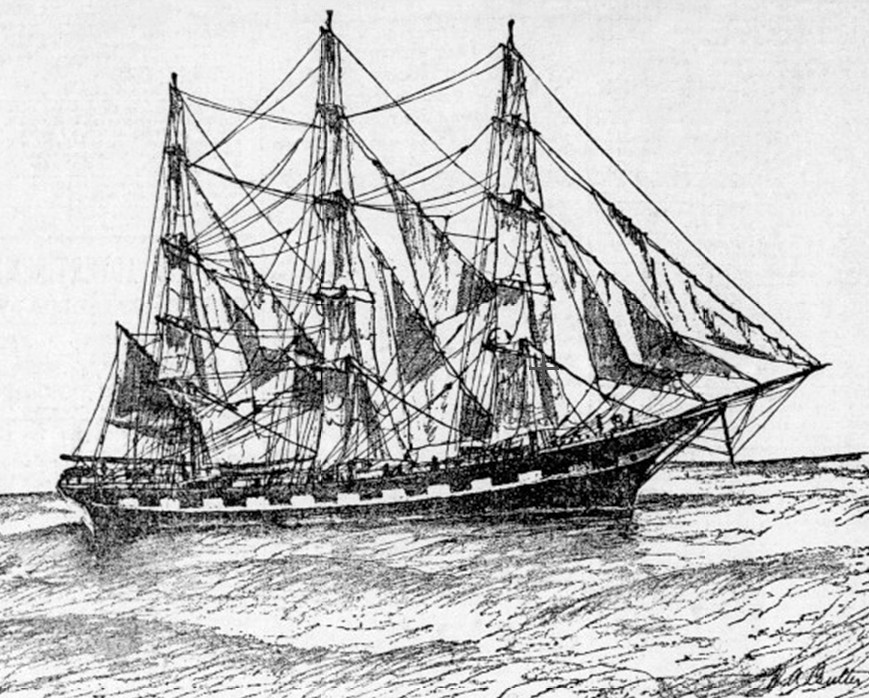
Ravenscrag (1898)

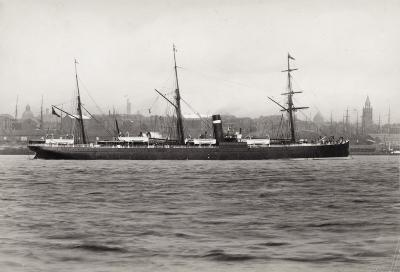
Sardinian (c1890)

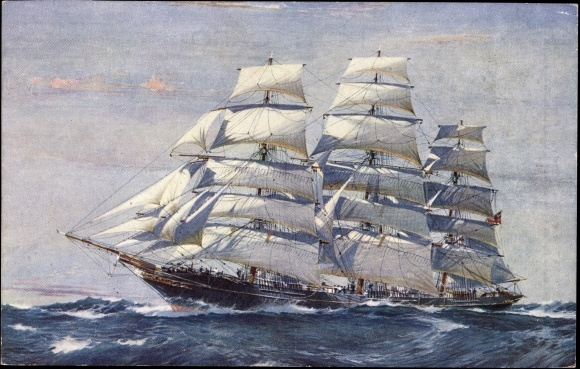
Titania, by Jack Spurling

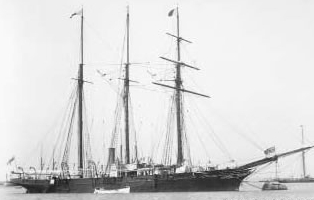
HMS Waterwitch (1892)
