= Bengal Merchant =

A number of ships have been called Bengal Merchant:

- Bengal Merchant, a 570-ton sailing vessel between 1676–1693
- Bengal Merchant, a 390-ton sailing vessel between 1700–1704
- Bengal Merchant, a 503-ton sailing vessel launched in 1812 in Calcutta, hulked in 1856.
