= Bengal (1815 ship) =

UK merchant ship (1815–1847)

History

United Kingdom
- Name: Bengal
- Owner: 1815: Cropper, Benson & Co, Liverpool; 1830: Hugh More
- Builder: Steele & Carswell, Greenock
- Launched: 25 February 1815
- Fate: Wrecked circa 1847

General characteristics
- Tons burthen: 391, or 402, or 415 (bm)

Bengal was launched at Greenock in February 1815. She was the first vessel built in Scotland for the East India trade. She immediately made three voyages to India, sailing under a licence from the British East India Company (EIC). She then traded with the United States, alternating that with other voyages to India. In 1819, on one voyage to India, she was anchored at Calcutta and the venue for a party that resulted in her captain, surgeon, and about a fifth of the guests all dying within days of an unknown disease. She was wrecked in about 1847.

== Career ==
Messrs. Steele and Carswell, of the Bay of Quick, Greenock launched Bengal in February 1815. She was the first vessel built in Scotland for the East India trade.

Bengal first appeared in Lloyd's Register in 1815.

Year	Master	Owner	Trade	Source
1815	R.J.Fayer	Cropper & Co.	Liverpool–Calcutta	LR

In 1813, the EIC had lost its monopoly on the trade between India and Britain. British ships were then free to sail to India or the Indian Ocean under a licence from the EIC.

On 12 June 1815, Bengal, Frayer, master, sailed for Bengal and Madras under a licence from the EIC. Bengal, Fayrer, master, was reported to have arrived at Liverpool from Bengal in June 1816.

In February 1817, Bengal, built at Greenock in 1815, Cuthbertson, master, sailed from Britain, bound for Bombay. She arrived in the Hooghly River in March 1818. By late October she had returned to Liverpool.

On 12 June 1819, Bengal, built at Greenock in 1815, G. Woodward, master, sailed for Fort William, India. She was reported as having arrived at Bengal on 9 July. (Note: The departure date is almost surely in error as this would represent an impossibly rapid journey.) On 25 August she sailed from Bengal to Liverpool. Around 23 September she returned to Calcutta to effect repairs after having sustained damage in the Hooghli on her way to Liverpool. On 5 October it was reported that she had put back leaky and was expected to have to go into dock. On 5 April 1820, Bengal, "late Woodward", arrived back at Liverpool from Bengal.

George Woodward had died on 14 November 1819, at Calcutta, aged 29. On 14 October he had given a party aboard Bengal that resulted in about a dozen deaths from among the 50 guests. A longer account lists eight dead, including Woodward and Bengal's surgeon, and gives Woodward's age as 40. Several other crew also died. "Effluvia" from the 17,000 buffalo horns that made up her cargo, was suspected, but this suspicion did not arise until after Bengal had sailed and could not be conveyed to her.

Year	Master	Owner	Trade	Source & notes
1820	R.J.Fayer; Emerson	Cropper & Co.	Liverpool–Calcutta; Liverpool–Savannah	LR
1821	J.Emerson; J.Pearce	Cropper & Co.	Liverpool–Savannah	LR
1822	J.Pearce	Cropper & Co.	Liverpool–New York	LR
1823	J.Pearce	Cropper & Co.	Liverpool–New York; Liverpool–Calcutta	LR; damages repaired 1823

On 29 September 1823, Bengal, Pearce, master, sailed for Calcutta. On 20 August 1824, Bengal arrived at St Helena from Bengal. The next day she sailed for London. On 18 October she arrived back at Liverpool.

Lloyd's Register's list of licensed voyages reported that on 3 June 1824, Bengal, Pearce, master, had sailed for Calcutta. This appears to be an error.

On 3 February 1825, Bengal, M'Leod, master sailed for Calcutta. On 17 November she arrived at the Cape of Good Hope from Bengal, and sailed for Liverpool on the 20th for Liverpool.

Year	Master	Owner	Trade	Source & notes
1826	[Norman] M'Leod	Cropper & Co.	Liverpool–Calcutta	LR; small repairs 1825
1828	M'Leod; R.Atkins	Cropper & Co.	Liverpool–Calcutta	LR; small repairs 1825
1829	J.Bisset	Cropper & Co.	Liverpool–Charleston	LR; small repairs 1825
1830	R.Atkins; J.Bisset	Cropper & Co.	Liverpool–Bombay	LR; small repairs 1825
1832	J.Bisset	W.Mure	Liverpool–Mobile	LR; small repairs 1825 and 1830
1834	Tulan			LR
1836	J.Tulan; Teulon	Mure	Liverpool	LR; new deck 1831, new wales and topsides 1833, & damages repaired 1837
1839	Teulon; T.Hicks	Mure	Liverpool; Liverpool–Maranham	LR; new deck 181, new wales and topsides 1833, & damages repaired 1837
1842	T.Hicks; Gale	Mure; Brown & Co.	Liverpool–Maranham; Liverpool–Quebec	LR; new deck 1831, new wales and topsides 1833, & damages repaired 1837
1846	Gale	Brown & Co.		LR

== Fate ==
The volume of Lloyd's Register for 1846 carried the annotation "Wrecked" by Bengal's name.
