= French aviso Sésostris =

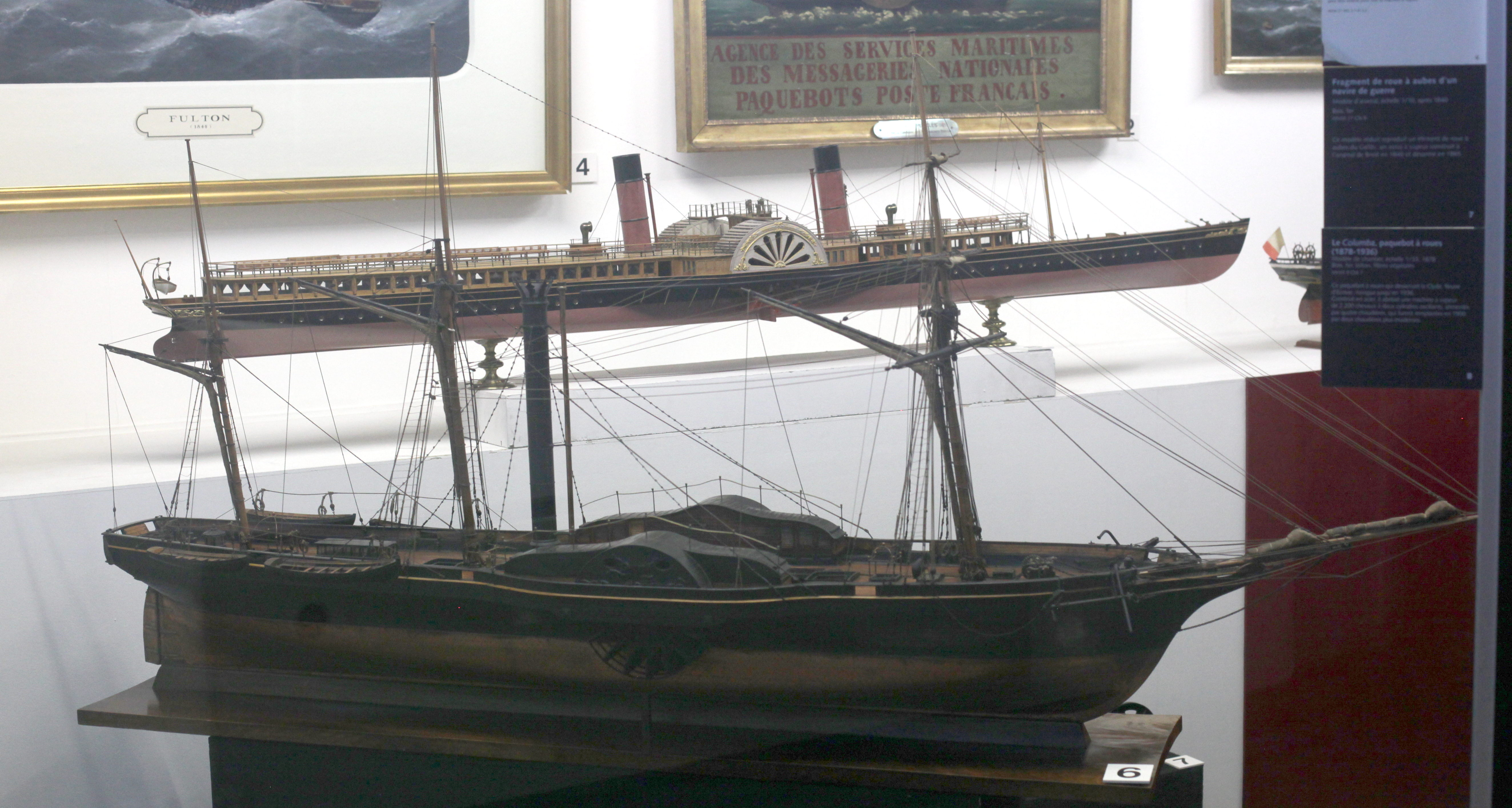
- Scale model of Sésostris on display at the Musée national de la Marine in Paris

History

France
- Name: Sésostris
- Namesake: Ambiguous (Note: Sésostris is the French transliteration of Sesostris or Senusret)
- Builder: Cherbourg
- Laid down: 21 August 1835
- Launched: 27 August 1836
- Acquired: 29 December 1852
- Commissioned: 11 January 1852
- Stricken: 25 October 1861
- Fate: Broken up 1896

General characteristics
- Class & type: Rhamses-class steamer
- Displacement: 913 tonnes
- Propulsion: Schooner three-masted sail plan; 640 HP steam engine
- Armament: 6 guns; from 1859: 4 mortars

Sésostris was a paddle steamer, initially built as a postal steamer for the Near Eastern service of the Messageries Maritimes. In 1852, she became a steam aviso in the French Navy.

== Career ==
From 1853 to 1854, Sésostris cruised off Western Africa under Lieutenant Chastenet.

In 1855, she was re-armed with mortars for the Crimean War, notably taking part in the Battle of Kinburn.

In 1859 and 1860, she performed oceanographic surveys off Newfoundland.

Struck in 1861, she was used as a floating mechanics workshop until 1894. She was eventually broken up in 1896.

== Legacy ==
A model of Sésostris is on display at the Musée national de la Marine in Paris.
