= Bengal (East Indiaman) =

Two ships named Bengal sailed as East Indiamen for the British East India Company (EIC). Both were ill-fated.

- Bengal (1799 EIC ship) made four complete voyages but foundered with no trace while homeward bound from the fifth.
- Bengal (1811 EIC ship) made one voyage for the EIC, but was burnt on the homeward leg of her second voyage.

In addition, several other vessels named Bengal had a connection to the EIC, though they were not Indiamen.

- Bengal was a galley built in 1722 to serve as an escort ship at Bombay to protect Indiamen from pirates on the Malabar Coast. A pirate fleet captured her in 1730.
- Bengal was a 74-gun ship that the EIC had built and that it donated to the British Royal Navy. The Navy renamed her HMS Ganges.
