= Walmer Castle (1836 ship) =

History

United Kingdom
- Name: Walmer Castle
- Namesake: Walmer Castle
- Owner: George Green
- Builder: Green, Blackwall.
- Launched: 18 February 1836
- Fate: Last listed 1867

General characteristics
- Tons burthen: Old Act: 620, or 62057/94, or 656 (bm); New Act: 742(bm)
- Length: 133 ft 0 in (40.5 m)
- Beam: 27 ft 3 in (8.3 m)
- Depth of hold: 17 ft 6 in (5.3 m)

Walmar Castle was launched in 1836 as an East Indiaman. She made 16 voyages two India, and at least two to Australia with migrants, and was sold about 14 October 1855. New owners then traded with China. She was last listed in 1867 with data unchanged since 1857.

== Career ==
Walmer Castle first appeared in Lloyd's Register (LR), but with minimal information.

Year	Master	Owner	Trade	Source & notes
1836	W.Riddell		London	LR
1839	Boucher	Green	London–Bombay	LR
1840	Martin; Gimlett	Green	London–Bombay; London	LR
1841	Gimlett; Campbell	Green	London; London–Bombay	LR
1848	Campbell; J.Thorn	R.Green	London	LR; small repairs 1848

Walmer Castle, John Thorne, master, sailed from the Downs on 5 September 1846 and arrived at Port Jackson on 23 December 1846. She was carrying eleven cabin passengers, three passengers in intermediate, and ten passenger in steerage.

Walmer Castle sailed from Plymouth on 12 September 1848 and arrived at Sydney on 30 December 1848. She was under the command of Joseph Thorne, and had Dr John Neill Waugh as Surgeon-Superintendent. She had a crew of 50, ten passengers in cabin accommodation and 301 government=sponsored emigrants in steerage. These included 57 married couples, 53 single men, 43 single men, 49 boys and 28 girls from 1–14 years of age, 11 male and three female infants. Three female infants died as a consequence of non-contagious infant diseases; one crewman died on 15 September 1848.

Year	Master	Owner	Trade	Source & notes
1850	Aldham	R.Green	London–Madras	LR; small repairs 1848
1851	Aldham; W.Price	R.Green & Co.	London–Calcutta	LR; small repairs 1848
1854	W.Price	R.Green & Co.	London–Australia	LR; small repairs 1848

On 12 October 1855. Walmer Castle sailed from Spithead for the Thames. Green & Co. sold her a few days later.

Year	Master	Owner	Trade	Source & notes
1856	De StCroix	Shepherd & Co.	London–China	LR

== Fate ==
Walmer Castle was last listed in 1867 with data unchanged since 1857.
