= Joseph Walter =

English painter (1783–1856)

- Painting of a brig by Joseph Walter, 1838, from the Royal Museums Greenwich
- Born: 1783; Bristol
- Died: 1856 (aged 72–73); Bristol
- Known for: Marine art, Oil painting, Watercolour

Joseph Walter (1783–1856) was an English marine painter in oils and watercolour, working at Bristol and Portishead. He gained notice for his portrayals of Brunel's steamships Great Western and Great Britain.

== Life ==
Walter was born in Bristol and died there, but was living in Portishead at the time that he exhibited his first known work, View from Portishead towards Wales (1832). This was at the Bristol Institution in 1832, in the first exhibition of the Bristol Society of Artists. He is not known to have been associated with the Bristol School of artists in the 1820s. However surviving sketches suggest that he did take part in the revival of the school's sketching meetings in the 1830s. His drawing technique shows similarities to that of the leading Bristol School artist Samuel Jackson.

Walter's subjects included shipping at Bristol, Southampton, Malta and Saint Lucia. He also portrayed Dutch vessels in the style of the Dutch artists Van de Velde and son, for example in Dutch vessels in a fresh breeze (c. 1851). He exhibited at the Royal Academy from 1837, and also at the Society of British Artists.

== Brunel's steamships ==
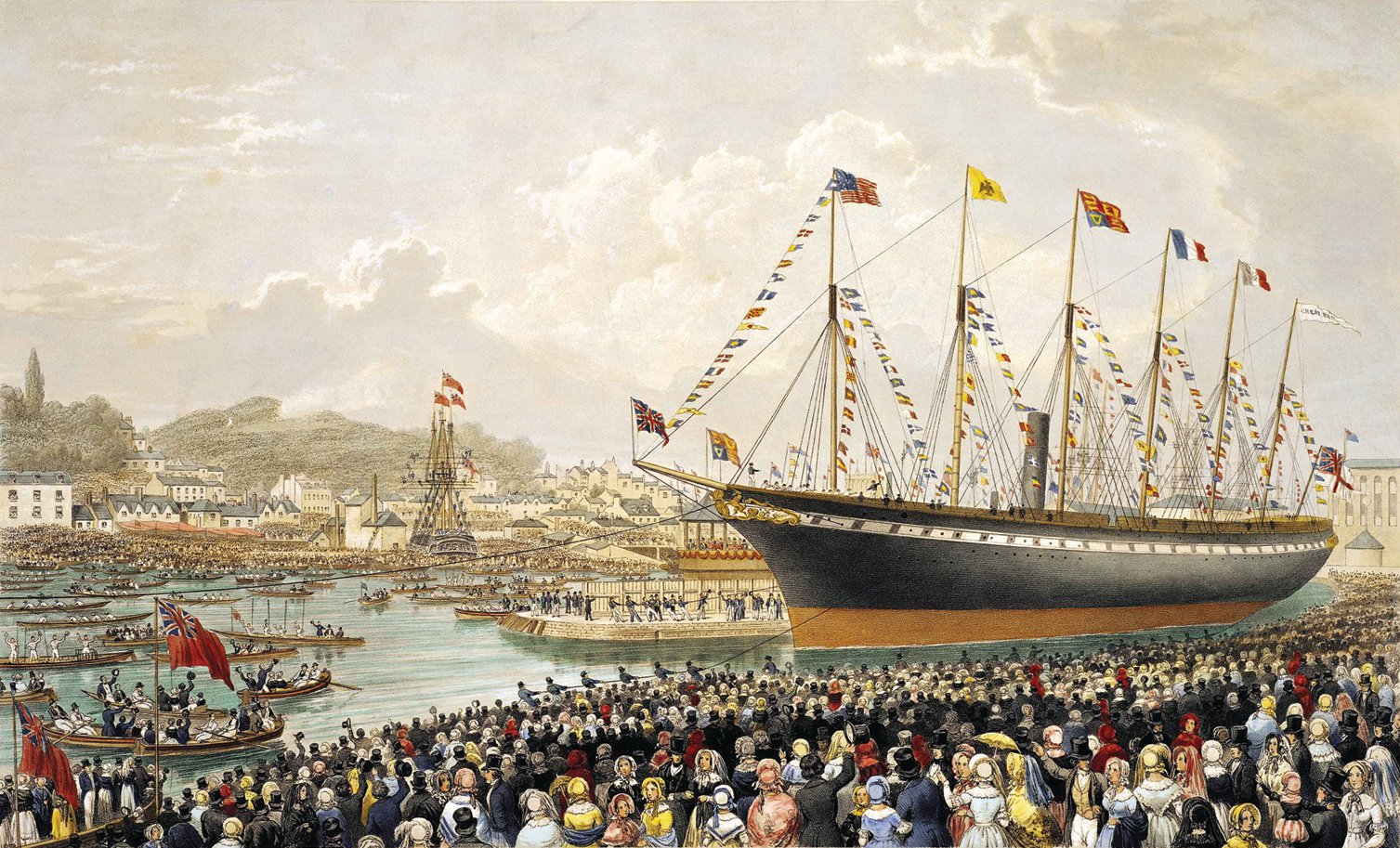
Launch of the Great Britain Steam Ship at Bristol, July 19th 1843 (detail)

Walter gained notice as a result of his numerous portrayals of Brunel's steamships Great Western and Great Britain. These included the oil painting The Great Western passing Portishead on her maiden voyage to New York, 8 April 1838 (c. 1839) and the lithograph Launch of the Great Britain Steam Ship at Bristol, July 19th 1843. Later he depicted in watercolour the grounding of the Great Britain in 1846 which put the Great Western Steamship Company out of business.
