= Ardaseer (1836 ship) =

History

British India
- Name: Ardaseer
- Namesake: Ardaseer Dady
- Owner: Cerssetjee Cowasjee
- Builder: Bombay Dockyard
- Launched: 30 June 1836
- Fate: Burnt 4 April 1851

General characteristics
- Tons burthen: 422 (bm)
- Length: Overall:117 ft 0 in (35.7 m); Keel:96 ft 0 in (29.3 m)
- Beam: 29 ft 6 in (9.0 m)
- Sail plan: Barque

Ardaseer was an opium clipper built at Bombay Dockyard in 1836. A fire on 4 April 1851, destroyed her as she was on a voyage from China to Calcutta via Singapore.

== Career ==
Ardaseer carried Malwah and other opium from India to China, and more generally was in the China trade between Calcutta and China.

Ardaseer, Macintyre, master, had been sailing from Bombay to China when she put into Sourabaya on 9 January 1841. She had encountered a gale near the Caramata Passage that had taken away her topmast, foremast, sails, yards, etc. Her hull and cargo were not damaged and after repairs she completed her voyage.

On her second voyage, in 1841, Ardaseer was again dismasted. She left Singapore on 2 November. On 16 November, she encountered a typhoon and to save her Macintyre had the crew cut away her masts. When the gale subsided he tried to make for Manila under jury-masts, but was unable to do so. Ardaseer returned to Singapore on 9 December.

Ardaseer weathered another typhoon on 15 September 1849, this time without damage.

== Loss ==
Ardaseer, Henry Lovett, master, was on her way from China to Calcutta via Singapore on 4 April 1851, when she caught fire 100 nautical miles (190 km) off Penang. Unable to defeat the fire, her crew and passengers took to the boats and the next day the Bremen ship Liebnitz rescued them. Ardaseer had been carrying specie and this was put on her boats; the crew and passengers lost all their possessions. Leibnitz landed the people it had rescued at Penang on the 12th. Lovett believed the fire was the result of spontaneous combustion as the fire had started aft where the flammable cargo had been stored.
