= List of ship launches in 1865 =

The list of ship launches in 1865 is a chronological list of ships launched in 1865.

Date	Ship	Class	Builder	Location	Country	Notes
3 January	Albert Victor	East Indiaman	Humber Iron Works Company	Hull	United Kingdom	For private owner.
7 January	Sorabjee Jamsetjee Jeejeebhoy	East Indiaman	Messrs. Laird	Birkenhead	United Kingdom	For Messrs. T. Cardwell & Sons.
7 January	Nouveau Monde	Steamship	Chantiers Scott	Saint-Nazaire	France	For Compagnie Générale Transatlantique
11 January	Devonport	Full-rigged ship	John Smurthwaite	Pallion	United Kingdom	For T. Harrison.
11 January	Star of the West	Barque	Pile, Hay & Co	Sunderland	United Kingdom	For Pardew & Co.
12 January	Erik	Whaler	Messrs. Alexander Stephen & Sons	Dundee	United Kingdom	For private owners.
12 January	Hibernia	Steamship	Messrs. Gourlay Bros.	Dundee	United Kingdom	For Dundee, Perth and London Shipping Co.
12 January	Tarifa	Steamship	Messrs. James & George Thompson	Govan	United Kingdom	For Messrs. Burns & MacIver.
12 January	The Lady James	Paddle steamer	Tyne Iron Shipbuilding Co	Newcastle upon Tyne	United Kingdom	For Tyne General Ferry Co.
12 January	Tyne Queen	Steamship	Tyne Iron Shipbuilding Co.	Newcastle upon Tyne	United Kingdom	For Glover Bros.
13 January	Aird	Barque	Francis Robertson	Peterhead	United Kingdom	For private owner.
17 January	Alexandria	East Indiaman	Humber Ironworks and Shipbuilding Company	Kingston upon Hull	United Kingdom	For private owner.
25 January	Countess of Eglington	Steamship	Messrs. Barclay, Curle & Co.	Stobcross	United Kingdom	For Messrs. R. Henderson & Sons.
26 January	Mary Helen	Paddle steamer	Messrs. Wingate	Whiteinch	United Kingdom	For John Wilkie.
26 January	Shanghai	Corvette	Chantiers Dubigeon	Nantes	France	For Confederate States Navy.
27 January	Conoid	Brigantine	Messrs. Carnegie & Matthews	Peterhead	United Kingdom	For Messrs Scott & Leslie and others.
28 January	Avoca	Steamship	Messrs. Robinson & Co.	Cork	United Kingdom	For Messrs. Malcolmson & Co.
28 January	British Princess	East Indiaman	Messrs. Clover & Co.	Birkenhead	United Kingdom	For British Shipowners' Co.
28 January	Royal Adelaide	Merchantman	William Patterson Shipbuilders	Bristol	United Kingdom	For Gibbs, Bright & Co.
30 January	Staffa	Steamship	Messrs. S. & W. Morton & Co.	Leith	United Kingdom	For London and Edinburgh Shipping Co.
30 January	Tocopilla	Merchantman	Messrs. Alexander Stephen & Sons	Kelvinhaugh	United Kingdom	For Messrs. Lean, Jase & Co.
31 January	British Peer	Barque	Harland & Wolff	Belfast, Ireland	United Kingdom	For British Shipping Company.
31 January	General Lee	East Indiaman	Messrs. Holderness & Chilton	Liverpool	United Kingdom	For Messrs. J. & W. Wright.
31 January	Helicon	Despatch vessel		Portsmouth Dockyard	United Kingdom	For Royal Navy.
31 January	Sir Bartle Frere	Steamship	Messrs. Blackwood & Gordon	Port Glasgow	United Kingdom	For Bombay Coast & River Steam Navigation Co.
January	Ayr	Barque		River Clyde	United Kingdom	For Arrow Clipper Line.
January	Aziziye	Osmaniye-class ironclad	Messrs. Robert Napier & Sons	Govan	United Kingdom	For Ottoman Navy.
January	Daisy	Schooner	Mr. Bishton	Chester	United Kingdom	For J. Davison.
January	Gamma	Barque	Messrs. Cox	Bideford	United Kingdom	For Messrs. Bath & Co.
January	Peedee	Gunboat	Peedee Naval Shipyard	South Carolina	Confederate States of America	For Confederate States Navy.
January	Texas	Tennessee-class ironclad		Richmond, Virginia	Confederate States of America	For Confederate States Navy.
January	Wilken	Schooner		River Spey	United Kingdom	For private owner.
1 February	Edina	Steamship	Messrs. Aitken & Mansel	Whiteinch	United Kingdom	For Messrs. James Currie & Co.
9 February	Alvington	Barque	William Watson	Sunderland	United Kingdom	For Balkwill & Co.
9 February	Cecilia	Schooner	Messrs. J. & W. Geddie	Banff	United Kingdom	For private owner.
9 February	Da Marie	Clipper		Sunderland	United Kingdom	For private owner.
9 February	Duke of Athole	Full-rigged ship	Messrs. Denny & Rankin	Dumbarton	United Kingdom	For Messrs Montgomerie & Greenhorne.
11 February	Napoleon III	Paddle steamer	Thames Iron Works Co.	Millwall	United Kingdom	For Compagnie Générale Transatlantique.
11 February	Rhone	Ocean liner	Millwall Iron Works	Millwall	United Kingdom	For Royal Mail Steam Packet Company.
14 February	Challenge	Paddle steamer		Dumbarton	United Kingdom	For private owner.
14 February	Fairlie	Merchantman	Messrs. Hedderwick	Govan	United Kingdom	For Messrs. Sandbach, Tirne & Co.
14 February	Nile	Tug	Humber Ironworks and Shipbuilding Company (Limited)	Hull	United Kingdom	For Messrs. Ellison & Co.
14 February	St. Mungo	Steamship	Humber Ironworks and Shipbuilding Company	Hull	United Kingdom	For Messrs. Gilmour, Rankin, Strang & Co.
14 February	Sun Gleam	Steamship	Humber Ironworks and Shipbuilding Company	Hull	United Kingdom	For J. Smurthwaite.
15 February	Curlew	Paddle steamer	Messrs. Jones, Quiggin & Co.	Liverpool	United Kingdom	For private owner.
15 February	Noor el Hooda	Steamship	Messrs. Jones, Quiggin & Co.	Liverpool	United Kingdom	For private owner.
15 February	Plover	Paddle steamer	Messrs. Jones, Quiggin & Co.	Liverpool	United Kingdom	For private owner.
15 February	Snipe	Paddle steamer	Messrs. Jones, Quiggin & Co.	Liverpool	United Kingdom	For private owner.
15 February	Widgeon	Paddle steamer	Messrs. Jones, Quiggin & Co.	Liverpool	United Kingdom	For private owner.
16 February	Minstrel	Britomat-class gunboat		Haslar	United Kingdom	For Royal Navy.
23 February	Dione	Steam yacht	Bowdler, Chaffer & Co.	Seacombe	United Kingdom	For Sir James Ramsden.
24 February	Leon Crespo	Clipper	Messrs. Alexander Stephen & Sons	Kelvinhaugh	United Kingdom	For Messrs. Bain Bros.
25 February	Ada Wilson	Steamship	Preston Iron Shipbuilding Company	Marsh End	United Kingdom	For Ribble Navigation Company.
25 February	Wakefield	Full-rigged ship	Isle of Man Shipbuilding Co.	Ramsey	Isle of Man	For private owner.
27 February	Actæa	Barque	Messrs. D. Burns & Co.	Aberdeen	United Kingdom	For Messrs Pothonier, Tilsley & Co.
27 February	Danube	Steamship	Millwall Iron Works Co.	Millwall	United Kingdom	For Royal Mail Steam Packet Company.
28 February	Jane Bacon	Steamship	Bowdler, Chaffer & Co.	Seacombe	United Kingdom	For John Bacon.
28 February	New Blessing	Brigantine	Daniel Griffiths	Portmadoc	United Kingdom	For private owner.
28 February	The Magna Charta	Brig	Messrs. Pierce & Ebenezer Roberts	Portmadoc	United Kingdom	For Evan Hughes & Bros.
February	Delaware	Steamship	Messrs. Tod & MacGregor	Glasgow	United Kingdom	For private owner.
February	Kœnig William III	Steamship	Messrs. Randolph, Elder & Co.	Glasgow	United Kingdom	For private owner.
February	Nonpareil	Barque	J. & E. Lumsden	Pallion	United Kingdom	For J. Marshall.
February	Scotland	Steamship	Messrs. Palmer	Jarrow	United Kingdom	For private owner.
1 March	Mongolia	Steamship	Messrs. Scott & Co.	Greenock	United Kingdom	For Peninsular and Oriental Steam Navigation Company.
1 March	Tantallan Castle	Merchantman	Messrs. Steele & Co.	Greenock	United Kingdom	For Messrs. Donald Currie & Co.
2 March	Paquete de los Villos	Steamship	Messrs M'Nab & Co.	Greenock	United Kingdom	For private owner.
7 March	Valencia	Steamship	Messrs. J. & R. Swan	Kelvin Dock	United Kingdom	For Messrs. Mories, Munro & Co.
11 March	Margaret & Helen	Schooner	M'Lea	Rothesay	United Kingdom	For Messrs. J. & R. Callender.
11 March	Negapatam	Steamship	Messrs Hedderwick & Co.	Govan	United Kingdom	For Madras and Colombo Steam Navigation Company (Limited).
11 March	Sovereign	Barque	William Beedle	Aberdeen	United Kingdom	For William Beedle.
14 March	Pallas	Battery ship		Woolwich Dockyard	United Kingdom	For Royal Navy.
14 March	Patrick Denny	Clipper	Messrs. John Duthie, Sons, & Co.	Footdee	United Kingdom	For Messrs. Patrick Henderson & Co.
14 March	Peter Denny	Clipper	Messrs. John Duthie, Sons, & Co.	Footdee	United Kingdom	For Messrs. Patrick Henderson & Co.
14 March	Victoria	Cutter	John White	cowes	United Kingdom	For Board of Customs.
15 March	Crusader	Merchantman	Messrs. Charles Connell & Co.	Overnewton	United Kingdom	For Messrs. John Lidgett & Sons.
16 March	Kiltearn	Merchantman	Messrs. Hedderwick & Co.	Govan	United Kingdom	For Messrs. Sandbach, Tinnie & Co.
17 March	John Ericsson	John Ericsson-class monitor	Motala Verkstad	Norrköping	Sweden	For Royal Swedish Navy.
18 March	Chinaman	Full-rigged ship	Messrs. R. Steele & Co.	Greenock	United Kingdom	For private owner.
21 March	Magna Charta	Collier	Messrs. Palmer	Newcastle upon Tyne	United Kingdom	For Messrs. Phillips & Co.
21 March	Miranda	Steamship	Messrs. Palmer	Jarrow	United Kingdom	For Messrs. Pickernell Bros.
21 March	Not named	Steamship	Tyne Shipbuilding Company	Newcastle upon Tyne	United Kingdom	For Messrs. M. J. Wilson & Co.
22 March	Gerona	Screw frigate	Arsenal de Cartagena	Cartagena	Spain	For Spanish Navy.
24 March	Africa	Steamship	Messrs. Palmer	Jarrow	United Kingdom	For Messrs. Rubertini.
25 March	Fortune	Tug	James Tetlow	Boston, Massachusetts	United States	For private owner.
25 March	Yangtzee	Steamship	Messrs. William Denny & Bros.	Dumbarton	United Kingdom	For private owner.
25 March	Zoe	Barque	William Doxford	Sunderland	United Kingdom	For Candlish & Co.
27 March	Agincourt	Minotaur-class ironclad	Messrs. Laird, Son, & Co.	Birkenhead	United Kingdom	For Royal Navy.
27 March	Chusan	Chinaman	Woodside Graving Dock Company (Limited)	Birkenhead	United Kingdom	For British and Eastern Shipping Co.
27 March	Medway	Steamship	T. R. Oswald	Pallion	United Kingdom	For Messrs. Temperley, Baster & Darke.
27 March	Orange Girl	Schooner	John Barter	Brixham	United Kingdom	For Jasper Bartlett, William Penny and others.
27 March	Witchcraft	Schooner	Samuel White	Cowes	United Kingdom	For T. Broadwood.
28 March	British Nation	Steamship	Messrs. Walpole, Webb & Bewley	Dublin	United Kingdom	For British Shipowners' Company.
28 March	Mary Nickson	Schooner	William Allsup	Preston	United Kingdom	For James Nickson.
28 March	Phillis	Barque	John Thompson	Sunderland	United Kingdom	For Mark Foreman.
28 March	Sarah	Brig	John Jones	Morben	United Kingdom	For John Evans.
28 March	Zanga	Barque	Messrs. D. & A. Fullerton	Ayr	United Kingdom	For private owner.
29 March	Bute	Paddle steamer	Messrs. Caird & Co.	Greenock	United Kingdom	For Wemyss Bay Steamboat Co.
29 March	Cherub	Britomart-class gunboat		Haslar	United Kingdom	For Royal Navy.
29 March	The Star of Hope	Barque	Messrs. Stephen & Forbes	Peterhead	United Kingdom	For John Young.
30 March	Arno	Paddle steamer	Messrs. Caird & Co.	Greenock	United Kingdom	For West India Royal Mail Steam Packet Co.
30 March	Verulam	Barque	Messrs. John Wray & Son	Burton Stather	United Kingdom	For Messrs. Bullard, King & Co.
30 March	Wennington	Merchantman	Lune Shipbuilding Co.	Lancaster	United Kingdom	For Lancaster Waggon Co.
30 March	Yuma	Casco-class monitor	Alexander Swift & Co.	Cincinnati, Ohio	United States	For United States Navy.
March	Pacific	Barque	James Hardie	Southwick	United Kingdom	For J. & J. Waite.
March	Unus	Collier	Readhead & Softley.	South Shields	United Kingdom	For Hodge & Williamson.
9 April	Rabboni	Tug	George Middlemas	San Francisco, California	United States	For private owner.
11 April	Affondatore	Ironclad ram	Harrison	Millwall	United Kingdom	For Regia Marina.
11 April	Uruguay	Barque	Messrs. M'Millan & Sons	Dumbarton	United Kingdom	For Messrs. Donaldson Bros.
12 April	Alexander III	Steamship	John Key	Abden	United Kingdom	For private owner.
12 April	Kirklees	Steamship	Messrs. Bowdler, Chaffer & Co.	Seacombe	United Kingdom	For Kirklees Hall Steam Navigation Company.
12 April	Premier	Merchantman	Messrs. Brown & Co	Dundee	United Kingdom	For T. Nicholl and P. M. Cochrane.
12 April	Sarah Grice	Merchantman	Messrs. Laurence, Hill & Co.	Port Glasgow	United Kingdom	For private owner.
13 April	Charlemagne	Merchantman	Mr. Lawrie	Whiteinch	United Kingdom	For Messrs. Lidgett.
13 April	Konigin Sophia	Steamship	Messrs. Randolph, Elder & Co.	Fairfield	United Kingdom	For Netherlands Inland Steam Navigation Co.
13 April	Thistle	Steamship	Messrs. A. & J. Inglis	Pointhouse	United Kingdom	For Glasgow and Londonderry Steam Packet Co.
13 April	Whiteinch	Paddle steamer	Messrs. T. Wingate & Co	Whiteinch	United Kingdom	For United and Universal Steam Navigation Company (Limited).
15 April	Buffalo	Paddle steamer	Messrs. Caird & Co.	Greenock	United Kingdom	For Messrs. Burns.
18 April	Bellerophon	Battery ship		Chatham Dockyard	United Kingdom	For Royal Navy.
19 April	Hull	Steamship	Hull and Liverpool Iron Shipbuilding Co.	Hull	United Kingdom	For Messrs. Brown, Atkinson & Co.
20 April	Klamath	Casco-class monitor	S. T. Hambleton & Co.	Cincinnati, Ohio	United States	For United States Navy.
21 April	Jane Shearer	Schooner	Messrs. J. & R. Swan	Kelvindock	United Kingdom	For Messrs. Ninian & Thomas Shearer.
24 April	Thebes	Steamship	Messrs. C. & W. Earle	Hull	United Kingdom	For Messrs. Moss & Co.
25 April	The Yorkshire	Steamship	Trent Shipbuilding Co.	Gainsborough	United Kingdom	For private owner.
26 April	Gauloise	Provence-class ironclad	Arsenal de Brest	Brest	France	For French Navy.
26 April	Mahanada	Full-rigged ship		Whitehaven	United Kingdom	For Messrs. T. & J. Brocklebank.
26 April	Nausett	Casco-class monitor	Donald McKay	Boston, Massachusetts	United States	For United States Navy.
27 April	Cromwell	Steamship	London and Glasgow Engineering and Iron Shipbuilding Co.	Govan	United Kingdom	For Iron Screw Collier Co.
27 April	Hibernia	Steamship	Messrs. A. Stephen & Sons	Kelvinhaugh	United Kingdom	For Anchor Line.
27 April	Leila	Yacht	Messrs. Kirkpatrick, M'Intyre & Co.	Port Glasgow	United Kingdom	For John Ferguson.
27 April	Pekina	Clipper	John Smith	Aberdeen	United Kingdom	For Messrs. Devitt & Moore.
27 April	William Taylor	Steamship	Messrs. Kirkpatrick, M'Intyre & Co.	Port Glasgow	United Kingdom	For Messrs. William Taylor & Co.
28 April	British Monarch	East Indiaman	Messrs. J. R. Clover & Co.	Woodside	United Kingdom	For British Shipowners' Association.
29 April	Queen	Steamship	Messrs. Laird Bros.	Birkenhead	United Kingdom	For National Steam Navigation Co.
April	Alexandra	Steamship	Messrs. Kirkpatrick, M'Intyre & Co	Port Glasgow	United Kingdom	For private owner.
April	Undaunted	Paddle steamer	A. Denny	Dumbarton	United Kingdom	For private owner.
2 May	Aerial	Paddle steamer	Messrs. Hedderwick & Co.	Govan	United Kingdom	For private owner.
4 May	Waxsaw	Casco-class monitor	A. & W. Denmead & Son	Baltimore, Maryland	United States	For United States Navy.
8 May	Yazoo	Casco-class monitor	Merrick & Sons	Philadelphia, Pennsylvania	United States	For United States Navy.
9 May	American	Steamship	Messrs. Scott & Co.	Greenock	United Kingdom	For West India and Pacific Steam Shipping Co.
9 May	Griffin	Steam yacht	Messrs. Aitken & Manel	Whiteinch	United Kingdom	For James Baird.
10 May	Lion	Steamship	Humber Ironworks and Shipbuilding Co.	Hull	United Kingdom	For Messrs. Brownlow, Lumsden & Co.
10 May	Minnie	Barquentine	W. Read	Ipswich	United Kingdom	For Thomas Gilpin.
10 May	Navas de Tolosa	Screw frigate	Arsenal de La Carraca	San Fernando	Spain	For Spanish Navy.
11 May	Allemannia	Steamship	Messrs. Day & Co.	Southampton	United Kingdom	For Hamburg-Amerikanische Packetfahrt-Aktien-Gesellschaft.
12 May	Ceylon	Barque	J. M. Reed	Sunderland	United Kingdom	For William Dawson.
13 May	Creusa	Schooner	Messrs. Hansen	Cowes	United Kingdom	For W. J. Rideout.
13 May	Eliza Walker	Steamship	Messrs. Holderness & Chilton	Liverpool	United Kingdom	For W. Walker and others.
13 May	Jacques de Molay	Steamship	Messrs. Holderness & Chilton	Liverpool	United Kingdom	For Mr. Mewburn and others.
13 May	Ottawa	Steamship	Messrs. Laird Bros.	Birkenhead	United Kingdom	For British Colonial Steamship Co.
14 May	Hydrabad	Merchantman	Robert Duncan & Co.	Port Glasgow	United Kingdom	For Bombay Iron Ship Company.
16 May	Eclair	Paddle steamer	Messrs. Kirkpatrick, M'Intyre & Co.	Port Glasgow	United Kingdom	For Dartmouth Steam Packet Co.
16 May	Waverley	Paddle steamer	A. & J. Inglis Ltd.	Glasgow	United Kingdom	For North British Railway.
17 May	Meteor	Camäleon-class gunboat	Königliche Werft	Danzig	Prussia	For Prussian Navy.
18 May	Koka	Casco-class monitor	Wilcox & Whiting	Camden, New Jersey	United States	For United States Navy.
22 May	Daphne	Yacht	Griffith Edwards	Menai Bridge	United Kingdom	For W. Thompson.
23 May	Advance	Merchantman	Messrs. J. & R. Swan	Kelvin Dock	United Kingdom	For Falkirk Iron Company.
23 May	Amazon	Amazon-class sloop		Pembroke Dockyard	United Kingdom	For Royal Navy.
23 May	Swatara	Screw sloop		Philadelphia Navy Yard	United States	For United States Navy.
24 May	Bouvet	Bouvet-class aviso	Arsenal de Rochefort	Rochefort	France	For French Navy.
24 May	Erzherzog Ferdinand Max	Erzherzog Ferdinand Max-class ironclad	Stabilimento Tecnico Triestino	Trieste	Austrian Empire	For Austrian Navy.
25 May	Harvest Maid	Merchantman	Edwards	Caernarfon	United Kingdom	For private owner.
25 May	Cher	Indre-class transport	Arsenal de Cherbourg	Cherbourg	France	For French Navy.
25 May	Llama	Paddle steamer	Messrs. Caird & Co.	Greenock	United Kingdom	For Messrs. J. & G. Burns.
27 May	George Thompson	Clipper	Messrs. Walter Hood & Co.	Aberdeen	United Kingdom	For Alexander Nichol.
27 May	Lord Warden	Lord Clyde-class ironclad	E. J. Reed	Chatham Dockyard	United Kingdom	For Royal Navy.
27 May	Nina	Palos-class tug	Reaney, Son & Archbold	Chester, Pennsylvania	United States	For United States Navy.
27 May	Santiago	Paddle steamer	Messrs. Randolph, Elder & Co.	Fairfield	United Kingdom	For Pacific Steam Navigation Company.
27 May	Sesostris	Cargo ship	Harland & Wolff	Belfast	United Kingdom	For James Moss & Co. May have been named Memphis on launch.
29 May	R. F. Bell	Brig	Rawlinson	Barrow-in-Furness	United Kingdom	For private owner.
29 May	James Sutherland	Steamship	Messrs. Thomas & William Smith	North Shields	United Kingdom	For private owner.
29 May	Japan	Steamship	Messrs. Hedderwick & Co.	Govan	United Kingdom	For private owner.
29 May	Prudhoe	Barque	John T. Alcock	Sunderland	United Kingdom	For John Dryden.
31 May	Admiraal	Steamship	Messrs. A. Hall & Co.	Aberdeen	United Kingdom	For Netherland India Steam Navigation Co. Ltd.
May	Cuban	Brig		St. Martins	(United Kingdom of Great Britain and Ireland) Colony of New Brunswick	For private owner.
May	Egeria	Yacht	Wanhill	Poole	United Kingdom	For J. Mulholland.
May	Navigator	Schooner	John Batchelor, or Batchelor Bros.	Cardiff	United Kingdom	For J. Le Bailly.
May	Shepherdess	Brigantine	William Bonker	Salcombe	United Kingdom	For William Shepherd and others.
1 June	Mukhbir Suroor	Paddle steamer	Messrs. Tod & MacGregor	Partick	United Kingdom	For Isma'il Pasha.
10 June	Epsilon	Barque	Messrs. Cox & Son	Bideford	United Kingdom	For Messrs. Bath.
10 June	Taureau	Ironclad	Arsenal de Toulon	Toulon	France	For French Navy.'
11 June	Bahia	Monitor	Laird Brothers	Birkenhead	United Kingdom	For Imperial Brazilian Navy.
13 June	Darra	East Indiaman	Messrs. Hall	Aberdeen	United Kingdom	For Messrs. Dunbar & Co.
13 June	Minerva	Steamship	Messrs. William Denny & Bros.	Dumbarton	United Kingdom	For Österreichischer Lloyd.
13 June	Phiona	Cutter	Fyfe	Fairlie	United Kingdom	For H. Lafone.
15 June	Charlotte Webb	Pilot boat	Webb & Bell	New York	United States	For Company of New York Pilots.
16 June	Menai	Cutter	Messrs. Ratsey & Sons	Cowes	United Kingdom	For Colonel Loyd.
16 June	Ornate	Merchantman	Vaux	Harwich Dockyard	United Kingdom	For private owner.
20 June	Palm Tree	Full-rigged ship	James Smith	Saint John	(United Kingdom of Great Britain and Ireland) Colony of New Brunswick	For private owner.
21 June	Tamandaré	Gunboat	Arsenal de Marinha da Corte	Rio de Janeiro	Brazil	For Imperial Brazilian Navy.
23 June	Subina	Steamship	Messrs. C. Palmer & Co.	Howdon	United Kingdom	For private owner.
23 June	Unnamed	Yacht	Hugh Owen	Menai Bridge	United Kingdom	For Hanson Berney.
24 June	Don Baltazar	Merchantman	Messrs. R. & J. Evans & Co.	Liverpool	United Kingdom	For Messts. T. H. Ismay & Co.
24 June	Duke of Sutherland	Clipper	John Smith	Aberdeen	United Kingdom	For Messrs. Louttit.
24 June	England	Steamship	Messrs. Palmer Bros.	Jarrow	United Kingdom	For National Steam Navigation Co.
24 June	Habsburg	Erzherzog Ferdinand Max-class ironclad	Stabilimento Tecnico Triestino	Trieste	Austrian Empire	For Austrian Navy.
24 June	Java	Ocean liner	Messrs. J. & G. Thomson	Govan	United Kingdom	For Cunard Line.
24 June	Unnamed	Steamship	Messrs. C. Palmer & Co.	Howdon	United Kingdom	For private owner.
24 June	Unnamed	Steamship	Messrs. Palmer Bros.	Jarros	United Kingdom	For private owner.
26 June	Orhaniye	Osmaniye-class ironclad	Robert Napier and Sons	Govan	United Kingdom	For Ottoman Navy.
27 June	Anazi	Barque	Robert Turnbull	Portsmouth	United Kingdom	For private owner.
27 June	California	Steamship	Messrs. Scott & Co.	Greenock	United Kingdom	For West India Pacific Steam Shipping Co.
27 June	Fusi Yama	composite barque	Alexander Stephen & Sons	Kelvinhaugh	United Kingdom	For Killick Martin & Company.
June	Carmarthenshire	Full-rigged ship	Allen & Varlow	Pembroke Dock	United Kingdom	For David J. Jenkins.
June	Hermann	Steamship	Messrs. Caird & Co.	Greenock	United Kingdom	For Norddeutscher Lloyd.
June	James Shepherd	Full-rigged ship	W. Briggs	Sunderland	United Kingdom	For James Shepherd & Co.
June	Karanja	Paddle steamer	Messrs. Henderson, Coulborn & Co.	Renfrew	United Kingdom	For Bombay Coast & River Steam Navigation Co.
June	Minerva	Steamship	Messrs. W. Denny & Bros	Dumbarton	United Kingdom	For Österreichischer Lloyd.
June	Modoc	Casco-class monitor	J. S. Underhill	Greenpoint, New York	United States	For United States Navy.
June	Niewah	Barque	Messrs. John Reid & Co.	Port Glasgow	United Kingdom	For Messrs. Smith, Fleming & Co.
June	Yatala	Full-rigged ship	Thomas Bilbe	Rotherhithe	United Kingdom	For Anderson, Thomson & Co.
6 July	Albion	Steamship	Messrs. Tod & MacGregor	Partick	United Kingdom	For Glasgow and Stranraer Steam Company.
7 July	Court Hey	Tug	Archibald Denny	Dumbarton	United Kingdom	For Messrs. Gladstone, Wylie & Co.
8 July	Barone Risacoli	Steamship	J. G. Lawrie	Glasgow	United Kingdom	For Messrs. C. A. Pellas & Co.
8 July	Duchess	Steamship	Lune Ship Building Co.	Lancaster	United Kingdom	For private owner.
8 July	Francoli	Steamship	James Laing	Sunderland	United Kingdom	For Tintoré.
8 July	Madawaska	Wampanoag-class frigate		New York Navy Yard	United States	For United States Navy.
8 July	Sarah Garcia	Steamship	Messrs. Alexander Stephen & Sons	Kelvinhaugh	United Kingdom	For Messrs. Simon, Garcia & Jacobs.
10 July	Adelaide	Barque		Quebec	(United Kingdom of Great Britain and Ireland) Province of Canada	For private owner.
10 July	Constance	Brigatine	Cobbold	Ipswich	United Kingdom	For private owner.
10 July	The Elizabeth and Ann	Schooner	John Gibson	Fleetwood	United Kingdom	For private owner.
11 July	City of Benares	Merchantman	Messrs. Barclay, Curle & Co.	Stobcross	United Kingdom	For Messrs. George Smith & Son.
11 July	Count Van der Bosh	Steamship	Messrs. W. Simons & Co.	Renfrew	United Kingdom	For Netherlands Steam Navigation Co.
14 July	Shiloh	Casco-class monitor	Charles W. McCordat	St. Louis, Missouri	United States	For United States Navy.
22 July	Ashuelot	Gunboat	Donald McKay	East Boston, Massachusetts	United States	For United States Navy.
22 July	Dunderberg	Casemate ironclad	William Henry Webb	New York City	United States	For United States Navy.
22 July	Preston Belle	Steamship	Preston Iron Ship Building Co.	Preston	United Kingdom	For Ribble Navigation Co.
22 July	St Vincent	Clipper	Pile, Hay & Co.	Sunderland	United Kingdom	For Devitt and Moore.
25 July	Coimbatore	Merchantman	Messrs. Barclay, Curle & Co.	Whiteinch	United Kingdom	For Messrs. Eyre, Evans & Co.
25 July	Taitsing	Clipper	Charles Connell & Co.	Glasgow	United Kingdom	For Findlay & Longmuir.
25 July	Wassuc	Casco-class monitor	George W. Lawrence & Co	Portland, Maine	United States	For United States Navy.
26 July	Fuadie	Steamship	Tyne Iron Ship Building Co.	Newcastle upon Tyne	United Kingdom	For Sr. T. Lemmi.
26 July	Imogene	Steamship	John White	Cowes	United Kingdom	For private owner.
26 July	Titania	Yacht	Samuel White	Cowes	United Kingdom	For Earl of Rosse.
27 July	Swansea	Steamship	Bowdler, Chaffer & Co.	Seacombe	United Kingdom	For John Bacon.
July	Amberwitch	Barque	David Banks & Co.	Plymouth	United Kingdom	For private owner.
July	Ancilla	Full-rigged ship	Messrs. P. Bruelle & Sons	Quebec	(United Kingdom of Great Britain and Ireland) Province of Canada	For private owner.
July	Annie E. Boyd	Barque		Weldford	(United Kingdom of Great Britain and Ireland) Colony of New Brunswick	For private owner.
July	Atma	Barque	G. Peverall	Sunderland	United Kingdom	For W. Atkinson.
July	Count Von der Bosh	Steamship	Messrs. W. Symons & Co.	Renfrew	United Kingdom	For Netherlands Steam Navigation Company.
July	Glentilt	Full-rigged ship	Messrs. Valin & Dugal	Quebec	(United Kingdom of Great Britain and Ireland) Province of Canada	For private owner.
July	Martaban	Steamship	Messrs. Denny & Bros	Dumbarton	United Kingdom	For Irrawaddy and Burmese Steam Navigation Co.
July	Sophie	Barque		Quebec	(United Kingdom of Great Britain and Ireland) Province of Canada	For private owner.
3 August	Drache	Camäleon-class gunboat	Königliche Werft	Danzig	Prussia	For Prussian Navy.
3 August	The Sisters	Schooner	David Burns	Aberdeen	United Kingdom	For Mr. M'Lachlan.
7 August	Calypso	Steamship	Messrs. C. & W. Earle	Hull	United Kingdom	For Messrs. T. Wilson, Sons & Co.
7 August	Mahroussé	Royal yacht	Messrs. Samuda Bros.	Millwall	United Kingdom	For Isma'il Pasha.
8 August	Independencia	Ironclad	Messrs. Samuda Bros.	Millwall	United Kingdom	For Peruvian Navy.
8 August	St. Malo	Steamship	Messrs. Aitken & Mansel	Whiteinch	United Kingdom	For London and South Western Railway.
8 August	Strathnaver	Clipper	William Duthie Jr.	Aberdeen	United Kingdom	For Henry Adamson.
8 August	Zeta	Steamship	Messrs. Alexander Stephen & Sons	Kelvinhaugh	United Kingdom	For Messrs Henry Bath & Son.
9 August	Delaware	Steamship	Isle of Man Shipbuilding Co. (Limited)	North Ramsey	Isle of Man	For C. E. Dixon.
9 August	Isabella	Schooner	John Watson	Banff	United Kingdom	For Mr. Calder.
10 August	Belle of Southesk	Barque	Messrs. Joseph Birnie & Co.	Montrose	United Kingdom	For Messrs. M'Taggart, Sidman & Co.
10 August	Carmelita	Merchantman	Messrs. Alexander Stephen & Sons	Kelvinhaugh	United Kingdom	For Lean, Jose & Co.
10 August	Earl Canning	Steamship	Messrs. R. Duncan & Co.	Port Glasgow	United Kingdom	For Bombay Coast and River Company.
12 August	Conte Menebrea	Steamship	J. G. Laurie	Whiteinch	United Kingdom	For Messrs. C. A. Pellas & Co.
15 August	Petropavlovsk	Armored frigate or broadside ironclad	New Admiralty Shipyard	Saint Petersburg	Russia	For Imperial Russian Navy.
17 August	Liffey Maid	Schooner	Hugh Kelly	Dublin	United Kingdom	For James Fisher.
21 August	Pilot	Schooner	Harland & Wolff	Belfast	United Kingdom	For Gustav Wilhelm Wolff.
23 August	Wisconsin	Steamship	Messrs. William Denny & Bros	Dumbarton	United Kingdom	For private owner.
25 August	Empreza	Barque	Messrs. Hedderwick & Co.	Govan	United Kingdom	For Messrs. R. Singlehurst & Co.
25 August	Fannie Patton	Sternwheeler	John T. Thomas	Canemah, Oregon	United States	For People's Transportation Company.
26 August	Kreml	Pervenets-class ironclad	Semiannikov & Poletika	Saint Petersburg	Russia	For Imperial Russian Navy.
August	Artistic	Brig	W. T. Ellis	Prince Edward Island	(United Kingdom of Great Britain and Ireland) Colony of Prince Edward Island	For private owner.
August	Lady Louisa	Barque	Robert Thompson Jr.	Sunderland	United Kingdom	For Wilson & Co.
August	Moderation	Full-rigged ship		Quebec	(United Kingdom of Great Britain and Ireland) Province of Canada	For private owner.
August	Ville de Hoe	Steamship			China	For private owner.
August	Zeta	Steamship	Messrs. A. Stephen & Sons	Kelvinhaugh	United Kingdom	For private owner.
5 September	Conqueror	Paddle steamer	Messrs. W. Simons & Co.	Renfrew	United Kingdom	For Clyde Shipping Company.
6 September	Belliqueuse	Ironclad corvette	Arsenal de Toulon	Toulon	France	For French Navy.'
6 September	Francis Henry	Schooner	David Williams	Alltfawr	United Kingdom	For private owner.
6 September	Guyenne	Provence-class ironclad	Arsenal de Rochefort	Rochefort	France	For French Navy.'
7 September	Chilian	Steamship	M. Pearse & Co.	Stockton-on-Tees	United Kingdom	For British Steam Navigation Co.
7 September	Erl King	Steamship	A. & J. Inglis	Pointhouse	United Kingdom	For Robertson & Co.
7 September	Fairy Queen	Paddle steamer	Harland & Wolff	Belfast	United Kingdom	For the Rock Ferry Co.
7 September	Goshawk	Cowes	Hansen	East Cowes	United Kingdom	For R. Witt.
7 September	Riversdale	East Indiaman	Messrs. Andrews & Co.	Seacombe	United Kingdom	For Messrs. L. H. Macintye & Co.
8 September	Albert	Steamship	Messrs. J. & R. Swan	Kelvin Dock	United Kingdom	For private owner.
8 September	Gypsy Queen	Paddle steamer	Harland & Wolff	Belfast	United Kingdom	For the Rock Ferry Co.
9 September	Dewdrop	Fishing trawler	John Barter	Brixham	United Kingdom	For John Dugdall and others.
9 September	Guerriere	Java-class sloop-of-war		Boston Navy Yard	United States	For United States Navy.
9 September	Margaret Longton	Barque	Messrs. Bowdler, Chaffer & Co.	Seacombe	United Kingdom	For Messrs. J. Longton Jr., & Co.
9 September	Mariei	Steamship	Messrs. T. Wingate & Co.	Whiteinch	United Kingdom	For Messrs. Cruickshank & Co.
9 September	Milo	Steamship	London and Glasgow Shipbuilding and Engineering Company (limited)	Glasgow	United Kingdom	For Messrs. T. Wilson & Sons.
9 September	Persian Empire	Merchantman	Messrs. Pile, Spence & Co. (limited)	West Hartlepool	United Kingdom	For Messrs. George Duncan & Co.
13 September	Fairy Queen	Schooner		Preton	United Kingdom	For G. Lawson.
13 September	The Ribbleton	Barque	Mackern	Preston, Lancashire	United Kingdom	For private owner.
17 September	Oneida	Full-rigged ship	J. R. Gingras	Quebec	(United Kingdom of Great Britain and Ireland) Province of Canada	For private owner.
17 September	Saint Lawrence	Steamship	Messrs. Oswald & Co.	Pallion	United Kingdom	For British Colonial Steam Shipping Co.
17 September	Uitenhage	Steamship	James Laing	Sunderland	United Kingdom	For Diamond Screw Steam Shipping Co.
19 September	Boyne	Barque	Harland & Wolff	Belfast	United Kingdom	For W. H. Tindall.
20 September	Ilva	Barque	W. H. Pearson Jr.	Pallion	United Kingdom	For Fairley Bros.
23 September	Alfredo	Barque	Messrs. Bowdler, Chaffer & Co.	Seacombe	United Kingdom	For Messrs. Hawkes, Albizuri & Co.
23 September	Eta	Barque	Messrs. Hill & Sons	Bristol	United Kingdom	For Messrs. Henry Bath & Sons.
27 September	Lizzie	Brig	Charles Green	Prince Edward Island	(United Kingdom of Great Britain and Ireland) Colony of Prince Edward Island	For private owner.
27 September	Oneglia	Steamship	Messrs. Macnab & Co.	Greenock	United Kingdom	For San Remo Steam Navigation Co.
September	Alert	Paddle steamer		Birkenhead	United Kingdom	For Liverpool Dock Board.
September	Nile	Steamship	T. R. Oswald	Sunderland	United Kingdom	For John A. Dunkerley & Co.
5 September	Palestro	Corvette	Forges et Chantiers de la Méditerranée	La Seyne	France	For Regia Marina.
2 October	Sundy	Steamship	Messrs. W. Simons & Co.	Renfrew	United Kingdom	For Netherland India Steam Navigation Co.
4 October	Huntleys	Brig	James Robinson	Pallion	United Kingdom	For Messrs. John Turner & Co.
5 October	Faid Zafar	Paddle steamer	Messrs. Tod & MacGregor	Glasgow	United Kingdom	For Isma'il Pasha.
5 October	John Williams	Barque	Messrs. Hall	Aberdeen	United Kingdom	For London Missionary Society.
5 October	King of the Greeks	Steamship	Messrs. Richardson, Duck & Co., Ltd	Hartlepool	United Kingdom	For private owner.
5 October	Kinsale	Steamship	Messrs. Henderson, Coulborn & Co.	Renfrew	United Kingdom	For Glasgow Screw Steamship Co.
5 October	Neshaminy	Frigate		Philadelphia Navy Yard	United States	For United States Navy.
6 October	Avon	Steamship	Messrs. Barclay, Curle & Co.	Stobcross	United Kingdom	For Carron Company.
6 October	Capri	Steamship	Messrs. William Denny & Bros.	Dumbarton	United Kingdom	For Österreichischer Lloyd.
6 October	Duke of Argyll	East Indiaman	Messrs. Denny & Rankin	Greenock	United Kingdom	For Messrs. Montgomerie & Greenhorne.
6 October	Isabella Hall	Merchantman	Messrs. Scott & Macgill	Bowlingv	United Kingdom	For private owner.
7 October	Cormorant	Merchantman	Messrs. Thomas Vernon & Sons	Liverpool	United Kingdom	For Messrs. W. J. Myers, Son, & Co.
7 October	Enterprise	Schooner	Messrs. J. & P Winlo	Stanhope Drops	United Kingdom	For Messrs. Court.
7 October	European	Steamship	Messrs, Jones, Quiggin & Co.	Liverpool	United Kingdom	For West India and Pacific Steamship Co. Ltd.
7 October	Ganges	Merchantman	Messrs. G. R. Clover & Co.	Woodside	United Kingdom	For Messrs. F. A. Clint & Co.
7 October	Huáscar	Ironclad	Laird Bros.	Birkenhead	United Kingdom	For Peruvian Navy.
7 October	Iron Queen	Barque	Thomas Spittle	Newport	United Kingdom	For private owner.
7 October	Lady Derby	Steamship	Messrs. Maudslay, Sons & Field	East Greenwich	United Kingdom	For General Iron Screw Collier Co.
7 October	The Pursuit	Smack	Robinson	Kingston upon Hull	United Kingdom	For W. Markcrow.
9 October	Maravilla	Merchantman	Preston Iron Ship Building Co.	Preston, Lancashire	United Kingdom	For Messrs. G. H. Fletcher & Co.
10 October	Celt	Steamship	Millwall Iron Works, Shipbuilding, and Graving Docks Company (Limited)	Millwall	United Kingdom	For Union Steam Shipping Co.
10 October	Honfleur	Steamship	Millwall Iron Works, Shipbuilding, and Graving Docks Company (Limited)	Millwall	United Kingdom	For London, Brighton and South Coast Railway.
11 October	A. T. Stewart	Pilot boat	Edward F. Williams	Greenpoint, New York	United States	For New York Pilots' Association.
16 October	Taranaki	Steamship	Messrs. Blackwood & Gordon	Port Glasgow	United Kingdom	For New Zealand Steam Navigation Co.
19 October	Malta	Steamship	Messrs. J. & G. Thompson	Govan	United Kingdom	For Messrs. Burns & MacIver.
20 October	Mandingo	Steamship	Messrs. Randolph, Elder & Co.	Govan	United Kingdom	For African Steamship Co.
21 October	Pietre Landberg	Steamship	Mackern	Preston, Lancashire	United Kingdom	For Messrs. Fawcett, Preston & Co.
23 October	Nile	Steamship	Messrs. C. & W. Earle	Hull	United Kingdom	For Messrs. Moss & Co.
October	City of Aberdeen	Steamship	Messrs. R. Duncan & Co.	Port Glasgow	United Kingdom	For Aberdeen Steam Navigation Company.
October	Sandy	Steamship	Messrs. W. Simons & Co.	Renfrew	United Kingdom	For Netherlands India Steam Navigation Co.
October	Venezia	Steamship	Messrs. A. Stephen & Sons	Kelvinhaugh	United Kingdom	For Messrs. Handyside & Henderson.
3 November	Kaiyō Maru	Frigate	Cornelis Gips & Zonen	Dordrecht	Netherlands	For Imperial Japanese Navy.
4 November	Barroso	Ironclad gunboat	Arsenal de Marinha da Côrte	Rio de Janeiro	Brazil	For Imperial Brazilian Navy.
4 November	Mayflower	Merchantman	Foster	Emsworth	United Kingdom	For Mr. Foster.
4 November	Pereire	Steamship	Messrs. Robert Napier & Sons	Govan	United Kingdom	For Compagnie Générale Transatlantique.
4 November	Vitoria	Armored frigate	Thames Ironworks	Millwall	United Kingdom	For Spanish Navy.
6 November	Anne Laity Banfield	East Indiaman	Messrs. Robert Duncan & Co.	Port Glasgow	United Kingdom	For Messrs. Fraser Banfield & Sons.
7 November	Agnes Jack	Collier	Messrs. Bowdler, Chaffer & Co.	Seacombe	United Kingdom	For Messrs. John Bacon & Co.
7 November	County of Argyll	East Indiaman	Messrs. Charles Connell & Co.	Overnewton	United Kingdom	For Messrs. R. & J. Craig.
9 November	Duddon	Paddle tug	Harland & Wolff	Belfast	United Kingdom	For Hodbarrow Mining Co.
9 November	Jasper	Steamship	Messrs. J. & R. Swan	Kelvindock	United Kingdom	For William Robertson.
9 November	Victory	Schooner	Messrs. J. & R. Swan	Kelvindock	United Kingdom	For Mr. Cooper and others.
11 November	Ada	Clipper	Messrs. Hall	Aberdeen	United Kingdom	For private owner.
15 November	Guarani	Cargo ship	Harland & Wolff	Belfast	United Kingdom	For J. Dalglish.
18 November	Endymion	Ister-class frigate		Deptford Dockyard	United Kingdom	For Royal Navy.
18 November	Resaca	Steamship		Portsmouth Navy Yard	United States	For United States Navy.
18 November	River Eden	Steamship	Messrs. Hedderwick & Co.	Govan	United Kingdom	For Messrs. Hargrove, Ferguson & Co.
18 November	Sanda	Steamship	Messrs. Henderson, Coulborn & Co.	Renfrew	United Kingdom	For Clyde Shipping Co.
18 November	Vixen	Vixen-class gunboat	Charles Lungley	Deptford	United Kingdom	For Royal Navy.
23 November	Leeds	Steamship	Messrs. A. & J. Inglis	Glasgow	United Kingdom	For Manchester, Sheffield and Lincolnshire Railway.
23 November	Douglas	Steamship	Messrs. Hall, Russell & Co.	Aberdeen	United Kingdom	For Douglas Laprick and others.
25 November	Agamemnon	Steamship	Messrs. Scott & Co.	Greenock	United Kingdom	For Ocean Steam Ship Co.
25 November	Alexandra	Paddle steamer	Messrs. Hedderwick & Co.	Govan	United Kingdom	For Saloon Steampacket Co., London (Limited).
25 November	Lincoln	Steamship	Humber Iron Works and Shipbuilding Company (Limited)	Hull	United Kingdom	For Manchester, Sheffield and Lincolnshire Railway.
30 November	Malaga	Steamship	Messrs. J. & R. Swan	Maryhill	United Kingdom	For Messrs. Morris & Munro.
30 November	Rohilla	Merchantman	Messrs. Alexander Stephen & Sons	Kelvinhaugh	United Kingdom	For Messrs. Finlay, Campbell & Co.
November	A. Lopez	Steamship	Messrs. W. Denny & Bros.	Dumbarton	United Kingdom	For Messrs. A. Lopez & Co.
November	Annie Sharp	Merchantman	Harland & Wolff	Belfast	United Kingdom	For R. G. Sharp.
November	Forty-Nine	Steamboat		Little Dalles, Oregon	United States	For private owner.
November	Maranee	Schooner	Mr. Byrnes	Gloucester	United Kingdom	For William Morris.
November	Vestal	Amazon-class sloop		Pembroke	United Kingdom	For Royal Navy.
November	William Penn	Steamship	John Horn	Waterford	United Kingdom	For Messrs. Malcolmson Bros.
1 December	Alsace	Steamship	Forges et Chantiers de la Méditerranée	La Seyne	France	For Soc. Générale de Transports Maritimes à Vapeur
1 December	Thordön	John Ericsson-class monitor	Motala Verkstad	Norrköping	Sweden	For Royal Swedish Navy.
5 December	Bravo	Steamship	London and Glasgow Engineering and Iron Shipbuilding Company (Limited)	Glasgow	United Kingdom	For Messrs. Thomas Wilson, Sons, & Co.
5 December	John R. Worcester	Clipper	Marine Investment Company (Limited)	Ladyburgh	United Kingdom	For Messrs. Wilson, Worcester & Co, or Marine Investment Co.
5 December	Lady Wodehouse	Steamship	Messrs. Walpole, Webb & Bewley	Dublin	United Kingdom	For British and Irish Steam Company.
6 December	City of Paris	Steamship	Messrs. Tod & MacGregor	Partick	United Kingdom	For Inman Line.
6 December	Cyclone	Paddle steamer	Messrs. W. Simons & Co.	Renfrew	United Kingdom	For private owner.
12 December	Kappa	Merchantman	Messrs. A. Stephen & Sons	Kelvinhaugh	United Kingdom	For Messrs. Henry Bath & Son.
16 December	Syren	Ferryboat	J. H. Mackern	Preston	United Kingdom	For New Ferry Company.
18 December	Roma	Roma-class ironclad	Cantiere della Foce	Genoa	Italy	For Regia Marina.
19 December	Hiogo	Steamship	James Laing	Sunderland	United Kingdom	For James Laing.
20 December	Hugh Fortescue	Chinaman	Messrs. Holman	Topsham	United Kingdom	For private owner.
21 December	Alexandra No.3	Steamship	Messrs. Hedderwick & Co.	Govan	United Kingdom	For Saloon Steam Packet Co.
21 December	Eliza and Alice	Schooner	Edward Teal	Leeds	United Kingdom	For private owner.
21 December	Lima Barros	Ironclad	Laird Bros.	Birkenhead	United Kingdom	For Imperial Brazilian Navy.
21 December	Sandringham	Sloop	Edward Teal	Leeds	United Kingdom	For private owner.
21 December	Umpqua	Casco-class monitor	Snowden & Mason	Brownsville, Pennsylvania	United States	For United States Navy.
21 December	Viper	Viper-class gunboat	J. & W. Dudgeon	Cubitt Town	United Kingdom	For Royal Navy.
22 December	Palmyra	Steamship	Messrs. Caird & Co.	Greenock	United Kingdom	For Messrs. Burns & Co.
23 December	Callirrhoe	East Indiaman	Humber Iron Works and Shipbuilding Company (Limited)	Hull	United Kingdom	For Edward Bates.
December	Bradford	Steamship	Messrs. A. & J. Inglis	Glasgow	United Kingdom	For Manchester, Sheffield and Lincolnshire Railway.
December	Concord	Steamship	Llanelly Iron Co.	Llanelly	United Kingdom	For private owner.
December	Fairy Vision	Steamship	Lawrie	Whiteinch	United Kingdom	For Messrs. G. Reynolds & Co.
December	Great Northern	Paddle steamer	J. Key	Kinghorn	United Kingdom	For Liverpool and Dublin Steam Navigation Company (limited).
December	Lagos	Steamship	Messrs. Randolph, Elder & Co	Glasgow	United Kingdom	For African Steamship Co.
December	Pride of the Dee	Schooner	Mr. Bishton	Chester	United Kingdom	For Craven & Co.
December	Ville de Paris	Steamship	Messrs. R. Napier & Sons	Govan	United Kingdom	For Compagnie Générale Transatlantique.
Spring	Eldorado	Full-rigged ship		Kennebunk, Maine	United States	For private owner.
Summer	Fleetwing	Full-rigged ship	Messrs. Charland & Marquis	Quebec	(United Kingdom of Great Britain and Ireland) Province of Canada	For private owner.
Summer	Nerbudda	Steamship	Messrs. T. Vernon & Sons	Liverpool	United Kingdom	For Bombay and Bengal Steam Shipping Co.
Unknown date	Achilles	Steamship	James Laing	Sunderland	United Kingdom	For E. T. Gourley & Co.
Unknown date	Adelphoi	Barquentine	Thomas Robson	Sunderland	United Kingdom	For Blain & Co.
Unknown date	Admiral	Boat	Thomas Morland	Hobart	(United Kingdom of Great Britain and Ireland) Tasmania	For Charles Dillon.
Unknown date	Albany	Merchantman	James Laing	Sunderland	United Kingdom	For Diamond Steam Navigation Co.
Unknown date	Albatross	Merchantman	B. Hodgson	Sunderland	United Kingdom	For Humble & Co.
Unknown date	Aldersons	Merchantman	W. Chilton	Sunderland	United Kingdom	For Mr. Philliskirk.
Unknown date	Alexandra	Merchantman	G. Gardner	Sunderland	United Kingdom	For Aberdeen Shipping Co.
Unknown date	Alice Latham	Schooner	William Ashburner	Barrow-in-Furness	United Kingdom	For Henry Bond.
Unknown date	Alliance	Merchantman	B. Hodgson	Sunderland	United Kingdom	For Mills & Co.
Unknown date	Amy Serena	Snow	William Pickersgill	Sunderland	United Kingdom	For J. D. Pain.
Unknown date	Andrew Johnson	Chase-class cutter	J. & R. Gray	Buffalo, New York	United States	For United States Revenue Cutter Service.
Unknown date	Annie Ellison	Merchantman	Gray & Young	Sunderland	United Kingdom	For W. D. C. Balls.
Unknown date	Annie Gray	Full-rigged ship	Mr. Gass		(United Kingdom of Great Britain and Ireland) Colony of New Brunswick	For private owner.
Unknown date	Ann Millicent	Merchantman	Humber Iron Works and Shipbuilding Company (Limited)	Hull	United Kingdom	For private owner.
Unknown date	Apollo	steamship	Messrs. C. & W. Earle	Kingston upon Hull	United Kingdom	For private owner.
Unknown date	Arabian	Merchantman	George Barker	Sunderland	United Kingdom	For Dove & Co.
Unknown date	Archos	Barque	W. Adamson	Sunderland	United Kingdom	For Mr. Adamson.
Unknown date	Arcturus	Merchantman	G. Gardner	Sunderland	United Kingdom	For S. W. Kelso.
Unknown date	Ariel	Clipper	Robert Steele & Co.	Greenock	United Kingdom	For Shaw, Lowther & Maxton.
Unknown date	Ariel	Steamship	Humber Iron Works and Shipbuilding Company (Limited)	Kingston upon Hull	United Kingdom	For private owner.
Unknown date	Ashford	Steamship	James Laing	Sunderland	United Kingdom	For Charles Morgan Norwoos.
Unknown date	Avalon	Paddle steamer	Earle's Shipbuilding and Engineering Company	Hull	United Kingdom	For Great Eastern Railway.
Unknown date	Ayton	Merchantman	James Hardie	Sunderland	United Kingdom	For J. & J. Wait.
Unknown date	Balgowan	Merchantman	Robert Thompson & Sons	Sunderland	United Kingdom	For Reed & Co.
Unknown date	Belmont	Merchantman	James Laing	Sunderland	United Kingdom	For Bell & Co.
Unknown date	Blanche	Merchantman	William Doxford	Sunderland	United Kingdom	For Thompson & Co.
Unknown date	Blanche	Schooner	Mr. Beeching	Wells-next-the-Sea	United Kingdom	For C. W. Nevill.
Unknown date	Cambridgeshire	Steamship	James Laing	Sunderland	United Kingdom	For R. Young.
Unknown date	Cabral	Cabral-class Ironclad	J. and G. Rennie	Greenwich	United Kingdom	For Imperial Brazilian Navy.
Unknown date	Campeador	Steamship	Bowdler, Chaffer & Co.	Seacombe	United Kingdom	For José Amman.
Unknown date	Castle Eden	Merchantman	W. Naizby	Sunderland	United Kingdom	For J. Dobbing.
Unknown date	Catherine	Merchantman	A. Simey	Sunderland	United Kingdom	For J. Chisholm.
Unknown date	Catherine & Mary	Merchantman	Gray & Young	Sunderland	United Kingdom	For R. Mushens.
Unknown date	Cedric	Merchantman	Sykes & Co	Sunderland	United Kingdom	For W. Abbey.
Unknown date	Charkieh	Steamship	Thames Ironworks and Shipbuilding Company	Blackwall	United Kingdom	For the Azizieh Steam Navigation Company.
Unknown date	Charles George	Merchantman	Liddle & Sutcliffe	Sunderland	United Kingdom	For Curd & Co.
Unknown date	Chimborazo	Brig	J. & E. Lumsden	Sunderland	United Kingdom	For John Fenwick.
Unknown date	Chipchase	Barque	Tully	Hylton	United Kingdom	For E. H. Watts.
Unknown date	City of Durham	Steamship	James Laing	Sunderland	United Kingdom	For Inman Line.
Unknown date	Cleopatra	Steamship	W. Pile	Sunderland	United Kingdom	For Pile & Co.
Unknown date	Colombo	Cabral-class ironclad	Messrs. J. & G. Rennie	Greenwich	United Kingdom	For Imperial Brazilian Navy.
Unknown date	Como	Merchantman	George Haswell	Sunderland	United Kingdom	For Gray Bros.
Unknown date	Confidence	Merchantman	J. & E. Lumsden	Sunderland	United Kingdom	For S. W. Rackley and associates.
Unknown date	Congou	Barque	James Robinson	Sunderland	United Kingdom	For W. Eggleston.
Unknown date	Cora Linn	Yacht	W. Pile	Sunderland	United Kingdom	For John Hay.
Unknown date	Cotopaxi	Merchantman	W. Pile	Sunderland	United Kingdom	For J. Hay.
Unknown date	Cubana	Barque	James Hardie	Southwick	United Kingdom	For Ord & Co.
Unknown date	Curlew	Schooner			United States	For private owner.
Unknown date	Daring	Merchantman	J. Barkes	Sunderland	United Kingdom	For Vallance & Co.
Unknown date	Deerfoot	Barque	G. Gardner	Sunderland	United Kingdom	For J. R. Kelso.
Unknown date	Derwent	Steamship		Goole	United Kingdom	For private owner.
Unknown date	Deucalion	Barque	Robert Thompson	Sunderland	United Kingdom	For Smith & Co.
Unknown date	Dipton	Merchantman	Richard Thompson	Sunderland	United Kingdom	For Golightly & Co.
Unknown date	Dr. Mungo	Merchantman	Humber Iron Works and Shipbuilding Company (Limited)	Hull	United Kingdom	For private owner.
Unknown date	Duchess	Merchantman	W. Barklay	Sunderland	United Kingdom	For Mr. Davison.
Unknown date	Dunholme	Merchantman	J. Crown	Sunderland	United Kingdom	For Mr. Nicholson.
Unknown date	Eagle	Merchantman	D. A. Douglas	Sunderland	United Kingdom	For Mr. Mawer.
Unknown date	Echo	Sternwheeler		Canemah, Oregon	United States	For Willamette Steam Navigation Company.
Unknown date	Elizabeth & Catherine	Barque	Robert Thompson & Sons	Sunderland	United Kingdom	For private owner.
Unknown date	Ellen Browse	Merchantman	W. Naizby	Sunderland	United Kingdom	For H. Browse.
Unknown date	Ellen Holt	Merchantman	W. Richardson	Sunderland	United Kingdom	For private owner.
Unknown date	El Mahrousa	Royal yacht	Samuda Brothers	Cubitt Town	United Kingdom	For Isma'il Pasha.
Unknown date	Emily	Merchantman	G. Bartram	Sunderland	United Kingdom	For W. Irvin.
Unknown date	Emily & Eliza	Merchantman	D. A. Douglad	Sunderland	United Kingdom	For Sims & Co.
Unknown date	Emma	Brig	J. Briggs	Sunderland	United Kingdom	For Paddon & Co.
Unknown date	Empress	Barque	James Crown	Southwick	United Kingdom	For C. Hodgson.
Unknown date	Ernestine	steamship	Messrs. C. & W. Earle	Kingston upon Hull	United Kingdom	For private owner.
Unknown date	Erycina	Barque	William Nicholson & Sons	Sunderland	United Kingdom	For Nicholson & Sons.
Unknown date	Evening Star	Snow	J. & H. Gibbon	Sunderland	United Kingdom	For Donaldson & Co.
Unknown date	Fatfield	Merchantman	T. R. Oswald	Sunderland	United Kingdom	For Fenwick & Co.
Unknown date	Felis Bella	Merchantman	Reay & Naisby	Sunderland	United Kingdom	For D. C. Scott.
Unknown date	Fiano	Yacht	Fyfe	Fairlie	United Kingdom	For H. Lafone.
Unknown date	Five Sisters	Merchantman	S. Metcalf	Sunderland	United Kingdom	For Mr. McTaggart.
Unknown date	Fleetwing	Schooner	Joseph D. Van Deusen	Williamsburgh, New York	United States	For George Archer Osgood.
Unknown date	Fleur de Lis	Pilot Boat	J. B. & J. D. Van Deusen	East River, New York	United States	For John S. Dickerson.
Unknown date	Fruiterer	Merchantman	J. Robinson	Sunderland	United Kingdom	For Brown & Co.
Unknown date	General Nott	Merchantman	J. Lister	Sunderland	United Kingdom	For Morris & Co.
Unknown date	George & John Yourdi	Merchantman	Rawson & Watson	Sunderland	United Kingdom	For N. Yourdi.
Unknown date	George Bartram	Merchantman	G. Bartram	Sunderland	United Kingdom	For G. Bartram.
Unknown date	George Mills	Barque	G. & J. Mills	Sunderland	United Kingdom	For G. Mills.
Unknown date	Georges & Rosine	Merchantman	Reay & Naisby	Sunderland	United Kingdom	For private owner.
Unknown date	Gitanilla	Barque	Robert Thompson & Sons	Sunderland	United Kingdom	For T. B. & R. Ord.
Unknown date	Glencairn	Merchantman	Rawson & Watson	Sunderland	United Kingdom	For Shotten & Co.
Unknown date	Glendevon	Barque	William Doxford	Sunderland	United Kingdom	For George Henry Longridge.
Unknown date	Glenroy	Merchantman	G. Short	Sunderland	United Kingdom	For private owner.
Unknown date	Golden Plover	Snow	Gibbon & Nichol	Sunderland	United Kingdom	For Morgan & Co.
Unknown date	Grasmere	Full-rigged ship	G. Gardner	Sunderland	United Kingdom	For Devitt & Co.
Unknown date	Green Olive	Merchantman	Gray & Young	Sunderland	United Kingdom	For Mr. Richardson.
Unknown date	Halicore	Merchantman	D. A. Douglas	Sunderland	United Kingdom	For Mr. Milburn.
Unknown date	Harriet	Fishing vessel	Charles W. Aubin	Jersey	(United Kingdom of Great Britain and Ireland) Jersey	For Charles Auger.
Unknown date	Hartlepool	Merchantman	James Laing	Sunderland	United Kingdom	For John Forster.
Unknown date	Harvest Queen	Barque	W. H. Pearson	Sunderland	United Kingdom	For J & R. Hopper.
Unknown date	Horriang	Merchantman	J. Davison	Sunderland	United Kingdom	For private owner.
Unknown date	Hull	Steamship	Humber Iron Works and Shipbuilding Company (Limited)	Hull	United Kingdom	For private owner.
Unknown date	Hypatia	Merchantman	T. Metcalf	Sunderland	United Kingdom	For Mr. Walker.
Unknown date	Ida	Merchantman	W. Barklay	Sunderland	United Kingdom	For J. Robinson.
Unknown date	Isabelle	steamship	Messrs. C. & W. Earle	Kingston upon Hull	United Kingdom	For private owner.
Unknown date	Isle of Beauty	Barque	T. Metcalfe	Sunderland	United Kingdom	For J. Potts.
Unknown date	Jane	Merchantan	Liddle & Sutcliffe	Sunderland	United Kingdom	For W. King.
Unknown date	Jane Avery	Merchantman	Taylor & Scouler	Sunderland	United Kingdom	For R. Avery.
Unknown date	Janet Allison	Brig		Perth	United Kingdom	For Messrs. James Allison & Son.
Unknown date	Jeanne et Mathilde	Merchantman	W. Blumer	Sunderland	United Kingdom	For private owner.
Unknown date	Jessie	Schooner	John Anderton	Runcorn	United Kingdom	For private owner.
Unknown date	John Eyston	Merchantman	Robert Thompson & Sons	Sunderland	United Kingdom	For Harrild Bros.
Unknown date	John Sherman	Paddle steamer			United Kingdom	For United States Revenue Cutter Service.
Unknown date	Julia Ann Gale	Brigantine	J. Rodgerson	Sunderland	United Kingdom	For Gale & Co.
Unknown date	Juliana	Barque	J. Gill	Sunderland	United Kingdom	For J. de Arano.
Unknown date	Juliet	Merchantman	Reay & Naisby	Sunderland	United Kingdom	For Cooper & Co.
Unknown date	Kingfisher	Fishing smack	Mr. Beeching	Wells-next-the-Sea	United Kingdom	For I. Wiseman.
Unknown date	Kinloch	Paddle steamer	A. & J. Inglis Ltd.	Glasgow	United Kingdom	For North British Railway.
Unknown date	Lady Head	Merchantman	G. & J. Mills	Sunderland	United Kingdom	For Hudson's Bay Company.
Unknown date	La Mare	Merchantman	J. Robinson	Sunderland	United Kingdom	For Adolphe et Cie.
8 December	Protectrice	Ironclad	Arsenal de Brest	Brest	France	For French Navy.'
Unknown date	Leader	Barque	R. Pace	Sunderland	United Kingdom	For Eggleston & Co.
Unknown date	Lena	Merchantman	James Laing	Sunderland	United Kingdom	For Norwood & Co.
Unknown date	Lennox Castle	Full-rigged ship	G. S. Moore	Sunderland	United Kingdom	For Mr. Skinner.
Unknown date	Leonie	Merchantman	J. Denniston	Sunderland	United Kingdom	For Jackson & Co.
Unknown date	Leyden	Steamship	James Tetlow	Chelsea, Massachusetts	United States	For private owner.
Unknown date	Limena	Paddle steamer	Messrs. Randolph, Elder & Co.	Glasgow	United Kingdom	For Pacific Steam Navigation Company.
Unknown date	Lizzie	Merchantman	G. Short	Sunderland	United Kingdom	For J. Russell.
Unknown date	Loch Lomond	Snow	Gibbon & Nichol	Sunderland	United Kingdom	For Dodd & Co.
Unknown date	Lore Brice	Steamship	Humber Iron Works and Shipbuilding Company (Limited)	Hull	United Kingdom	For private owner.
Unknown date	Lumley	Steamship	James Laong	Sunderland	United Kingdom	For Morton & Co.
Uninown date	Mabel	Merchantman	Humber Iron Works and Shipbuilding Company (Limited)	Hull	United Kingdom	For private owner.
Unknown date	Madby Ann	Merchantman	L. Wheatley	Sunderland	United Kingdom	For Graydon & Co.
Unknown date	Maitland	Full-rigged ship	William Pile	Sunderland	United Kingdom	For John R. Kelso.
Unknown date	Marinus	Snow	J. Lister	Sunderland	United Kingdom	For Wilkinson & Co.
Unknown date	Mary & Catherine	Merchantman	J. Briggs	Sunderland	United Kingdom	For J. Crisp.
Unknown date	Mary Ann	Barque	John Thompson	Sunderland	United Kingdom	For W. Richardson.
Unknown date	Mary Hick	Merchantman	J. Gill	Sunderland	United Kingdom	For Hick & Co.
Unknown date	Marys	Merchantman	J. Robinson	Sunderland	United Kingdom	For Varey & Co.
Unknown date	May Queen	Merchantman	William Pickersgill	Sunderland	United Kingdom	For Harper & Co.
Unknown date	Melania	Brig	Barkes	Sunderland	United Kingdom	For N. Olaguivel.
Unknown date	Memphis	Merchantman	W. Pile	Sunderland	United Kingdom	For Pile & Co.
Unknown date	Merlin	Barque	R. H. Potts	Sunderland	United Kingdom	For Potts & Co.
Unknown date	Millbank	Steamship			United Kingdom	For R. M. Hudson.
Unknown date	Miranda	Merchantman	W. Richardson	Sunderland	United Kingdom	For Mr. Rickinson.
Unknown date	Monkchester	Merchantman	G. Peverall	Sunderland	United Kingdom	For A. Strong.
Unknown date	Moorhill	Merchantman	A. Simey	Sunderland	United Kingdom	For Simey & Co.
Unknown date	Morning Glory	Merchantman	Robert Thompson & Sons	Sunderland	United Kingdom	For Tully & Son.
Unknown date	Narborough	Full-rigged ship			(United Kingdom of Great Britain and Ireland) Province of Canada	For private owner.
Unknown date	Natalian	Steamship	George Haswell	Sunderland	United Kingdom	For private owner.
Unknown date	Neva	Steamship	T. R. Oswald	Sunderland	United Kingdom	For John A. Dunkerley & Co.
Unknown date	Newbiggin	Barque	B. Hodgson	Sunderland	United Kingdom	For G. Dawson.
Unknown date	Northumbria	Merchantman	G. Bartram	Sunderland	United Kingdom	For Adamson & Co.
Unknown date	Northwick	Steamship	George Haswell	Sunderland	United Kingdom	For Gayner & Co.
Unknown date	Onward	Steamship	T. R. Oswald	Sunderland	United Kingdom	For T. R. Oswald.
Unknown date	Olinda	steamship	Messrs. C. & W. Earle	Kingston upon Hull	United Kingdom	For private owner.
Unknown date	Palos	Palos-class tug	James Tetlow	Chelsea, Massachusetts	United States	For United States Navy.
Unknown date	Parker	Smack	Brundrit & Whiteway	Runcorn	United Kingdom	For Brundrit & Whiteway.
Unknown date	Pauillac	Merchantman	R. Pace	Sunderland	United Kingdom	For Lopes et Cie.
Unknown date	Peggy	Schooner	Mr. Beeching	Wells-next-the-Sea	United Kingdom	For William Haywood.
Unknown date	Phantom	Schooner	Joseph D. Van Deusen	Williamsburg, New York	United States	For Henry G. Stebbins.
Unknown date	Phillis & Mary	Merchantman	James Hardie	Sunderland	United Kingdom	For Turnbull & Co.
Unknown date	Preston	Merchantman	W. Chilton	Sunderland	United Kingdom	For Hunton & Co.
Unknown date	Primus	Steamship	James Laing	Sunderland	United Kingdom	For Thomas & Co.
Unknown date	Prince Rupert	Barque	W. Briggs & Sons	Sunderland	United Kingdom	For Hudson's Bay Company.
Unknown date	Queen of the North	Merchantman	W. Pile	Sunderland	United Kingdom	For Ellis & Co.
Unknown date	Rebecca	Snow	J. M. Reed	Sunderland	United Kingdom	For Burnacle & Co.
Unknown date	Republic	Merchantman	John Blumer	Sunderland	United Kingdom	For Le Lacheur & Sons.
Unknown date	Robina	Merchantman	Taylor & Scouler	Sunderland	United Kingdom	For Taylor & Co.
Unknown date	Robin Hood	Full-rigged ship	Taylor & Scouler	Sunderland	United Kingdom	For Stuckey & Co.
Unknown date	Robinsons	Merchantman	Rawson & Watson	Sunderland	United Kingdom	For Robinson & Co.
Unknown date	Romeo	Merchantman	Reay & Naisby	Sunderland	United Kingdom	For D. C. Scott.
Unknown date	Rosetta	Barque	W. Barklay	Sunderland	United Kingdom	For Jacobs Bros.
Unknown date	Rosetta	Paddle steamer	James Ash & Sons	Blackwall	United Kingdom	For T. S. Begbie.
Unknown date	Rover	Fishing smack	Westaway	Lowestoft	United Kingdom	For William Rose.
Unknown date	Royal Standard	Merchantman	Edward Potts	Seaham	United Kingdom	For Dodds & Co.
Unknown date	Royal Union	Merchantman	W. Barklay	Sunderland	United Kingdom	For R. Ness.
Unknown date	Saint Angelo	Merchantman	Rawson & Watson	Sunderland	United Kingdom	For G. & J. Robinson.
Unknown date	Saint Vincent	Barque	William Pile	Sunderland	United Kingdom	For Devitt & Co.
Unknown date	Sallee Rover	Merchantman	William Doxford	Sunderland	United Kingdom	For Thomas Anderson & Co.
Unknown date	Sanderson	Barque	James Robinson	Sunderland	United Kingdom	For William Sanderson.
Unknown date	Sarah King	Merchantman	Liddle & Sutcliffe	Sunderland	United Kingdom	For J. King.
Unknown date	Scotland	Merchantman	T. Stonehouse	Sunderland	United Kingdom	For Brightman & Co.
Unknown date	Sea Drift	Merchantman	W. Naizby	Sunderland	United Kingdom	For J. Short.
Unknown date	Seminole	Clipper	Maxon & Fish	Mystic, Connecticut	United States	For Sutton & Co.
Unknown date	Shamokin	Gunboat	Reaney, Son & Archbold	Chester, Pennsylvania	United Kingdom	For United States Navy.
Unknown date	Shawnee	Casco-class monitor	James Tetlow, and Curtis & Tilden	Boston, Massachusetts	United Kingdom	For United States Navy.
Unknown date	Sisters	Brig	L. Wheatley	North Hylton	United Kingdom	For J. Hall.
Unknown date	Southwick	Barque	Robert Thompson & Sons	Sunderland	United Kingdom	For Walker & Co.
Unknown date	Souvenir	Barque	Blumer & Co	Sunderland	United Kingdom	For Walker & Co.
Unknown date	Spaewife	Barque			United Kingdom	For private owner.
Unknown date	Spring	Merchantman	George Barker	Sunderland	United Kingdom	For W. Kish.
Unknown date	Star of Gwent	Merchantman	J. Robinson	Sunderland	United Kingdom	For H. Beynon.
Unknown date	Star of Peace	Brig	Blumer & Co.	Sunderland	United Kingdom	For F. Stafford.
Unknown date	Star of the East	Barque	W. Pile	Sunderland	United Kingdom	For Pardew & Co.
Unknown date	Star of the North	Full-rigged ship	Pile, Hay & Co	Sunderland	United Kingdom	For Pardew & Co.
Unknown date	Star of the South	Full-rigged ship	Pile, Hay & Co	Sunderland	United Kingdom	For Pardew & Co.
Unknown date	Swift	Mersey flat	Brundrit & Whiteway	Runcorn	United Kingdom	For Brundrit & Whiteway.
Unknown date	Syv Brodre	Brig	W. Adamson	Sunderland	United Kingdom	For P. Clausen.
Unknown date	Silvado	Silvado-class ironclad		Bordeaux	France	For Imperial Brazilian Navy.
Unknown date	Sirius	steamship	Messrs. C. & W. Earle	Kingston upon Hull	United Kingdom	For private owner.
Unknown date	Sir Lancelot	Clipper	Robert Steele & Company	Greenock	United Kingdom	For John McCunn.
Unknown date	Standish	Tug		Boston, Massachusetts	United States	For United States Navy.
Unknown date	Sub Marine Explorer	Submarine	Julius H. Kroehl & Ariel Patterson	Williamsburg, New York	United States	For Julius H. Kroehl & Ariel Patterson.
Unknown date	Suncook	Casco-class monitor	Globe Works	Boston, Massachusetts	United States	For United States Navy.
Unknown date	Tae Wan	Merchantman	G. Peverall	Sunderland	United Kingdom	For Mr. Davison.
Unknown date	Tavistock	Merchantman	J. Davison	Sunderland	United Kingdom	For W. Atkinson.
Unknown date	Titania	Merchantman	Reay & Naisby	Sunderland	United Kingdom	For D. C. Scott.
Unknown date	Triana	Tug	William Perrine	New York	United States	For United States Navy.
Unknown date	Two Brothers	Fishing trawler	R. S. Abbott & Co.	Hull	United Kingdom	For Philip S. Whiteway.
Unknown date	Tynedale	Merchantman	William Pickersgill	Sunderland	United Kingdom	For J. & H. Scott.
Unknown date	United Service	Merchantman	George Haswell	Sunderland	United Kingdom	For private owner.
Unknown date	Unity	Merchantman	J. Barkes	Sunderland	United Kingdom	For J. Smith.
Unknown date	Verena	Merchantman	Peter Austin	Sunderland	United Kingdom	For Ayre & Co.
Unknown date	Vigilant	Merchantman	Rawson & Watson	Sunderland	United Kingdom	For J. Hall.
Unknown date	Wakefield	steamship	Messrs. C. & W. Earle	Kingston upon Hull	United Kingdom	For private owner.
Unknown date	Wanderer	Barque	W. H. Pearson	Sunderland	United Kingdom	For Ayre & Co.
Unknown date	Warkworth Castle	Snow	L. wheatley	Sunderland	United Kingdom	For J. Shotton.
Unknown date	Waterlily	Snow	Gray & Young	Sunderland	United Kingdom	For J. Cole.
Unknown date	Waubuno	Paddle steamer	Melancthon Simpson	Port Robinson	(United Kingdom of Great Britain and Ireland) Province of Canada	For Georgian Bay Transportation Company.
Unknown date	Wear	Merchantman	T. R. Oswald	Sunderland	United Kingdom	For Oswald & Co.
Unknown date	Weardale	Merchantman	J. & J. Gibbon	North Hylton	United Kingdom	For T. & E. Gardiner.
Unknown date	W. E. Gladstone	Barque	G. Peverall	Sunderland	United Kingdom	For Glover Bros.
Unknown date	Wilfread	Merchantman	Humber Iron Works and Shipbuilding Company (Limited)	Hull	United Kingdom	For private owner.
Unknown date	William Clowes	Merchantman	James Robinson	Sunderland	United Kingdom	For J. Robinson.
Unknown date	William Dyer	Brig	J. & E. Lumsden	Sunderland	United Kingdom	For Dyer & Co.
Unknown date	William Shillito	Barque	J. Davison	Sunderland	United Kingdom	For Anderson & Co.
Unknown date	William Thurlbeck	Merchantman	James Crown	Sunderland	United Kingdom	For Wilkinson & Co.
Unknown date	Zephyr	Schooner	Philip Bellot	Gorey	(United Kingdom of Great Britain and Ireland) Jersey	For Charles Hamling.
Unknown date	Zanoni	Barque	W. H. Potter & Co.	Liverpool	United Kingdom	For Thomas Royden & Son.
Unknown date	Unnamed	Steamship	Messrs. Henderson, Coulborn & Co.	Renfrew	United Kingdom	Built on speculation. Subsequently sold to the Netherlands and named Heinrich Heister.
Unknown date	Unnamed	Barge	W. Johnson	Sunderland	United Kingdom	For Armstrong & Co.
