= Karanja =

Karanja may refer to:

== Places ==
- Karanja Lad, a city in Washim, Maharashtra
- Karanja (Ghadge), Wardha, a tehsil in Maharashtra
- Karanja, Raigad, a town in Maharashtra
- Karanja, Bangladesh
- Karanja, Tasmania, a rural locality in Australia
- Karanja Assembly constituency, constituency of the Maharashtra Legislative Assembly
- Karanja River, a tributary of the Manjira in southern India

== Other uses ==
- SS Karanja
- Karanja oil, an oil made from seeds of Millettia pinnata

== See also ==
- Karanj (disambiguation)
