= Karanj =

Karanj or Karenj may refer to:

- Karanj, Kohgiluyeh and Boyer-Ahmad, Iran
- Karanj, Dezful, Khuzestan Province, Iran
- Karanj, Izeh, Khuzestan Province, Iran
- Karanj (Vidhan Sabha constituency), Gujarat, India
- Karanj (Marathi: करंज), Pongamia pinnata, a species of tree in the pea family, Fabaceae, native to Asia
- INS Karanj (S21), a diesel-electric submarine of the Indian Navy

== See also ==
- Karanja (disambiguation)
