= Karbeh =

Karbeh (Persian: كربه or كاربح) may refer to:

- Karbeh, Isfahan (كربه - Karbeh)
- Karbeh, Khuzestan (كاربح - Kārbeḩ)
