= Glenora, Tasmania =

Glenora Tasmania
- Coordinates: 42°41′51″S 146°53′41″E
- Population: 78 (2016 census)
- Postcode(s): 7140
- Location: 20 km (12 mi) NW of New Norfolk
- LGA(s): Derwent Valley
- Region: South-east
- State electorate(s): Lyons
- Federal division(s): Lyons
Localities around Glenora:
Gretna	Gretna	Gretna
Karanja, Westerway	Glenora	Gretna
Westerway	Bushy Park, Macquarie Plains	Macquarie Plains

Glenora is a rural locality in the local government area (LGA) of Derwent Valley in the South-east LGA region of Tasmania. The locality is about 20 kilometres (12 mi) north-west of the town of New Norfolk. The 2016 census recorded a population of 78 for the state suburb of Glenora.

== History ==
Glenora was gazetted as a locality in 1959.

It is believed that the name was intended to be Glen Nora, after the daughter of a pioneer of the district, but it was corrupted over time.

== Geography ==
The Tyenna River forms part of the northern boundary until it meets the Derwent River, which then forms the remainder of the northern boundary and part of the eastern. The Derwent Valley Railway line runs through from south-east to north-west.

== Road infrastructure ==
Route B61 (Gordon River Road) runs through from south to north-west.
