= Elwick =

Elwick is the name of the following places:

In the United Kingdom:

- Elwick, County Durham, a village and civil parish
- Elwick, Northumberland, a village
- Elwick, Orkney (Norse: Ellidarvik)
- Elwick Bay, on the south coast of Shapinsay, one of the Orkney Islands

In Australia:

- Electoral division of Elwick, Tasmania
- Elwick, an area of Glenorchy, Tasmania, a suburb of Hobart
  - Elwick Road, a major arterial road
