= Cowcatcher =

Device at the front of a locomotive to deflect an obstacle from the track

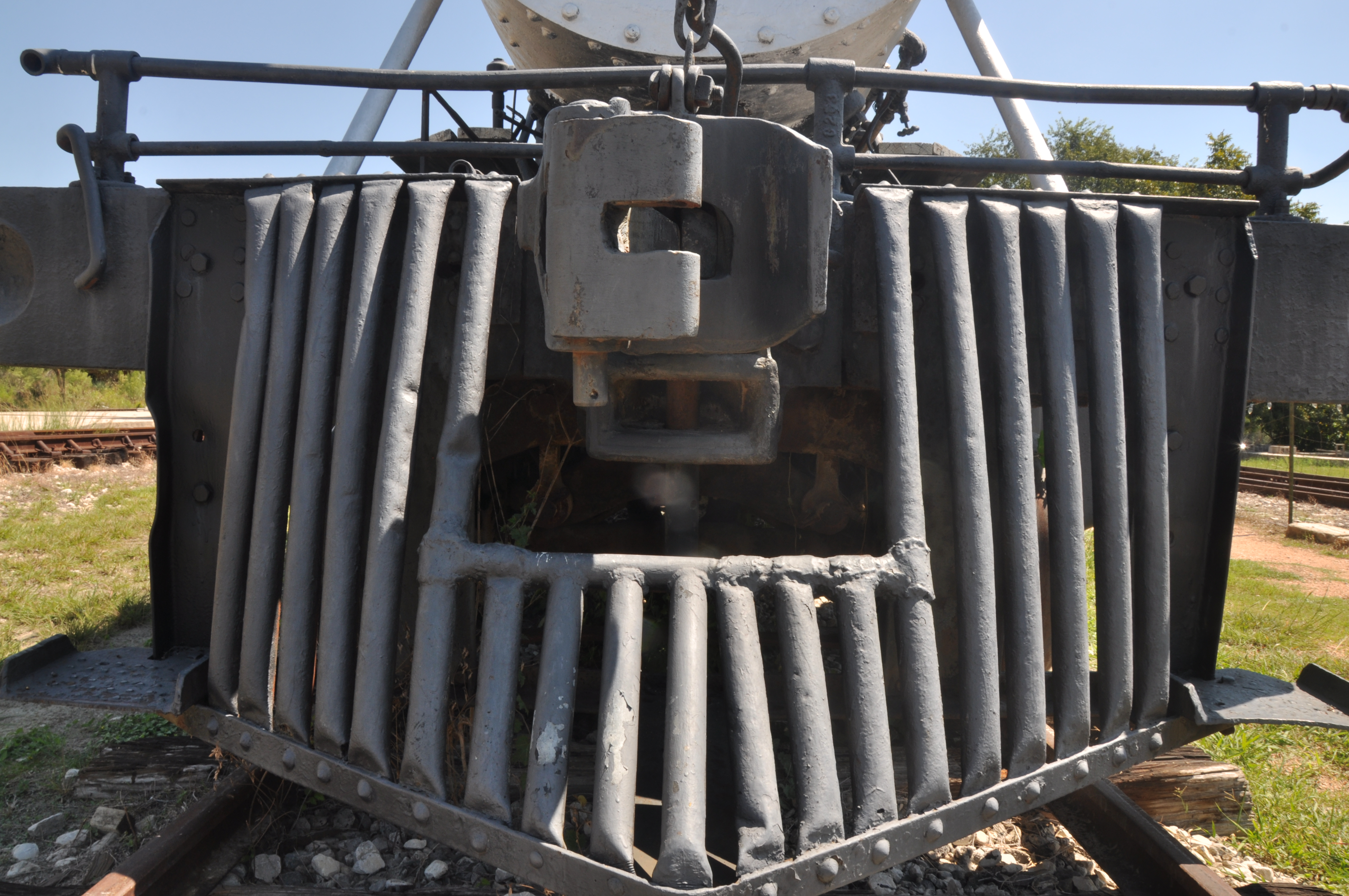
Cowcatcher of an American 1911 Baldwin steam locomotive at the Texas Transportation Museum

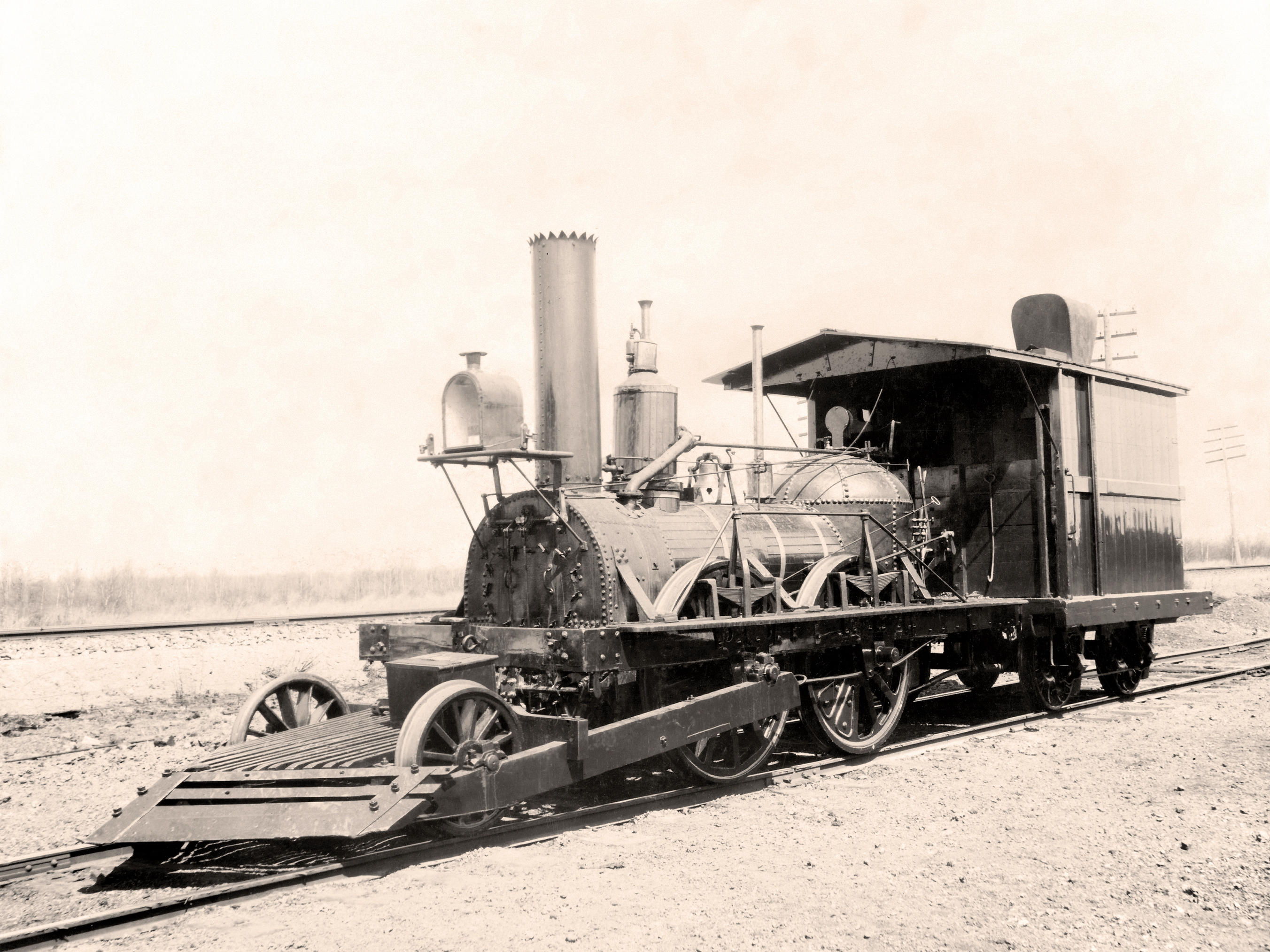
Leading truck and cowcatcher on the John Bull

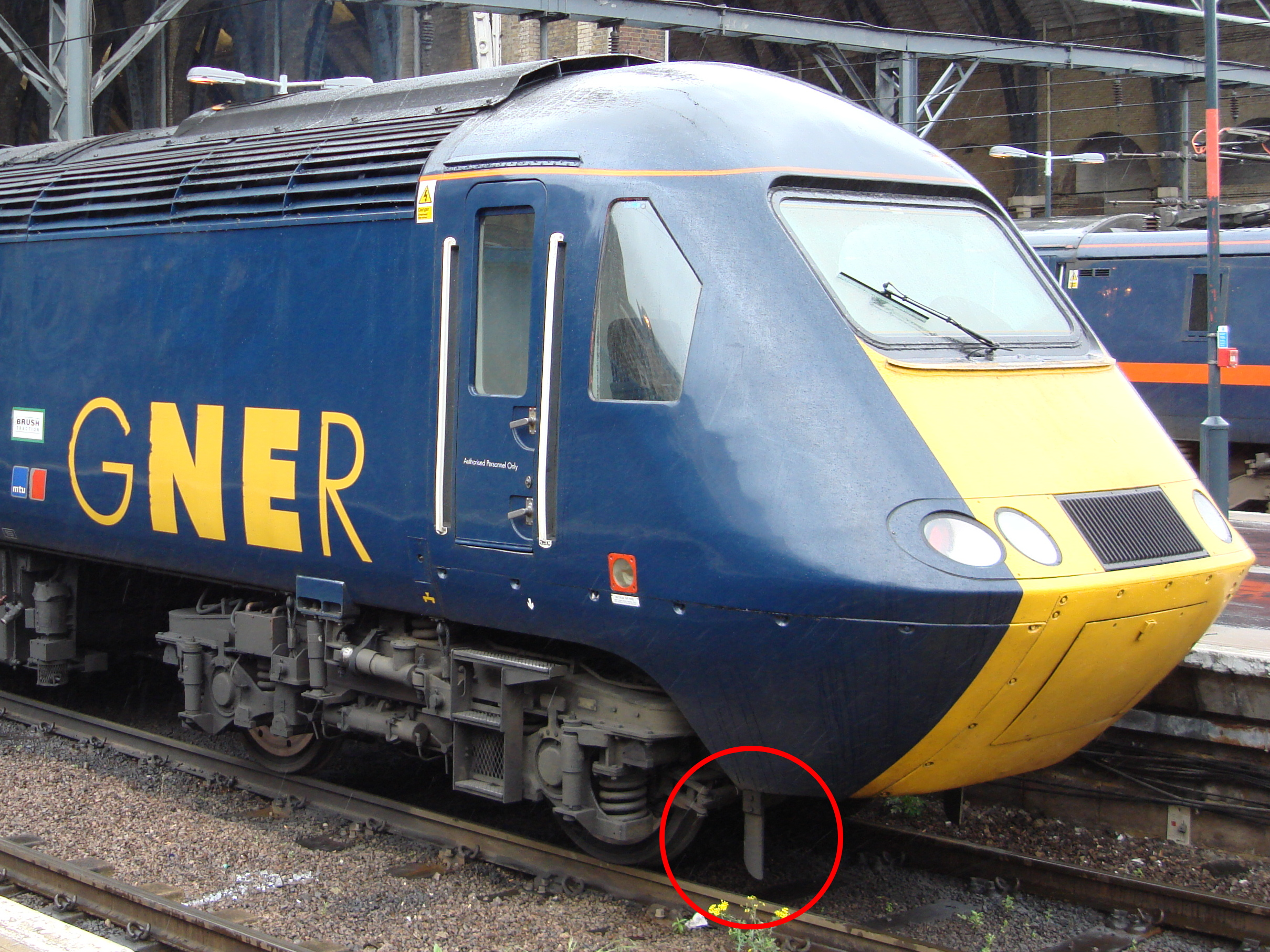
Lifeguard (circled) on a British HST powercar

A cowcatcher, also known as a pilot, is the device mounted at the front of a locomotive to deflect obstacles on the track that might otherwise damage or derail it or the train.

In the UK, small metal bars called life-guards, rail guards or guard irons are provided immediately in front of the wheels. They knock away smaller obstacles lying directly on the running surface of the railhead. Historically, fenced-off railway systems in Europe relied exclusively on those devices and cowcatchers were not required, but in modern systems cowcatchers have generally superseded them.

Instead of a cowcatcher, trams use a device called a fender. Objects lying on the tram track come in contact with a sensor bracket, which triggers the lowering of a basket-shaped device to the ground, preventing the overrunning of the obstacles and pushing them along the road surface in front of the wheels.

In snowy areas the cowcatcher also has the function of a snowplow.

== Invention ==
An idea for a cowcatcher was proposed by Charles Babbage in 1830, during his period of working for the Liverpool and Manchester Railway. However, Babbage's invention was not constructed, and it is uncertain whether later manufacturers were aware of Babbage's idea.

The first practical cowcatcher is widely credited to Isaac Dripps, who fitted one to the John Bull in 1833, shortly after steam haulage commenced on the Camden and Amboy Railroad. His design is described and illustrated in David Stevenson's book Sketch of the Civil Engineering of North America, published in 1838.

== Design ==
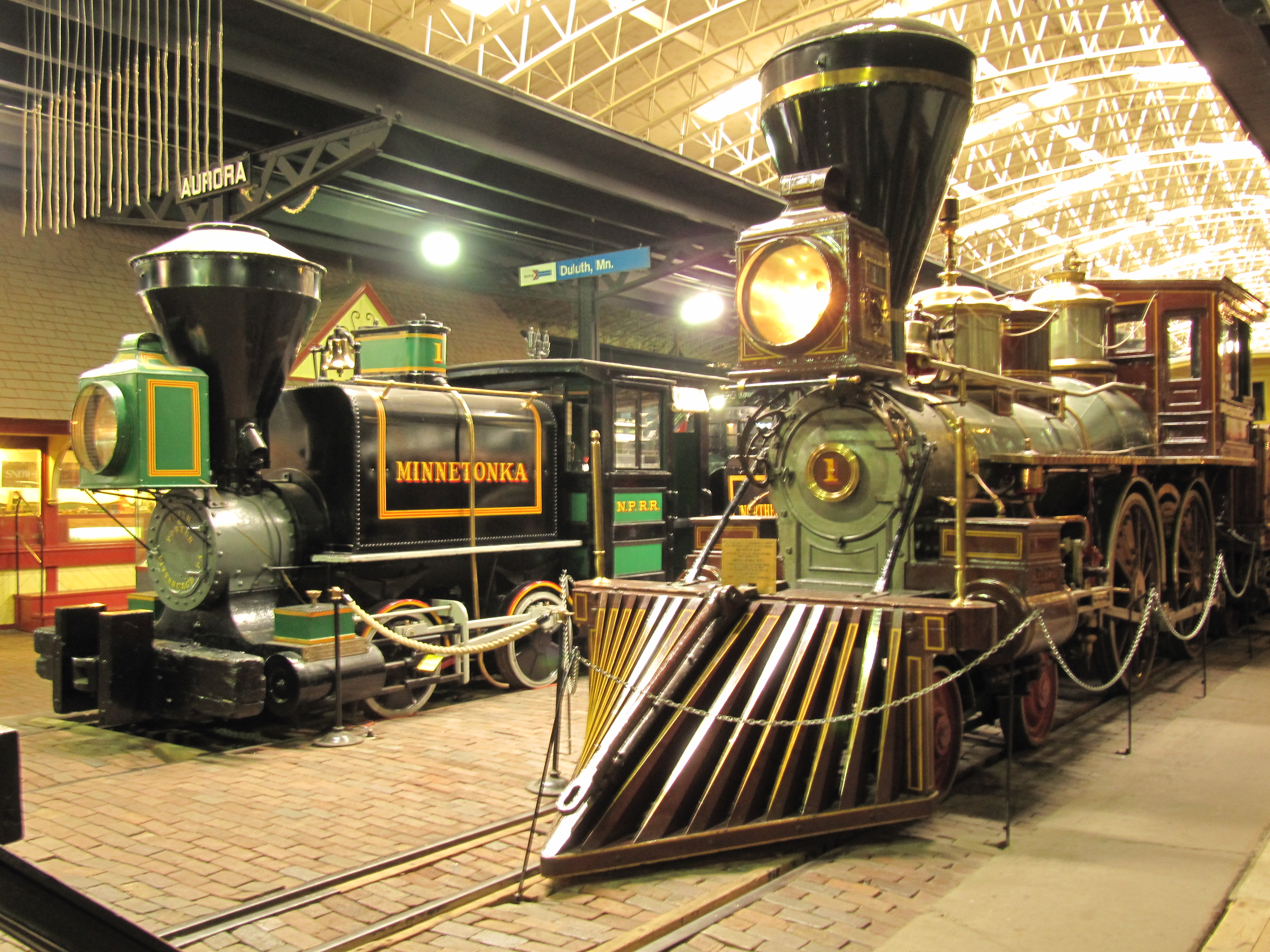
Old Timers at the Lake Superior Railroad Museum, Duluth, Minnesota

On a mainline locomotive, the cowcatcher has to successfully deflect an obstacle hit at speed. The design principle is to push the object upwards and sideways out of the way and not to lift the locomotive on impact.

The typical shape is a blunt wedge with a shallow V-shape in plan. In the later days of steam locomotives, the front coupler was designed to swing out of the way also, so it could not get caught up; this was called a 'drop coupler pilot'.

Early on, cowcatchers were normally fabricated of bars mounted on a frame; later on, sheet metal cowcatchers were often used for their additional smoothness, and some cast steel cowcatchers were employed for their mass and smooth shape. Early diesel locomotives followed the same plan.

Cowcatchers on early switcher locomotives in the US often had steps (called "footboard pilots") to allow yard workers to ride with the locomotive. In some countries, footboard pilots are outlawed for safety reasons, and have been removed. Modern locomotives often have front and rear platforms with safety rails, or deeply recessed steps, where workers can ride.

== Modern cowcatchers ==
Most modern European rail vehicles must have cowcatchers with a snowplow function and rail guards. The required strength of the system is 30 kN (6,700 lbf) in the middle of the track and 50 kN (11,000 lbf) near the rails.

Modern US diesel locomotives have flatter, less wedge-shaped cowcatchers, because a diesel locomotive has the cab near the front, and the crew are vulnerable to impact from obstacles pushed up by the cowcatcher.

== Anti-climbers ==
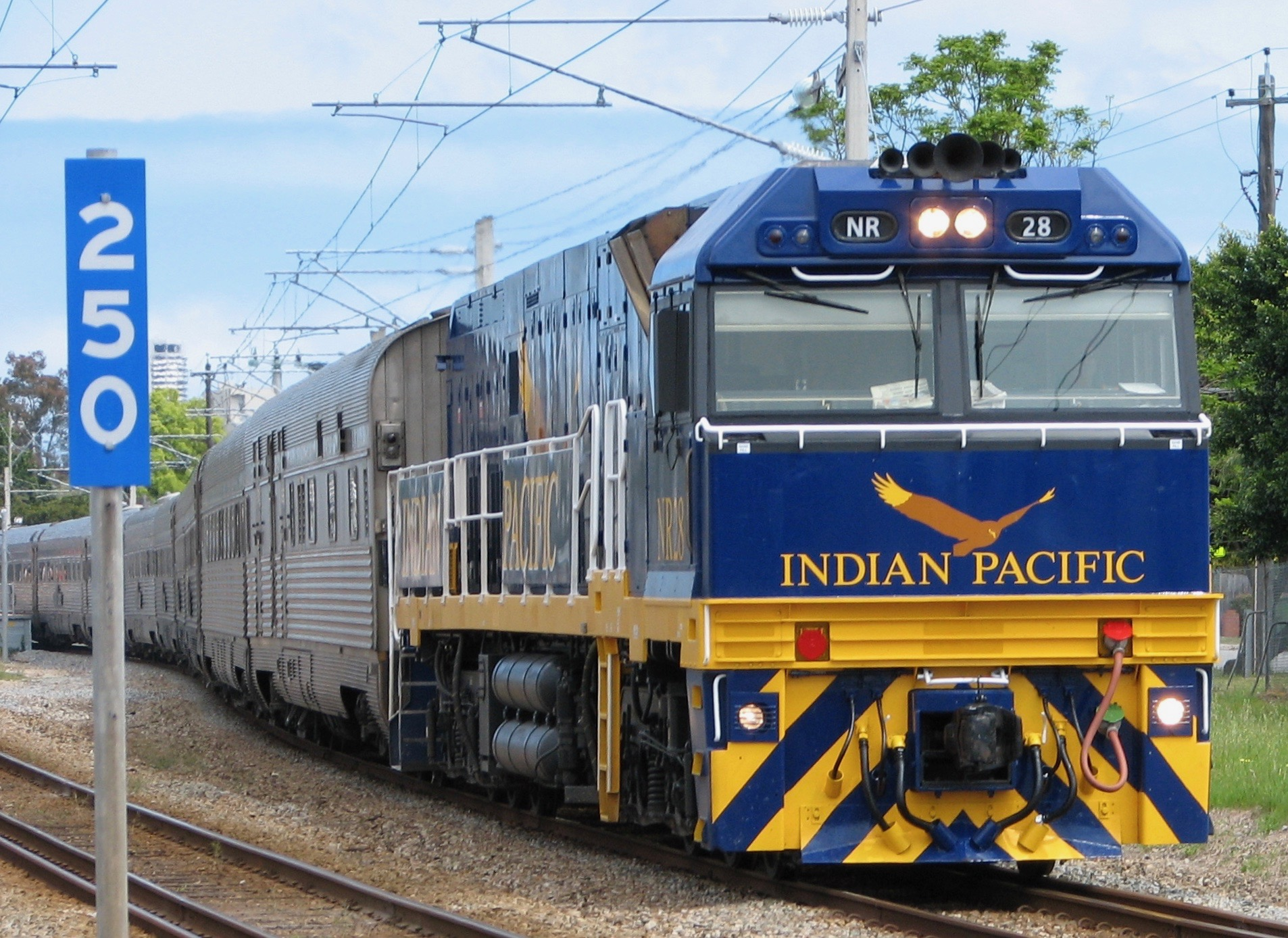
An anti-climber on the front of an Australian NR class diesel locomotive

To protect the crew and passengers, most modern locomotives have a horizontally grooved steel beam known as an anti-climber fitted across the front, above the coupler. Its purpose is to prevent colliding locomotives from riding up and moving over the locomotive frame through the cab ("telescoping").

== See also ==
- Bullbar
- Buffer (rail transport)
- Buffer stop
- Headstock (rolling stock)
