= Karanja, Tasmania =

Karanja Tasmania
- Coordinates: 42°41′02″S 146°50′17″E
- Population: 28 (2016 census)
- Postcode(s): 7140
- Location: 26 km (16 mi) NW of New Norfolk
- LGA(s): Derwent Valley
- Region: South-east
- State electorate(s): Lyons
- Federal division(s): Lyons
Localities around Karanja:
Westerway	Glenora	Glenora
Westerway	Karanja	Glenora
Westerway	Glenora	Glenora

Karanja is a rural locality in the local government area (LGA) of Derwent Valley in the South-east LGA region of Tasmania. The locality is about 26 kilometres (16 mi) north-west of the town of New Norfolk. The 2016 census recorded a population of 28 for the state suburb of Karanja.

== History ==
Karanja was gazetted as a locality in 1959. Karanja is a city in India, named after Saint Karanj. Three ships of this name, and this locality, appear to have been named from this source.

== Geography ==
The Tyenna River forms the north-western boundary. The Derwent Valley Railway line forms part of the northern boundary before passing through to the south-west.

== Road infrastructure ==
Route B61 (Gordon River Road) runs along the southern boundary. From there Karanja Court provides access to the locality.

== See also ==
- SS Karanja (1865)
