= Guard rail (rail transport) =

Type of railroad rail

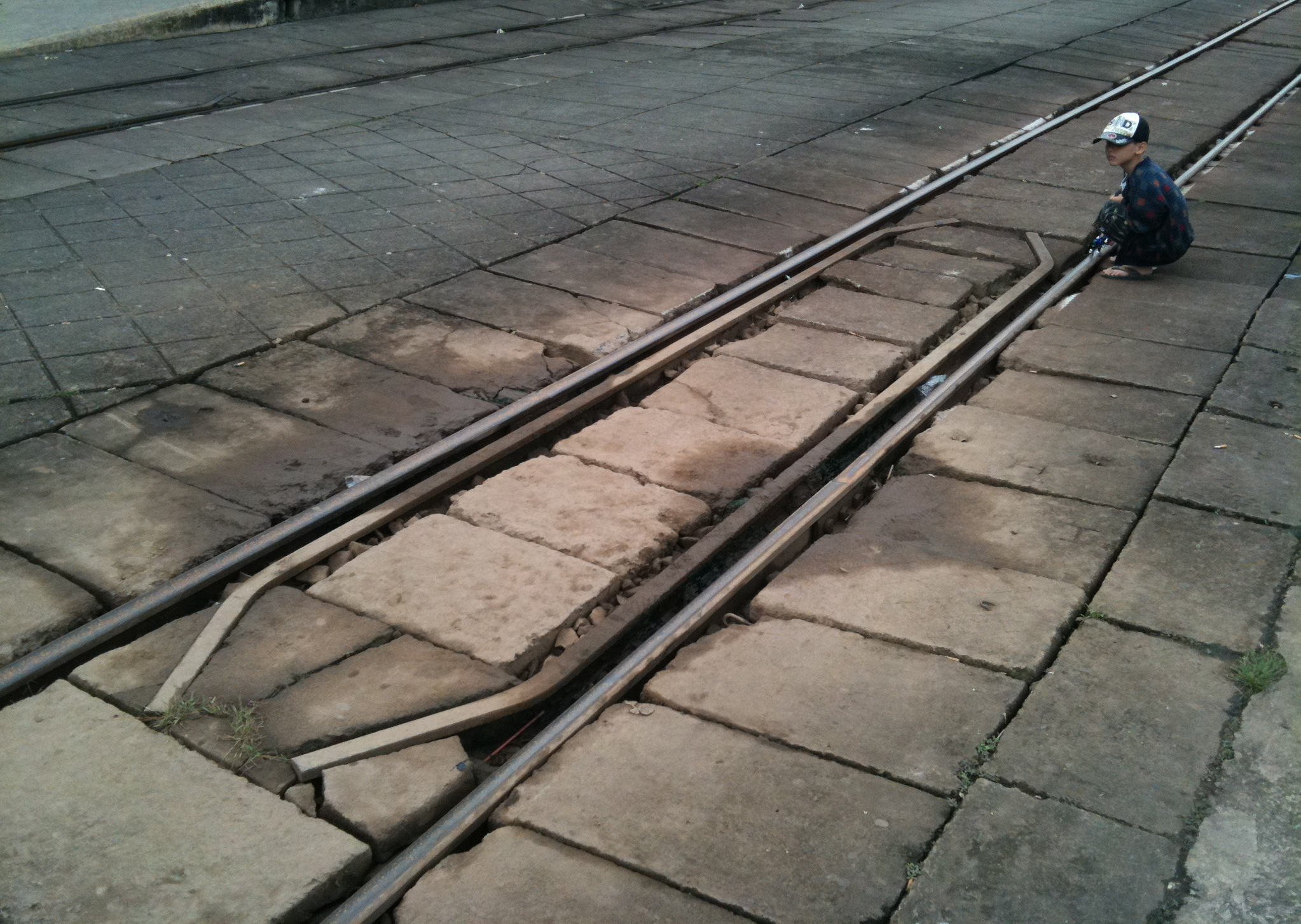
Guard rails at Diêu Trì railway station, Vietnam

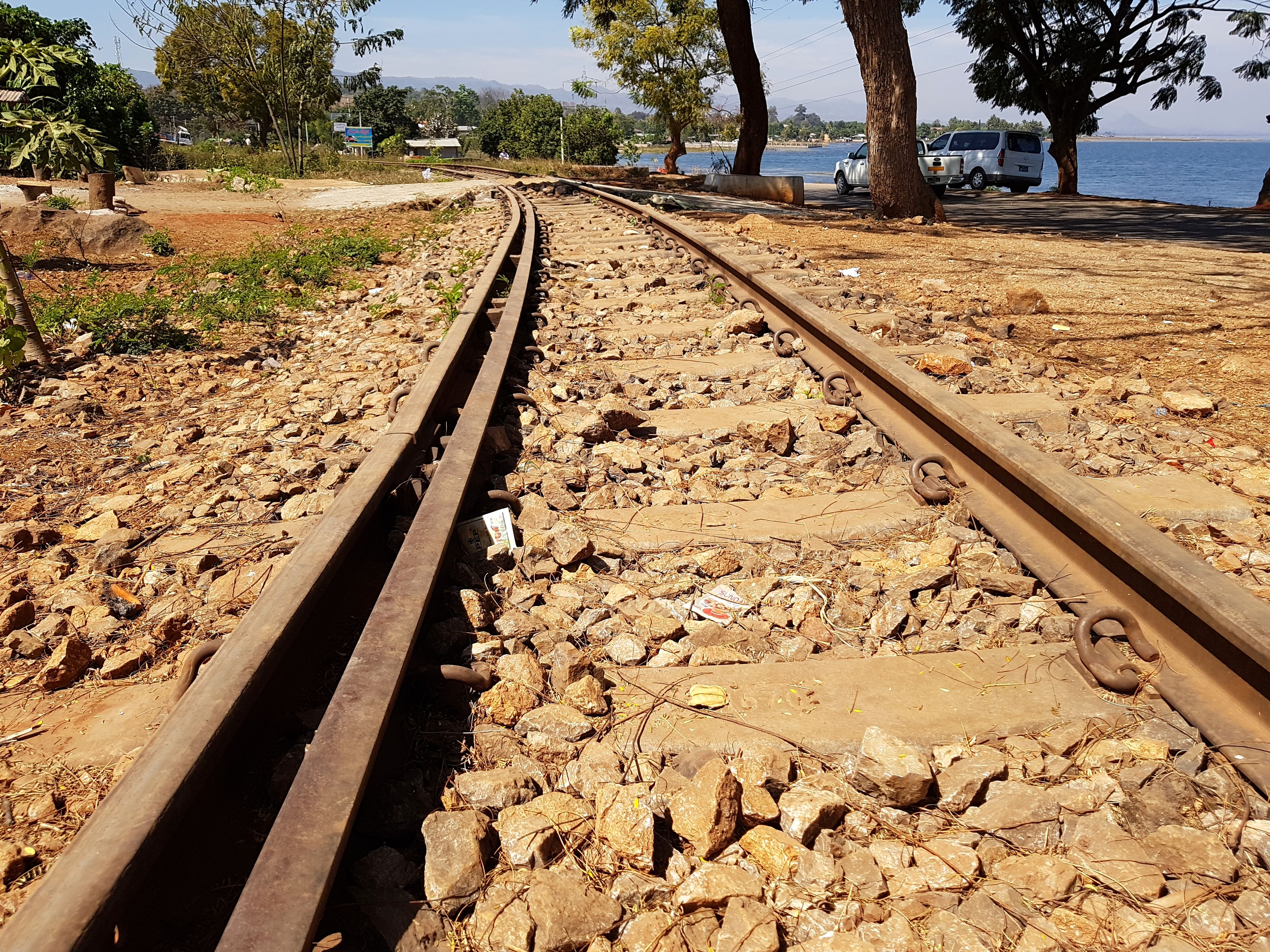
This curved track in Myanmar, near Pekon, includes a check rail on the inside rail of the curve

In rail transport, guard rails or check rails are rails used in the construction of the track, placed parallel to regular running rail to keep the wheels of rolling stock in alignment to prevent (or at least reduce the severity of) derailment. They are generally used along areas of restricted clearance, such as a bridge, trestle, tunnel, or level crossing. They also help to minimize damage to the structure and allow easier post-accident cleanup.

As per UK/Australian terminology, guard rails and check rails perform distinctly different functions. However, US terminology refers to both types as guard rails, despite their differing functions.

Check rails are located relatively close to the corresponding running rail (typically around 42 mm for standard gauge railways), such that the wheels of rail vehicles regularly contact the side of the check rail. Such contact is essential for the function of the check rail, i.e. to prevent derailment of opposing wheels when passing through sharp curves or switches (turnouts). The distance from the contact face of the check rail to the opposing running rail is critical and referred to as the check gauge effectiveness (typically 1390-1392 mm for standard gauge railways.

On the other hand, guard rails are located further away from the adjacent running rail such that the wheels do not make contact with the guard rail under normal operation. The purpose of a guard rail is to guide a derailed wheel to maintain the derailed vehicle roughly in line with the track to prevent a more serious derailment. The spacing between the guard rail and adjacent running rail is usually somewhat greater than maximum with of the wheels, such that a derailed wheel can travel between the running rail and guard rail. Typical spacing is 200-380 mm for standard gauge railways.).

== History ==
Although guard rails in some form have been used as long as there have been trains, the precursor of the guard rails in use today was detailed in U.S. patent 522,038, filed in 1893 by Gorham B. Ames, based in Laconia, New Hampshire, US.

== Applications ==
=== Bridges ===
The object of the guard rail is to prevent a derailed truck from getting far enough off the track to strike any portion of the girder, or from becoming twisted so as to lead to further derailment ... guard rails are requisite, so arranged as to bring a derailed truck nearly back to its proper position and guide it across the bridge without allowing it to deviate more than a few inches from the rails.

— Massachusetts Board of Railroad Commissioners, Report of the Board of Railroad Commissioners in Relation to the Accident on the Boston and Maine Railroad (Western Division), Near Bradford, January 10, 1888

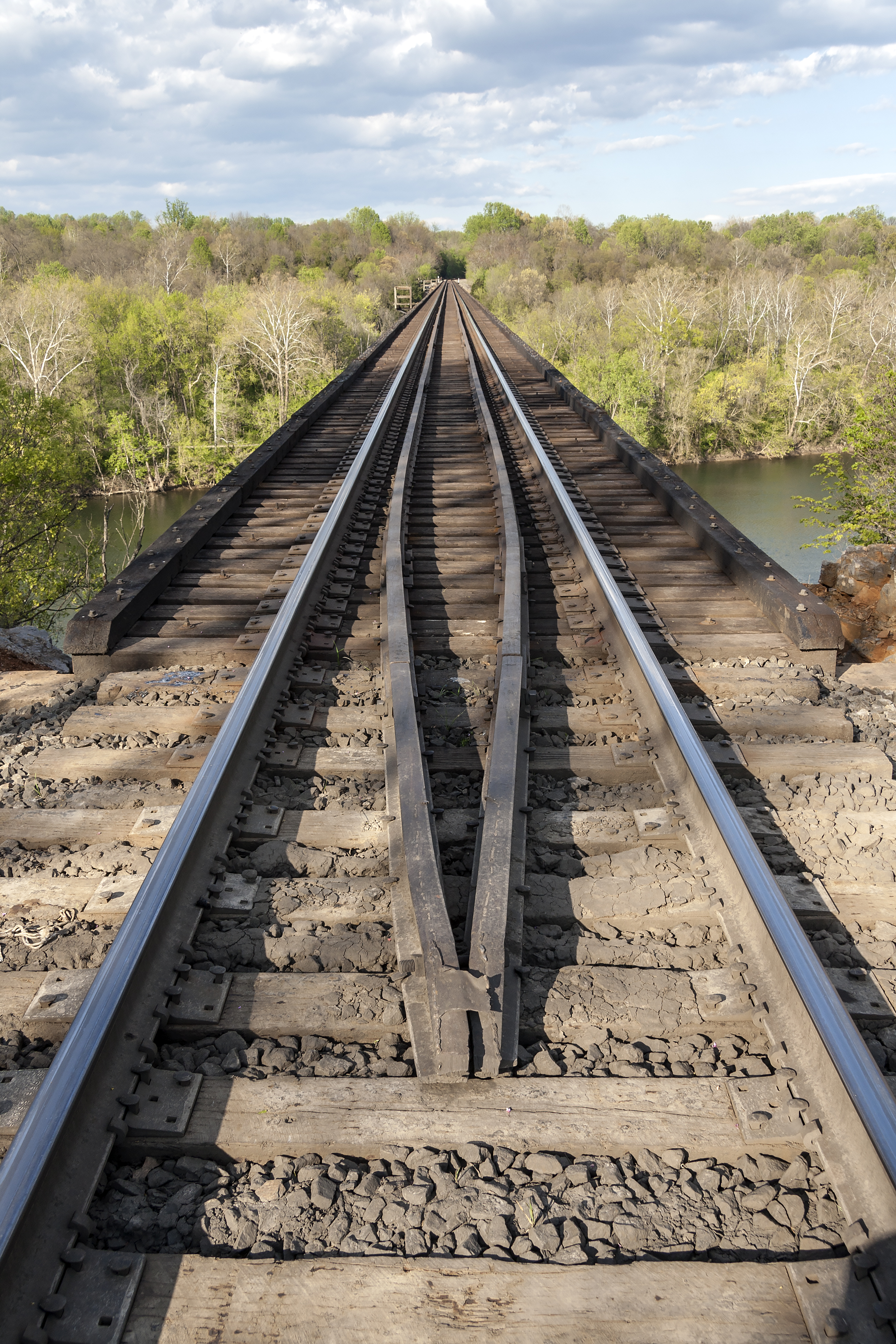
Guard rails on a bridge in West Virginia

Guard rails are an essential component of railroad bridges. Their presence prevents a derailed train from striking and damaging bridge components, or deviating from the track enough to leave the tracks entirely and roll over or fall.

=== Sharp curves ===
On sharp curves, check rails may be placed inside the inner rail, where they engage the back of the flange of the wheel on that side.

=== Switches ===
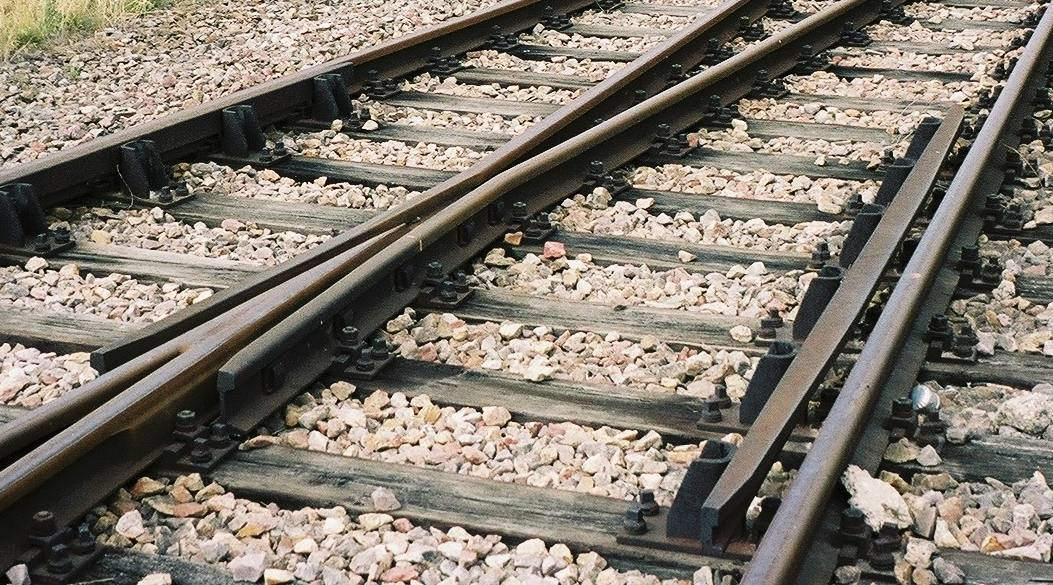
Check rails in use on a switch

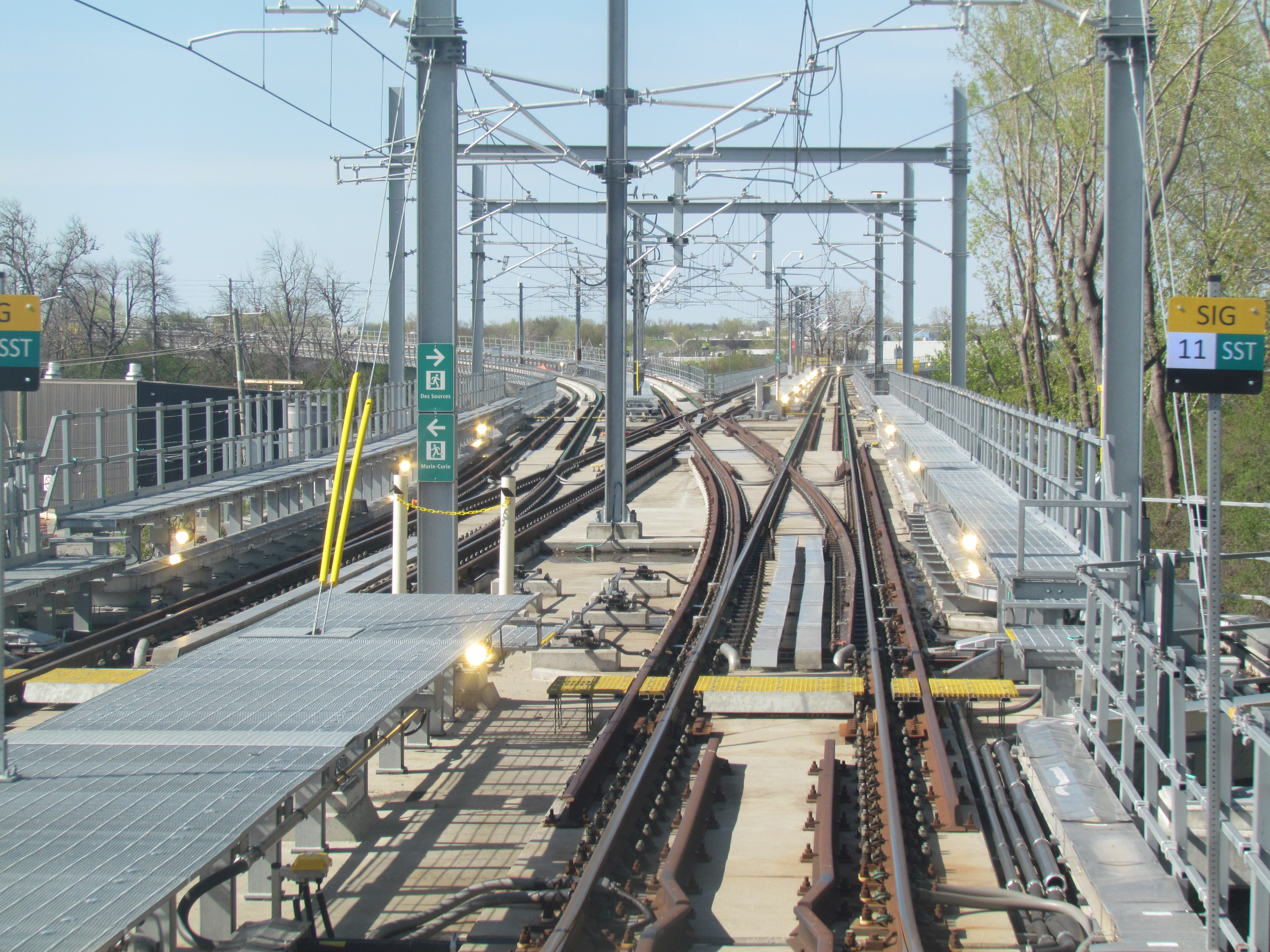
A mix of check rails and guard rails, both inside and outside the running rails, at a junction on an elevated guideway

Check rails may be incorporated in switches, where they serve to prevent derailments caused by a train's wheels passing through the wrong side of the frog (the point where the straight and diverging rails cross). Check rails in this case are typically bolted to the traffic rails on each end, with a clamp placed towards the center to prevent movement.

== See also ==
- Guide bar
- Guide rail
