= SS Karanja =

Three steam ships have been named Karanja:

- SS Karanja (1865), a paddle steamer built in 1865 and home-ported in Bombay
- SS Karanja (1930), a steamship bombed and sunk off Algeria in 1942
- SS Karanja (1948), passenger steamer that sailed routes in the Indian Ocean
