= Adelphoi (1865) =

19th-century barque built in Sunderland, England

Coordinates: 34°05′48″S 151°10′00″E

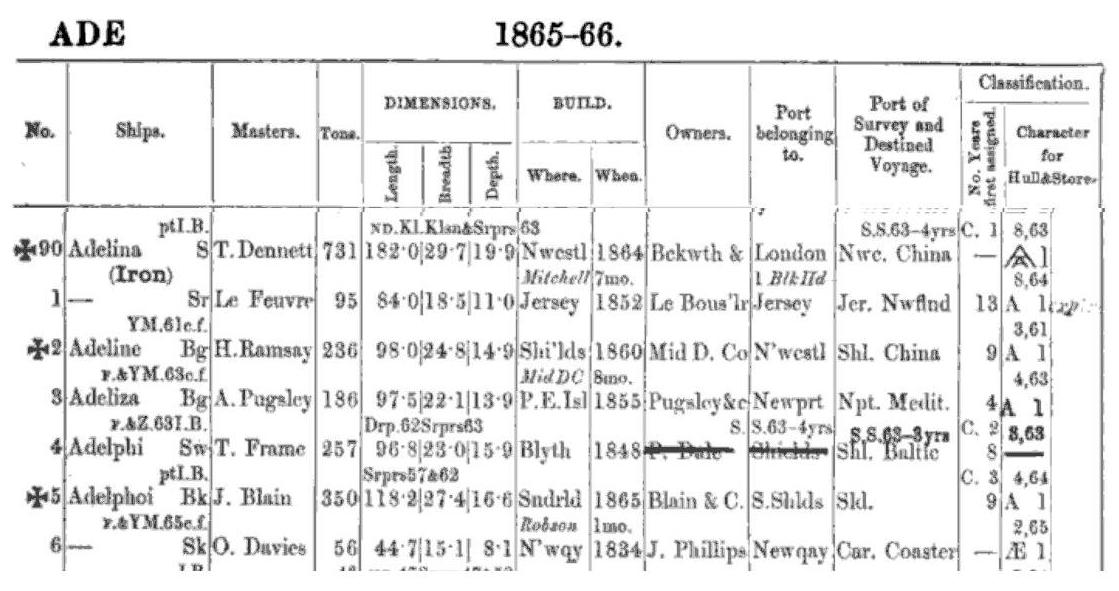
- Lloyd's Register of British and Foreign Shipping 1865 Entry

History

New South Wales
- Name: Adelphoi
- Owner: A A Farthing & W H Gregory
- Port of registry: Newcastle, New South Wales
- Builder: Thos Robson County Durham, Sunderland, United Kingdom
- Completed: 1865
- Identification: Registration no. 13/1875; Official no. 47173
- Fate: Wrecked 21 December 1879

General characteristics
- Type: Wood carvel barquentine
- Tonnage: 359 GRT
- Displacement: 348 NRT
- Length: 36.02 m
- Beam: 8.351 m
- Draught: 5.059 m
- Crew: 10

The Adelphoi was a wooden barque built in Sunderland, England, that spent most of her working life in Australian waters. She was wrecked off Port Hacking, Australia, in 1879.

== Service history ==
=== 1874-75 ===
The Adelphoi seems to have first made its way into Australian waters in 1874 via Java, leaving Cherilbon on 1 October with a full cargo of sugar. The vessel then arrived in Melbourne and began discharging and receiving cargo at the Sandridge town pier.

In January 1875, the vessel was put up for sale by MacFarlan, Blyth, and Co. Upon her sale in June, the master made his return to London via the Northumberland.

=== 1876-79 ===
On 19 May 1876, the Adelphoi sailed from Newcastle, New South Wales harbour for Lyttelton, New Zealand and arrived on 9 June 1876. In September 1876 it was reported that the Adelphoi and Natal Queen were loading at Lyttelton and bound for Melbourne, with 10,000 bags of oats.

On 15 December 1876, the Adelphoi arrived back at her new home port at Newcastle harbour. She made several more trips between Newcastle and Lyttelton over the course of the next three years.

== Shipwreck event ==
On the morning of 21 December 1879, the Adolphoi was bound from Adelaide to Newcastle when she struck a reef about a mile off Port Hacking. The hold quickly began to fill up with water, and the captain and crew were forced to abandon the ship. They took to the lifeboats, and reached Port Hacking without incident.

W H Gregory, the master of the Adelphoi, was called upon to show why his certificate should not be suspended or cancelled for his error in navigating the barque so close to land. The master claimed that it would have been useless to anchor and that he did everything he could to save the vessel. He claimed he had been a careful navigator for upward of 19 years. The board considered the matter and could not overlook the fact that the barque might have been kept further from shore, and the anchor dropped. They decided to suspend Captain Gregory's certificate for three months from the time of the wreck.

The Adelphoi was insured with the New Zealand Insurance Company for £2,000. The vessel was in ballast.
