= SS Millbank =

British steamship (1865–1866)

History

United Kingdom
- Name: SS Millbank
- Owner: R.M. Hudson
- Completed: 1865
- Out of service: 24 November 1866
- Fate: wrecked at the Netherland

General characteristics
- Tonnage: 548 BRT
- Depth: 15m
- Installed power: 110 hp

SS Millbank sometimes wrongly written as SS Millbanke was a 1865 built British steamship. The ship weighed 548 BRT. Its home port was Sunderland. The ship was owned by R.M. Hudson. The captain of the ship was Smith. In November 1866 the ship wrecked at the Netherlands. The crew was saved by another ship.

Some of the cargo and parts of the ship was salvaged and auctioned over multiple sales.

The wreck was rediscovered over 100 years later and became from 1986 an interesting location for explorers. Over another 25 years later, the wreck and remainings were professionally salvaged in 2013.

== Ship details ==
The ship weighed 548 BRT. The engine room included a large 2-cylinder compound steam engine and two Scottish boilers, each with two fire passages. The ship had a four-bladed iron propeller of around 3.5 meters in diameter.

The ship had several skull blocks and corve nails in the railing, indicating that it was also a sailing ship.

== Fate ==
From 12 November 1866 she was with Captain Smith on voyage from Kronstadt, Russian Empire to London, United Kingdom with a cargo of flour and wool. On 21 November 1866 the steamship was abandoned in the North Sea. Her crew were rescued by George (Prussia) of captain Thiis, from Norway bound for Hull. On 24 November 1866 she was driven ashore and wrecked on Vlieland, Friesland, Netherlands.

== Cargo ==
During the first few days 60 bales of wheat flour and four bales of wool came on shore. Also a box marked Millbank came on shore.

On 11 December 1866, a sale took place Terschelling of 49 bales of flour and 7 bales of wool lying in the warehouse on Terschelling. Another large sale took place on 16 December on Vlieland, including 226 bales of flour and 18 bales of wool, lying in the warehouse on Vlieland. The revenue of the wool and flour at Vlieland had a revenue of over 7000 Guilder.

A subsequent sale of wreck items took place on 19 June 1867 on Vlieland, including its 110 hp engine and the salvaged rigging such as sails, ropes, chains, blocks and water barrels.

According to papers in the Terschelling municipal archives much of the cargo was pushed back. In December 1867, 42 bags of flour were found at C.W. Kramer in Urk. The mayor of Vlieland knew the names of people who were illegally in possession of cargo, but did nothing with this information.

== Wreck and salvage ==
=== 20th-century dives ===
After the wreck was rediscovered in the late 20th-century, a diving team from Terschelling dived on the wreck in 1986. They described many details of the ship. The bow was broken and was lying on its side. At the stern, the rudder stock was rising meters above the bottom.

Later, divers from Vlieland salvaged the wreck further. The anchor of the ship was salvaged in 1994 and is located in front of the Vlielander Strandhotel.

=== 2013 salvage ===
From September 2013 the assumed wreck of the SS Millbank was professionally salvaged. Among others the engine of the wreck, were not in the same shape anymore as described after the 20th-century dives. It was assumed, but it could not be assumed with certainty that the recovered ship was the SS Millbank.
