= Admiral (waterman's boat) =

Admiral was a waterman's boat built in the Australian state of Tasmania. It was used to ferry people and goods in and around the town of Hobart on the River Derwent before any bridges were built.

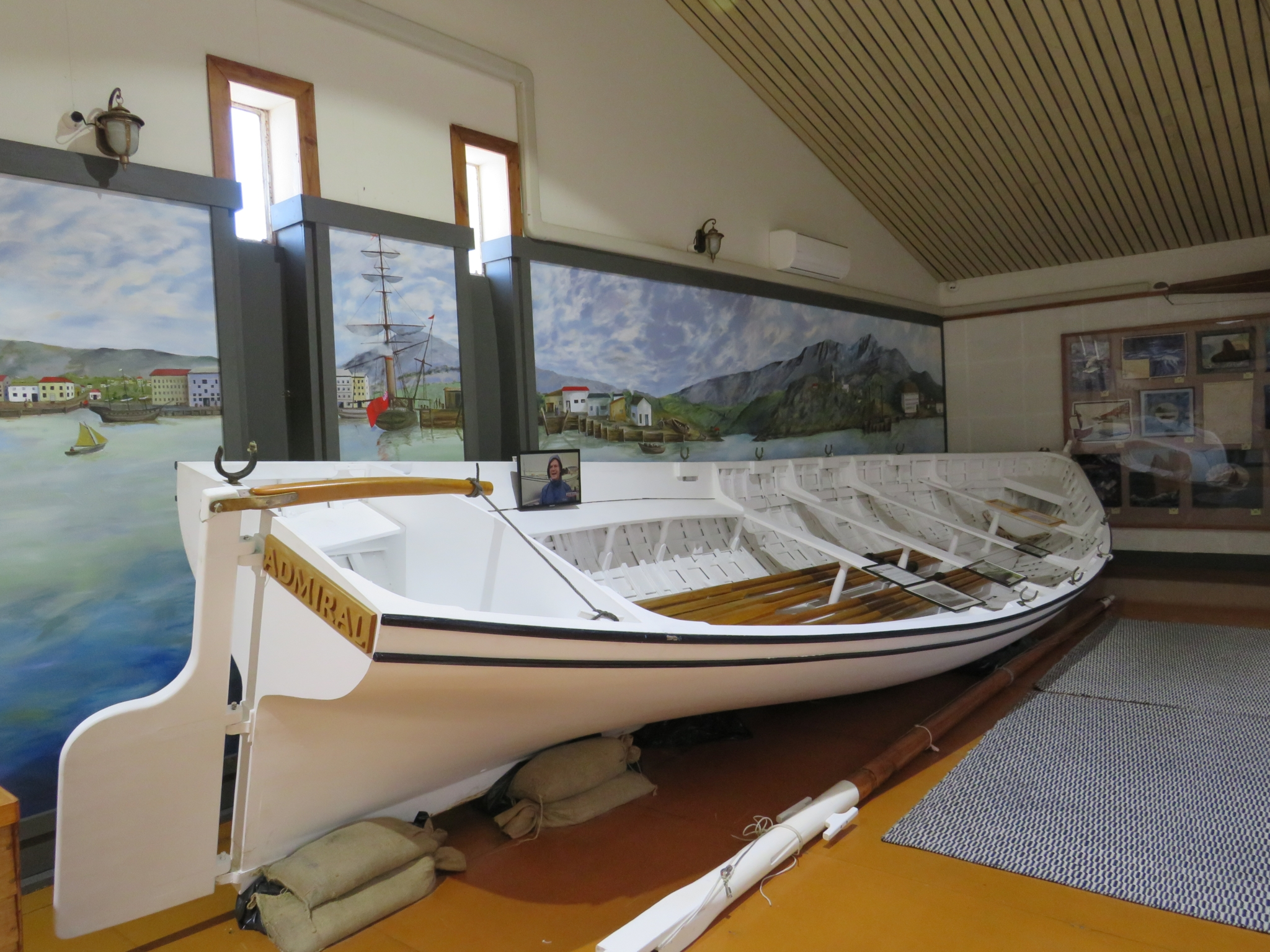

== Construction and early use ==
Admiral was constructed and launched in 1865 by waterman and boat-builder Thomas Morland. It was subsequently sold to waterman Charles Dillon.

The eight-oared boat was 8 and half meters (28 ft) long constructed of carvel-planked Huon pine and a Blue Gum keel.

During its early life, in addition to regular river operations, it also participated in many Hobart Regattas, often carrying dignitaries like Premier of Tasmania Richard Dry and at least three Governors of Tasmania, Thomas Gore Browne, Charles Du Cane and Frederick Weld.

In 1885 Admiral was on a trip ferrying the Mayor and Alderman to a visiting French warship, Maigon'. The sudden rounding of the pier by the steamer Result ended with the Admiral ramming Result at "full-tilt".

In 1888 Admiral's hull was extended by Morland and Dillon and a steam engine was fitted by a Mr Patterson, engineer of Collins St.

== Fishing vessels Myra and Nullia ==
In around 1907 the Admiral was renamed Myra and served as a fishing vessel for the next seventy years. In the early 1970s the boat was renamed Nullia and fitted with a diesel engine, by the late 1970s it was almost demolished after a failed clipper-bow conversion in Kettering. It was rescued from being burned by Allister Martin of the Vintage Boat Club of Tasmania. It was then restored by Bruce Hills and again named Myra. In 1986 it was sold to an owner in Sydney. Information is then sparse about its life until 2006.

== Restoration ==
In 2006 the Admiral was found as a derelict in a boatyard in New South Wales by John and Susan Dikeman.

From its rediscovery until 2009 Admiral was restored to seaworthy operation by a team (whimsically known as the "Admiralty") instigated by Bern Cuthbertson. The boat was disassembled and the original Huon pine planks, nails and rivets saved. The original blue gum keel was rotten and had to be replaced with a new keel made from laminated celerytop pine planks. The planks were cleaned of old paint and tar and the boat reassembled from these with the addition of new sections made with steamed Houn pine.

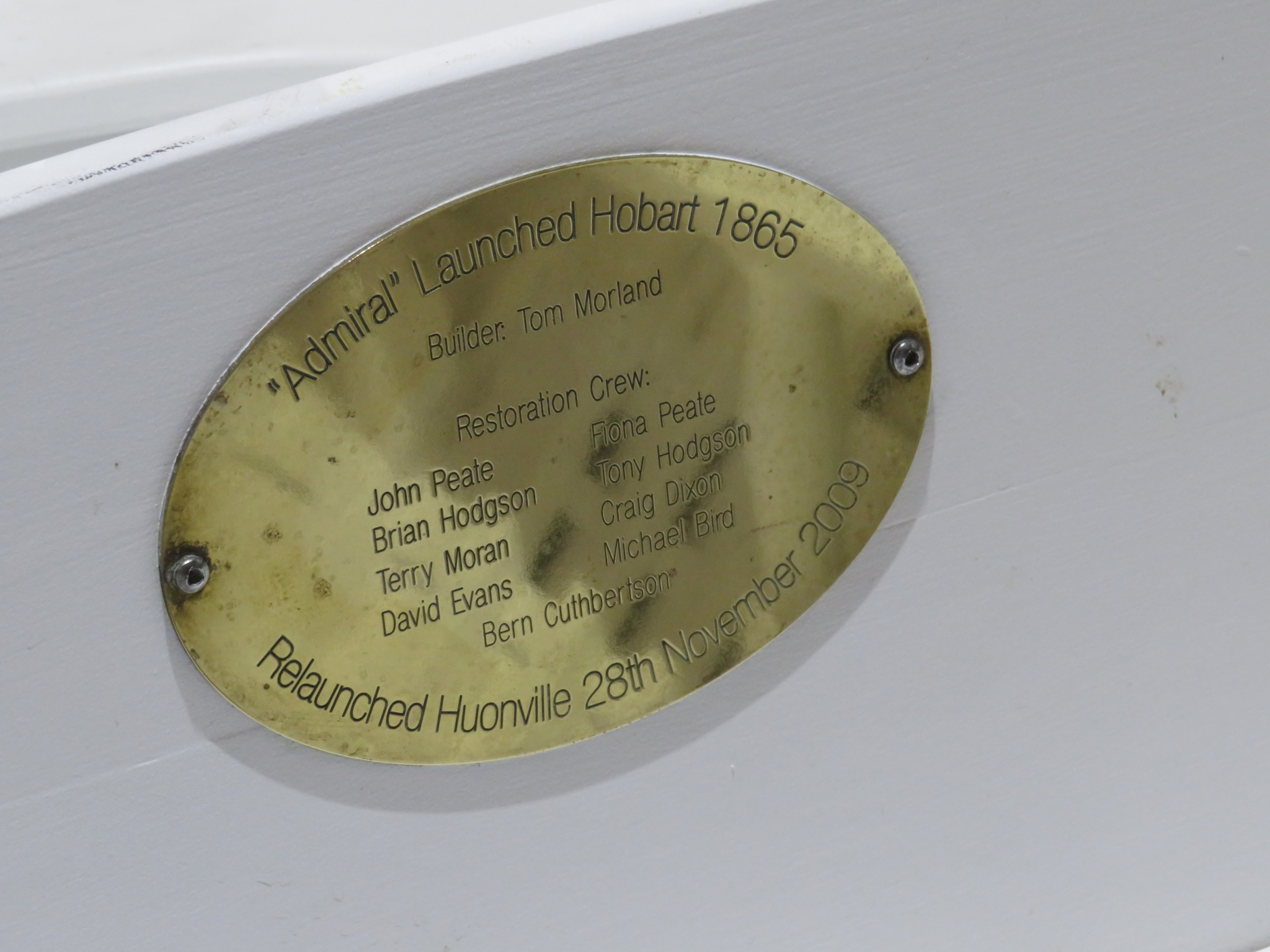
The Admiralty restoration team plaque

== Retirement ==
In 2020, Admiral was retired, and it is on display at the Bass And Flinders Maritime Museum in George Town, Tasmania. Admiral's official welcome to the museum was delayed by COVID-19 precautions and a ceremony was held in 2021.
