= Karand, Kohgiluyeh and Boyer-Ahmad =

Karand كارند
- Village
- Location within Iran
- Coordinates: 30°58′19″N 49°55′16″E
- Country: Iran
- Province: Kohgiluyeh and Boyer-Ahmad
- County: Bahmai
- Bakhsh: Central
- Rural District: Bahmai-ye Garmsiri-ye Jonubi

Population (2006)
  - Total: 66
- Time zone: UTC+3:30 (IRST)
  - Summer (DST): UTC+4:30 (IRDT)

ᾏ

Karand (Persian: كارند, also Romanized as Kārand and Kārend; also known as Kāranj, Kārenj, and Kāvand) is a village in Bahmai-ye Garmsiri-ye Jonubi Rural District, in the Central District of Bahmai County, Kohgiluyeh and Boyer-Ahmad Province, Iran. At the 2006 census, its population was 66, in 13 families.
