= Karanj, Dezful =

Karanj كارنج
- Village
- Location within Iran
- Coordinates: 32°31′45″N 48°51′30″E
- Country: Iran
- Province: Khuzestan
- County: Dezful
- Bakhsh: Sardasht
- Rural District: Sardasht

Population (2006)
  - Total: 114
- Time zone: UTC+3:30 (IRST)
  - Summer (DST): UTC+4:30 (IRDT)

Karanj (Persian: كارنج, also Romanized as Kāranj and Kārenj; also known as Kārbeḩ) is a village in Sardasht Rural District, Sardasht District, Dezful County, Khuzestan Province, Iran. At the 2006 census, its population was 114, in 21 families.
