= SS Karanja (1865) =

Iron-hulled paddle steamer built in 1865

History

United Kingdom
- Name: Karanja or Karanjah
- Owner: Bombay Coast & River Steam Navigation Co
- Operator: Fulcher & Co
- Port of registry: Bombay
- Builder: Henderson, Coulborn & Co, Renfrew
- Yard number: 67
- Launched: June 1865
- Identification: UK official number 30637

General characteristics
- Type: riverboat
- Tonnage: 228 GRT, 166 NRT
- Length: 164.0 ft (50.0 m)
- Beam: 23.2 ft (7.1 m)
- Depth: 7.9 ft (2.4 m)
- Installed power: 90 NHP
- Propulsion: paddles driven by two-cylinder steam engine

SS Karanja or Karanjah was a riverboat built in 1865 by Henderson, Coulborn and Company in Renfrew, Scotland. Her registered length was 164.0 ft (50.0 m), her beam was 23.2 ft (7.1 m), her depth was 7.9 ft (2.4 m), and her tonnages were 228 GRT and 166 NRT. She was a paddle steamer, with a two-cylinder steam engine that was rated at 90 NHP. Her name is variously registered as Karanja or Karanjah.

Karanja served in British India. Her first owner was The Bombay Coast & River Steam Navigation Co Ltd. She was registered in Bombay, and her UK official number is 30637.

== Bibliography ==
- Lloyd's Register of British and Foreign Shipping. London: Lloyd's Register. 1866 – via Internet Archive.
- Mercantile Navy List. London. 1867 – via Crew List Index Project.
