= Cutty Sark (disambiguation) =

The Cutty Sark is a tea clipper ship built in Scotland, now in permanent dry dock at Greenwich, London.

Cutty Sark may also refer to:

- Cutty Sark (whisky), a brand of Scotch whisky
- "Cutty Sark" (short story), a short story by Ivan Yefremov
- Cutty-sark (witch), a character created by Robert Burns in Tam o' Shanter
- Cutty Sark (pub), a pub in Greenwich, London
- Cutty Sark (yacht), a private yacht belong to the Duke of Westminster and used in submarine escort duties during World War II
- Saro Cutty Sark, a British flying boat of the 1920s
- Cutty Sark DLR station, a station on the Docklands Light Railway, near the ship
- "Cutty Sark", a 1962 instrumental single by John Barry

== See also ==
- Cuttie-stool
- Cutty (disambiguation)
- Sark (disambiguation)
