= Cumbers =

Cumbers is a family name. Notable people with the name include:

- Luis Cumbers (born 1988), English footballer
- Simon Cumbers (1968–2004), Irish journalist murdered in Saudi Arabia
- Sydney Cumbers (1875–1959), British collector of merchant navy memorabilia

See also

- Cumbers Reef - Part of the Amiot Islands, named for a British naval officer
