= Lalla Rookh (1856 ship) =

History

United Kingdom of Great Britain and Ireland
- Name: Lalla Rookh
- Owner: William Prowse & Co.
- Builder: Liverpool
- Launched: 1856
- Fate: Wrecked on rocks off Prawle Point, Devon, 3 March 1873

General characteristics
- Type: Tea clipper
- Tons burthen: 869 tons
- Length: 179 feet (55 m)
- Depth of hold: 20 feet (6.1 m)

Lalla Rookh was a square-rigged, iron-hulled tea clipper of 869 tons, built in 1856 in Liverpool, Lancashire, owned by William Prowse & Co. and said to travel fast. She was used for trade with India and China, and was advertised in 1871 as a packet ship to take passengers to Australia. She was completely wrecked at Prawle Point, Devon on 3 March 1873, with the loss of one crew member and all of her cargo of tea and tobacco.

== Description ==
Lalla Rookh was a square-rigged, iron-hulled tea clipper of 869 tons, built in 1856 in Liverpool, Lancashire. She was owned by William Prowse & Co. (Note: At a court case in 1860 about the collision of another of their ships, Peerless, Joshua Prowse, William Prowse jnr, John Prowse, Robert Saunders Prowse, and Peter Colliver were listed as owners.) of Liverpool, although one report cites the owners as Adams and Co. of Liverpool. She was 179 feet (55 m) in length and 33 feet (10 m) in breadth, with a hold 20 feet (6.1 m) deep.

== Use and voyages ==
She was used to transport tea from China to Britain.

Lalla Rookh sailed under the command of masters "Connibe'r" (Colliver?) (1860–61); T. Brown (1865–66); Wilson (1865–66, 1870–71); and Fullerton (1872–73).

On 28 October 1859, the Danish schooner Ida collided with a ship named Lallah Rookh and sank at Liverpool, but was able to be refloated, and all crew were saved. (Note: It is yet to be confirmed that it was this Lalla Rookh involved in the collision, but it seems likely, given the lack of other substantial ships of this name recorded around this time.)

In April 1867 Lallah Rookh sailed from Liverpool to Calcutta under Captain Wilson.

In 1871 she was "re-classed at Lloyd's for a period of twenty-one years".

In December 1871 she was being advertised to carry passengers, as a packet ship, to Melbourne, Adelaide, Geelong, Sydney, Hobart and Launceston under Captain Fullerton. She was described as a Liverpool-built iron clipper of 947 tons register, of the highest class, built "under special survey". She boasted of having made the passage to Bombay in 89 days.

== Wrecking ==
On 3 March 1873 she was wrecked when returning from Shanghai, having left on 22 October 1872, with 1300 tons of tea and 60 tons of tobacco, at Prawle Point, Devon, when she struck a rock at Gammon Head. She was carrying 19 people, including Captain Fullerton, and most managed to jump onto the rocks, while some used a buoy sent out by Prawle coastguards using a rocket. The ship's mate, who was trying to launch the ship's lifeboat, drowned, while the circumstances of the death of a stowaway, who had been ill before the event, were unclear.

The cause of the wreck was described an "utterly inexplicable blunder", when she steered right on Prawle Point. Captain Fullerton was said to be instantly on deck and behaved "with great intrepidity". Unsuccessful attempts were made to launch the lifeboats, but a rocket was fired by coastguards on shore carrying a hawser, which was used to save all of the crew within 30 minutes. An American stowaway, who had been discovered three days after leaving Shanghai and had been very ill during the voyage, apparently died shortly before the ship struck the shore.

Her wreck, which broke up within a couple of weeks, still lies under the sand at Elender Cove. A few weeks after the wrecking, some of the cargo and pieces of wreckage were washed up on Slapton Sands, further up the coast to the north-east, and other small beaches nearby. It was said that tea and tobacco was heaped up to 11 feet (3.4 m) high in places.

A Board of Trade inquiry was held into the sinking of the vessel, in which it was stated that the wreck took place during a dense fog, and, according to the second mate, all that was possible to save the ship was done, although the two lead lines on deck were not used.

The estimated value of the ship was £10,000 and its cargo £50,000, but the total was only insured for £10,000.

== Figurehead ==
The figurehead from her bow remained intact and washed up on the coast of Jersey and was found in 1939, shortly before World War II. It is preserved as part of the Long John Silver Collection at the Cutty Sark (now a museum ship) at Greenwich in London. The figurehead represents Princess Lalla Rookh, a character in Thomas Moore's 1817 romantic poem, Lalla Rookh. This figurehead was in a collection created by British businessman Sydney Cumbers (1875–1959), known as "The Long John Silver Collection". Its complete provenance is unknown.
