= Sark (disambiguation) =

Sark (Sercq) is one of the Channel Islands.

Sark or SARK may also refer to:

== Places ==
- Sark, Razavi Khorasan, a village in Razavi Khorasan Province, Iran
- River Sark, which flows along the west end of the border between England and Scotland

== Arts, entertainment, and media ==
- Julian Sark, a character from the TV series Alias
- Sark (Tron), a character in the Tron franchise
- a species of villainous robots from the TV series Hot Wheels Battle Force 5
- the overseer planet of The Currents of Space by Isaac Asimov

== Military ==
- Battle of Sark, fought between England and Scotland in October 1448, by the River Sark
- SARK (Search And Rescue Knife), made by Emerson Knives, Inc. for the United States Navy
- SS-N-4 Sark, the NATO reporting name for the R-13 submarine-launched ballistic missile

== People ==
- Steve Sarkisian (born 1974), American college football head coach and former player
- Harvey Sark (1907–1964), American football player
- SARK (author), pen name of Susan Kennedy (born 1954), American author and illustrator of self-help books

== Other uses ==
- Tuttle Capital Short Innovation ETF (Nasdaq: SARK), American exchange-traded fund
- Sark means a shirt in some Scottish and Northern English dialects

== See also ==
- Cutty Sark (disambiguation)
- Little Sark, a peninsula on the island of Sark
- Sark-French (or Sercquiais), the Norman dialect of the island of Sark
- Sarking, a term used in roof construction
