= Saro Cutty Sark =

British amphibious aircraft

A17 Cutty Sark
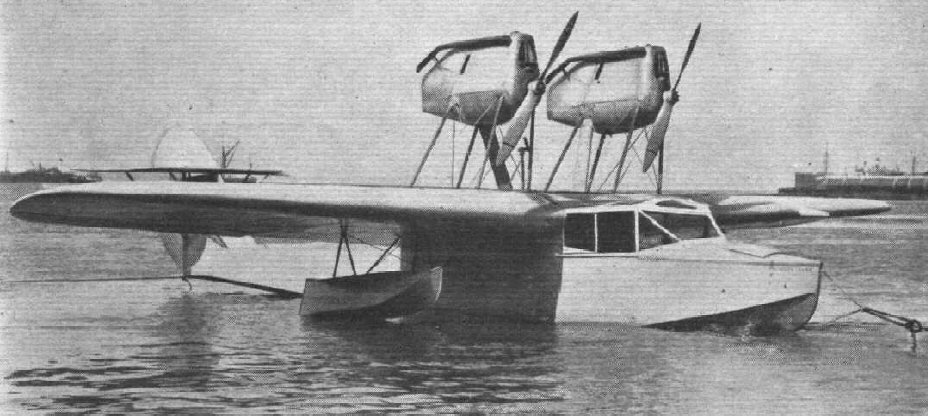

General information
- Type: Amphibian
- Manufacturer: Saunders-Roe
- Number built: 12

History
- Introduction date: 1930
- First flight: 4 July 1929

The Saro A17 Cutty Sark was a British amphibious aircraft from the period between World War I and World War II, built by the British firm Saunders-Roe (also known as SARO). The aircraft was named after the ship Cutty Sark, rather than the garment or the fictional witch.

The Cutty Sark was a shoulder-winged four-seat amphibian monoplane with an all-metal hull and plywood covered wings. The above-wing pylon-mounted engines could easily be changed, and a variety of different engines were used to power the type, including 104 hp Cirrus Hermes Mk 1s and 120 hp de Havilland Gipsy IIs. The Saro A19 Cloud was derived from the Cutty Sark.

Only 12 Cutty Sarks were built, and none lasted long in service, but the type nevertheless saw service with many users in the United Kingdom, Australia, Canada, New Zealand, China, Japan and the Dominican Republic.

== Development ==
In 1928, Sir Alliot Verdon Roe sold Avro. He bought an interest in S. E. Saunders, flying boat manufacturers based at Cowes, Isle of Wight, southern England; the company was renamed Saunders-Roe. The rebranded company's first new project to reach quantity production was the A17 Cutty Sark. It was a four-seat twin-engined commercial flying boat. While primarily intended for landing and taking off from the water, the Cutty Sark could also make occasional use of land-based facilities, for which purpose the manufacturer could supply an amphibian gear that would attach to various fixing points that were present upon on the structure.

In terms of propulsion, the Cutty Sark could be equipped with numerous engine arrangements that would develop a total power output of around 200 hp. Typically, it would be powered by a pair of engines mounted in a tractor configuration within separate nacelles positioned above the wing; this location was readily accessibility while afloat. Seeking to avoid excessive inefficiency and ensure a sufficient safety margin in the event of a forced landing, it was specified that the flying boat's loading ought not to exceed 106 lb. per hp. The engines could be started from the pilot's seated position on the flight deck by means of a compressed air-based ignition system, which comprised a compact engine-drive compressor, a reservoir, fuel vaporizers, distributors and remote controls. The lubrication system was entirely contained within the engine, the sump had a capacity of two gallons while a gauge on the side of the crankcase displayed the quantity of oil present.

Fuel was primarily stored within the wings; the wing tanks supplied fuel to the engines via a pair of gravity tanks, which could contain sufficient fuel for half an hour of flight time, that were located directly behind the engines. The fuel cocks installed upon the gravity tanks could be actuated remotely by the pilot. The gravity tanks were protected by a fireproof baffle. Both the piping and tanks were relatively isolated from most sources of ignition to lower the risk posed by fire, particularly to the hull and the occupants therein; it was for this reason that no fuel pipes were permitted within the hull. Faith in these fire prevention measures were such that smoking was permitted within the cabin. The lubrication system is contained wholly in the engine. A gauge on the side of the crankcase shows the quantity of oil in the sump which has a capacity for two gallons.

The wing of the Cutty Sark was a single fully cantilever unit that was composed entirely of wood, a substantial portion being three-ply. As a result of the method of construction, the wing was water-tight to the extent that it was capable of floating the whole flying boat; furthermore, in the event of a lateral stabilizer failure, the wing tip could perform the same function. These attributed bolstered the flying boat's safety, particularly while on the water. Lateral stability was greatly impacted by the presence of the floats, which were composed of alclad and constructed using similar practices to that of the hull. A special landing gear, comprising a hollow axle build into the hull into which a detachable axle with aluminium wheels could be passed, to facilitate beaching. The deployment of this gear was via levers in the cabin.

The stabilizer, elevators and rudder were of welded steel construction and covered by fabric. The fin differed considerably, being built up from the tail of the hull and composed of duralumin; it had a removable side panel to permit access to the controls. Both the elevator and rudder had balanced flight control surfaces, the former was actuated via a torque shaft that ran through the fin while the latter via cables routed directly into the hull. Adjustment of stabilizer's rate of incidence was achieved via a screw jack that was in turn actuated by cables from a hand wheel operated by the pilot. All of the steelwork was either stainless or cadmium-plated, while every duralumin rivets as well as the aluminum used in the cowling was anodically treated.

The hull was composed of a combination of alclad-protected duralumin and thus was relatively resistant to corrosion. The design of the planing bottom of the flying boat, which had quite low resistance and relatively clean running (the latter was a product of the bow shaping) was heavily influenced by experienced from prior flying boats. A stowage compartment for equipment such as the anchor and other marine gear, complete with a hinged hatch, was located within the bow. The size of the hull permitted ample space for the cabin, which was entirely enclosed and seated up to four personnel. The starboard sliding window, in combination with a transversally sliding section of the roof, was the primary means of access to and from the cabin; the window frame functioned as a step that was within easy reach of a dinghy moored alongside.

The forward screen of the cabin, which was fixed, was composed of triplex glass; it had slidable side panels that permitted the pilot to lean out and look downwards and forwards relatively unobstructed, an attribute that was particularly useful during landing as well as when manoeuvring upon the water. The pilot had excellent external visibility, despite the cabin being entirely enclosed, as a result of the entirety of the front, sides, and roof of the cabin being composed of either glass or cellon. Both the seats and the sides of the cabin were upholstered; the seats were arranged to accommodate a central isle, the floor of which was set lower than that underneath the seats. The pilot was seated on the port side; detachable dual flight controls were available, which permitting a second pilot to be seated in the starboard front seat as well. These flight controls were largely stick-based along with a bar for adjusting the rudder and a centrally mounted throttle control upon the dashboard within easy reach of either pilot. A triangular roof panel above the dashboard gave sufficient space for the pilot to stand up through the opening for the purpose of picking up mooring while remaining at their station to operate the twin throttles and engine switches to manoeuvre the flying boat into position.

To assist manoeuvring on the water, the Cutty Sark incorporated a flap drogue, which consisted of two spring-loaded plates that were hinged on the sides of the hull near to the step and were actuated by the pilot. These functioned as brakes to reduce the taxying speed while on the water which, due to its relatively low resistance hull and the two engines running at speed sufficient to maintain control, would otherwise be far longer. Furthermore, the flap drogue could be used to achieve a degree of steering. All of the flooring and side panels within the hull were detachable so that the inside of the plating could be inspected or repainted. A protective coat of Cerric cellulose lacquer was applied to both the interior and exterior of the hull, as well as to the wing and various other components; all holes in the surface were carefully sealed (often making use of sleeves or glands) aside from the vent holes in the trailing edge of the wing.

== Production aircraft ==
- A17/1 : The prototype G-AAIP was first flown on 4 July 1929. Bought by Captain Campbell Shaw and Flight Lieutenant Tommy Rose for Isle of Man Air Services. Returned to Cowes in 1933 after being damaged by floating timber.
- A17/2 : VH-UNV was exported to Australia by Matthews Aviation flying the Bass Strait between Melbourne and Tasmania from May 1930. On 8 November 1931 the aircraft was driven by wind into a pier at St. Kilda, and Mr E. Lloyd, a passenger who attempted to assist, was killed by a propeller. In 1935 it was sold to Pioneer Air Services. In 1937 it was sold to Keith Caldwell, a young barnstorming pilot from Lindfield NSW (not to be confused with the NZ WWII fighter ace of the same name); on 15 October 1937, at the same time as he joined Qantas as a pilot, Caldwell sold VH-UNV for £700 to the airline as a trainer. It was written off after landing on water with the undercarriage extended on 5 April 1938.
- A17/3 : a.k.a. "L3". Sold to the RNZAF. It was first flown on 3 March 1930, then shipped to New Zealand aboard the SS Mataroa, where it was reassembled by 28 May 1930. It operated from Hobsonville, Auckland, for the next six years. After 221 hours and 5 minutes flying time it was judged worn out beyond economic repair. L3 made its last flight on 23 November 1936, after which it served as an instructional airframe. It was scrapped in 1939.
- A17/4 : G-AAVX before being sold to Singapore as VR-SAA in 1930.
- A17/5 : G-ABBC named "Progress I" operated out of Blackpool to the Isle of Man by British Amphibious Airlines. Attempts to replace it with an A.19 Cloud after 1933 were blocked due to SARO's decision to operate an airline from the Isle of Man.
- A17/6 : Acquired by the Royal Air Force as S1575.
- A17/7 : Sold to Hong Kong as VR-HAY
- A17/8 : Served in the Kwangsi Air Force in China, but was returned to Britain as G-AETI.
- A17/9 : The only single-engine example. Registered G-ABVF and sold to the Japanese aviator Seiji Yoshihara. Aircraft was named Hochi-Nippon for a trans-Pacific flight but it crashed soon after take-off from Oakland, California.
- A17/10 : Registered G-ACDP to Air Service Training Ltd., used by No 3 E & RFTS until 1942. Fitted with radial engines.
- A17/11 : Registered G-ACDR to Air Service Training Ltd., used by No 3 E & RFTS until 1942.
- A17/12 : Registered G-ADAF. This may be the machine exported to the Dominican Republic in 1935, and written off in 1942.

== Operators ==
=== Military operators ===
China

- Kwangsi Air Force

Dominican Republic

- Dominican Air Force - One aircraft.

New Zealand

- Royal New Zealand Air Force

United Kingdom

- Royal Air Force

== Specifications (A.17M – Genet Major engines) ==
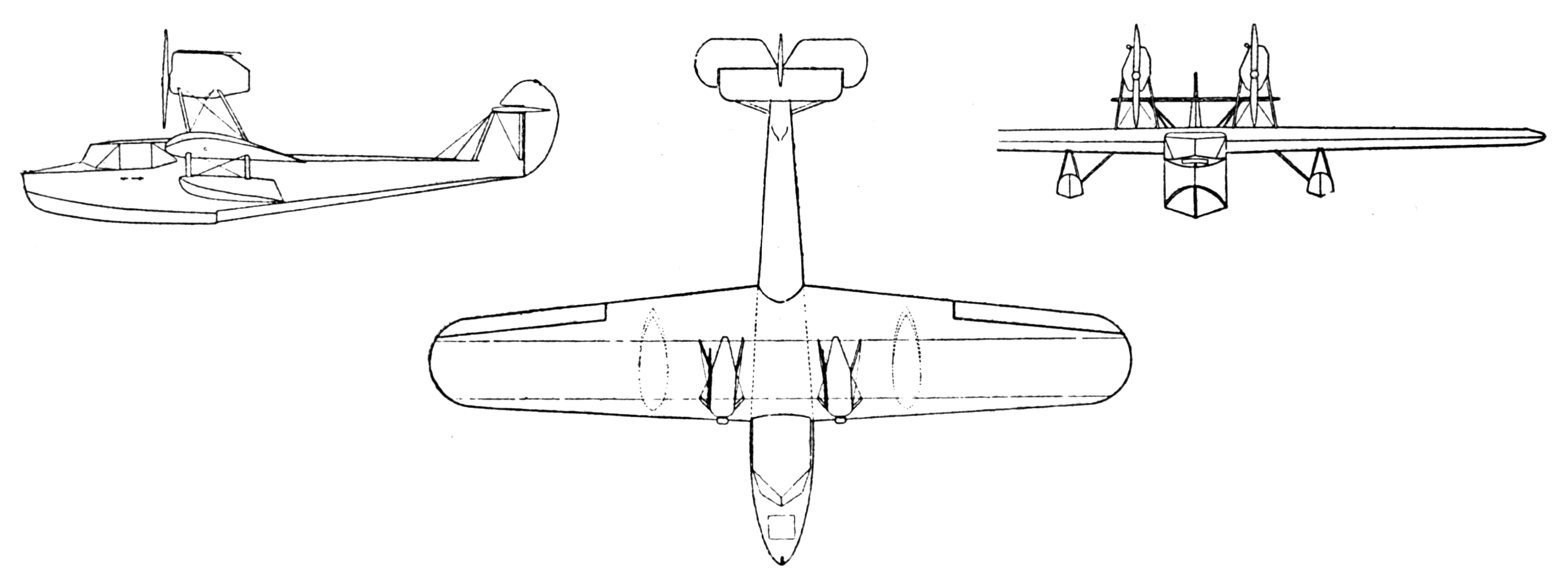
Saunders Roe Cutty Sark 3-view drawing from L'Aéronautique August,1929

Data from British Civil Aircraft 1919–1972: Volume III, Saunders and Saro aircraft since 1917

General characteristics

- Crew: Two
- Capacity: Two passengers or up to 510 lb (231 kg) payload
- Length: 34 ft 4 in (10.46 m)
- Wingspan: 45 ft 0 in (13.72 m)
- Height: 11 ft 2 in (3.40 m)
- Wing area: 320 sq ft (30 m^{2})
- Empty weight: 2,725 lb (1,236 kg)
- Gross weight: 3,865 lb (1,753 kg)
- Fuel capacity: 40 imp gal (48 US gal; 182 L) in two wing tanks
- Powerplant: 2 × Armstrong-Siddeley Genet Major seven-cylinder air-cooled radial piston engines, 140 hp (100 kW) each
- Propellers: 2-bladed wooden fixed-pitch propellers

Performance

- Maximum speed: 107 mph (172 km/h, 93 kn)
- Cruise speed: 93 mph (150 km/h, 81 kn)
- Range: 315 mi (507 km, 274 nmi)
- Service ceiling: 9,000 ft (2,700 m)
- Rate of climb: 500 ft/min (2.5 m/s)

== See also ==
Related lists

- List of aircraft of the Royal Air Force
- List of aircraft of the Royal New Zealand Air Force and Royal New Zealand Navy
- List of aircraft of World War II
- List of flying boats and floatplanes
