= Great Tea Race of 1872 =

Regatta in 1872

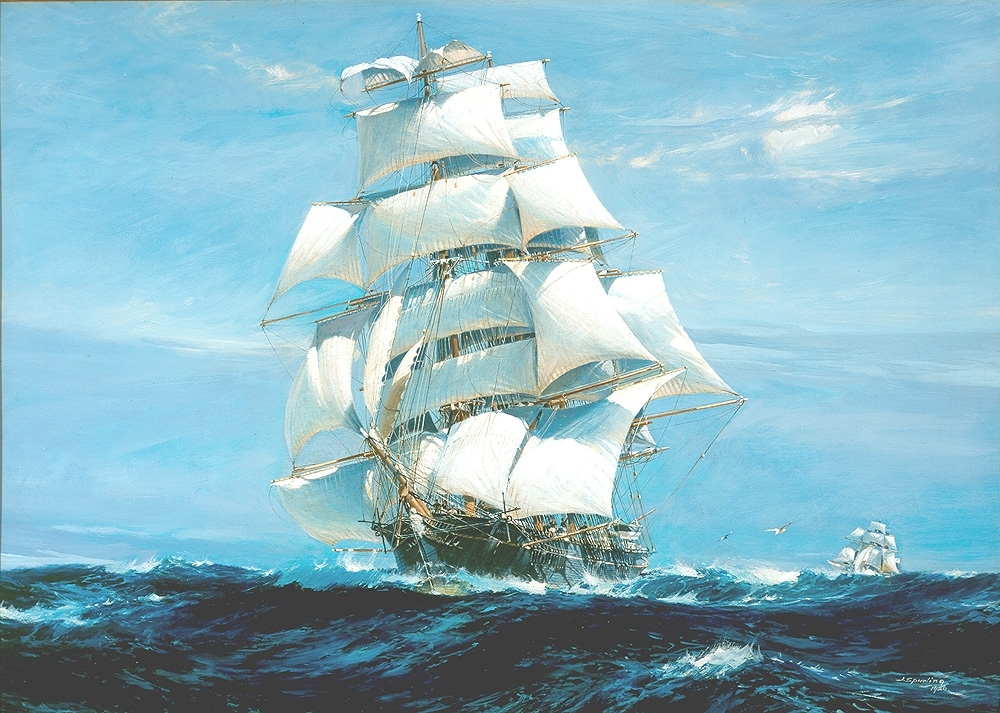
Tea Race 1866, by Jack Spurling

The Great Tea Race of 1872 was a regatta, held in 1872 between two "tea clippers" Cutty Sark and Thermopylae.

== History ==
Clipper ships were small ships used to deliver Tea along the trade route from China to England, which was a relentless speed race at the time.

Tea clipper races were held from 1859 to 1872. The starting point of the ships with the new batch of tea on board began in Shanghai. The clippers finished in London without entering the ports along the way. Every year about a dozen ships participated in them. Quite quickly, a sweepstakes began to develop in Britain, receiving bets on the results of Regatta. In terms of popularity, these sea races overtook the traditional equestrian sport in England. Thanks to high-speed sailboats, people could instantly lose fortunes or get rich.

In 1872, the clipper ship Thermopylae became the main rival of the Cutty Sark in the "tea competition". During the race, the clippers ran parallel on some sections of the track, ahead of each other. In case of victory in the races, captains and teams received a cash prize, and the ship itself received a "Blue Ribbon", pennon on the mast. The Cutty Sark is the last surviving ship in a series of 19th century fast tea clippers.

== Race ==
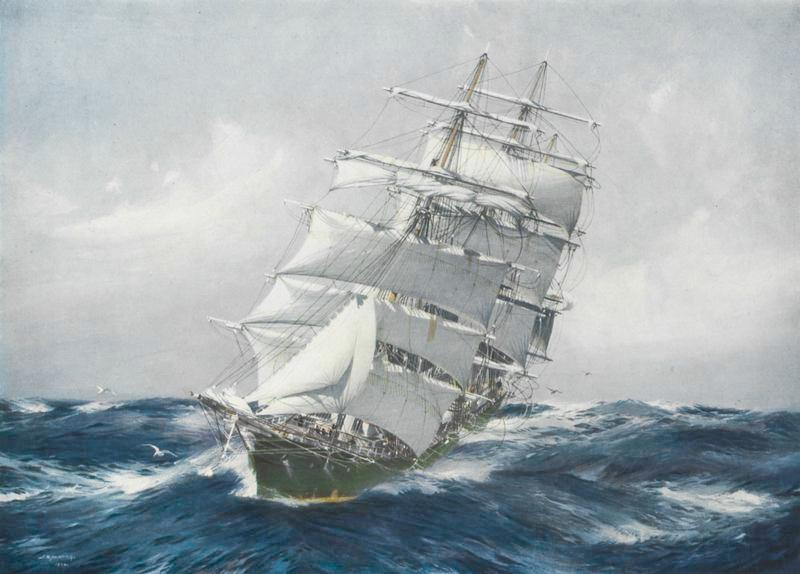
Thermopylae, a tea clipper built in 1868

For a long time, there was rivalry between the two courts in tea races, in which the Thermopylae won more often. The Clippers had a 12958 nautical miles race to London.

The ships left Shanghai on 18 June. Both ships were sailing in the South China Sea on different courses. Then, 28 days after going to sea, the ships met and the race began. Four days after leaving Shanghai, with a light wind, both ships lost their course in a windless zone Indian Ocean, known as the equatorial calm zone. The captains threw coins into the water according to an old Finnish custom, "buying" wind for themselves. On the 39th day, finally, a fresh wind blew. In this weather, with her better performance in heavier winds Cutty Sark took the lead, moving 300 miles a day. After nine weeks of racing, the Cutty Sark was 400 miles ahead of the Thermopylae. While sailing in the Pacific Ocean the clipper suffered a setback: the Cutty Sark lost her rudder during a storm. The ship's crew had to remove sails. Captain Moody was able to keep the ship on course thanks to a special floating anchor. The ship's owner's brother, who was on the crew, suggested that the captain take Cutty to the port of Cape Town for repairs, but the ship's carpenter managed to make a new rudder. The repair of the rudder was completed successfully at sea, despite the gale and big waves. To forge metal on the deck, a temporary forge was made.

During repair work, due to intense pitching, the forge in the forge turned over and the captain's son, who was there, received burns. Thermopylae managed to avoid major damage. They were unaware of the accident aboard the Cutty Sark and arrived in London on 11 October. The Cutty arrived in London a week later than the Thermopylae. The journey from China took the Cutty 122 days. Carpenter Henderson received a bonus of fifty Pound Sterling for his work. This episode in the history of "Cutty Sark" was considered a heroic deed of the whole team – instead of abandoning the race and embarking on repairs, they continued sailing.

== Second stage racing ==
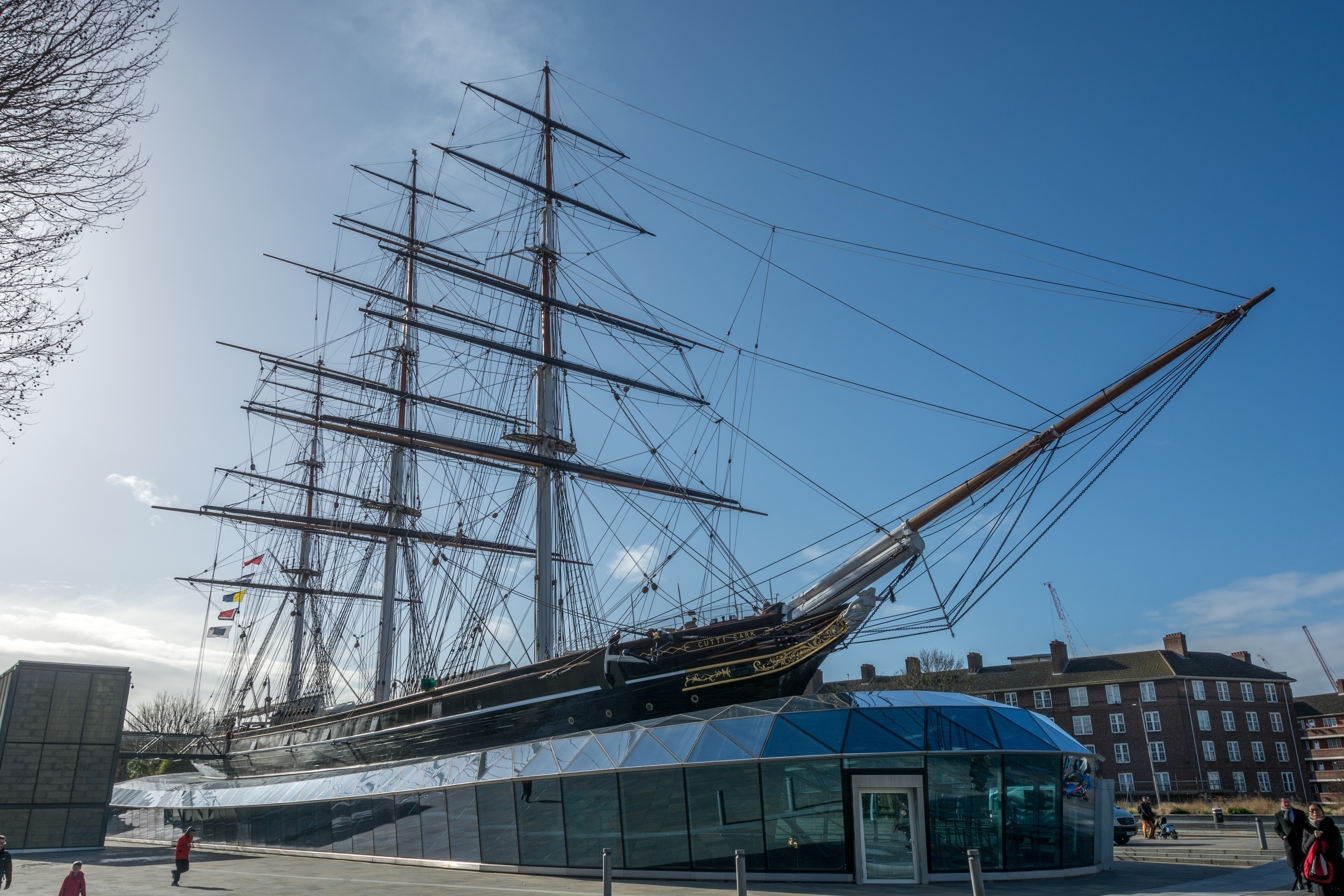
Clipper "Cutty Sark".

After 10 years, the Cutty Sark took revenge, confidently beating its old rival on the way to Australia. Transportation of wool from Australia had become a new stage in the rivalry of these clippers. The route to Australia followed the Cape of Good Hope through the "Roaring Forties".

On October 6, 1885, the Cutty Sark was the first to load wool in Sydney and sail south. Soon the Thermopylae began to overtake her. A race ensued between the two "hounds of the seas". Moving south of New Zealand, the Cutty Sark nearly capsized. The big test for sailing ships was to pass Cape Horn, which the Cutty Sark rounded after 23 days of sailing. The ship headed for London, covering approximately 300 miles a day. As a result, the Cutty Sark set the Sydney-London speed record: 73 days. She arrived one week earlier than Thermopylae.

The race of 1885 was the final in the rivalry between the famous clippers.
