= British Amphibious Airlines =

British airline and seaplane operator

British Amphibious Airlines was a British airline that operated a seaplane service between Blackpool and the Isle of Man in 1932 and 1933.

== History ==
The airline was formed on 4 February 1932 in Blackpool to exploit an agreement to use the sea and foreshore at Blackpool for conducting flight in amphibious flying boats.

During the summer of 1932 the airline operated a service between Blackpool and the Isle of Man using a Saro Cutty Sark named Progress which could carry four passengers. The aircraft was based at Squires Gate Airport but picked up passengers on the foreshore and alighted in Douglas harbour on the Isle of Man, if the sea conditions were bad they used Ronaldsway Airport. Although the first to operate a service to the Isle of Man they were in competition with the Isle of Man Air Services who operated from Liverpool.

The first year they carried 348 passengers on the service, during 1933 the service was only operated on three days a week and carried only 130 passengers. The airline tried to acquire a larger Saro Cloud aircraft but were thwarted by the owners of Saunders-Roe who wanted to run their own service to the Isle of Man so British Amphibious stopped operating the service.

== See also ==
- List of defunct airlines of the United Kingdom
