= Ward Islands =

Group of islands in Antarctica

Ward Islands (67°38′S 69°35′W) is a group of two small islands and off-lying rocks forming the southern part of the Amiot Islands, off the southwest part of Adelaide Island. Named by the United Kingdom Antarctic Place-Names Committee (UK-APC) for Herbert G.V. Ward, chief engineer of RRS John Biscoe, 1948–1962, which ship assisted the Royal Navy Hydrographic Survey Unit which charted this group in 1963.

== See also ==
- List of Antarctic and sub-Antarctic islands
