= Thermopylae (clipper) =

British composite clipper ship built in 1868

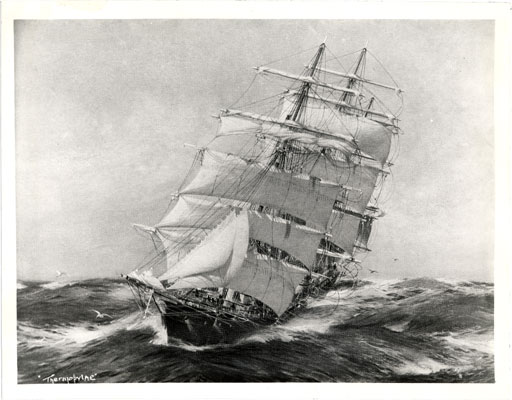
- Thermopylae

History

United Kingdom
- Name: Thermopylae
- Builder: Walter Hood & Co, Aberdeen
- Launched: 1868
- Notes: Design of Bernard Waymouth, London

Kingdom of Portugal
- Name: Pedro Nunes or Pedro Nunez
- Fate: Torpedoed at sea, 13 October 1907, off Cascais

General characteristics
- Class & type: Composite extreme clipper; naval training ship
- Tonnage: 991 GRT; 947 NRT
- Length: 212 ft (64.6 m)
- Beam: 36 ft (11.0 m)
- Depth: 20.9 ft (6.4 m)
- Sail plan: fully rigged ship

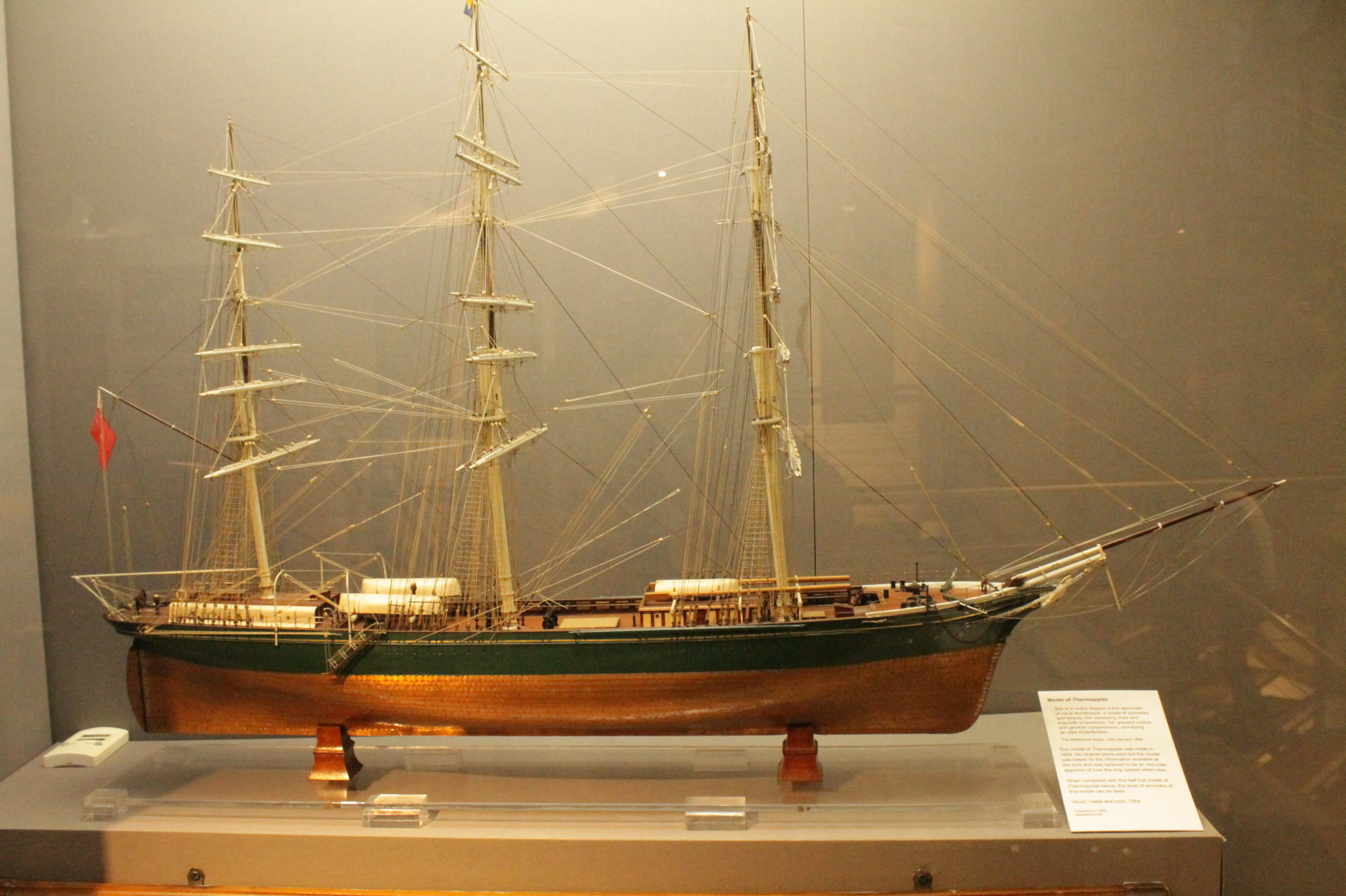
Scale model of Thermopylae, Aberdeen Maritime Museum

Thermopylae was an extreme composite clipper ship built in 1868 by Walter Hood & Co of Aberdeen, to the design of Bernard Waymouth of London. Designed for the China tea trade, she set a speed record on her maiden voyage to Melbourne of 63 days, still the fastest trip under sail.

== Construction ==
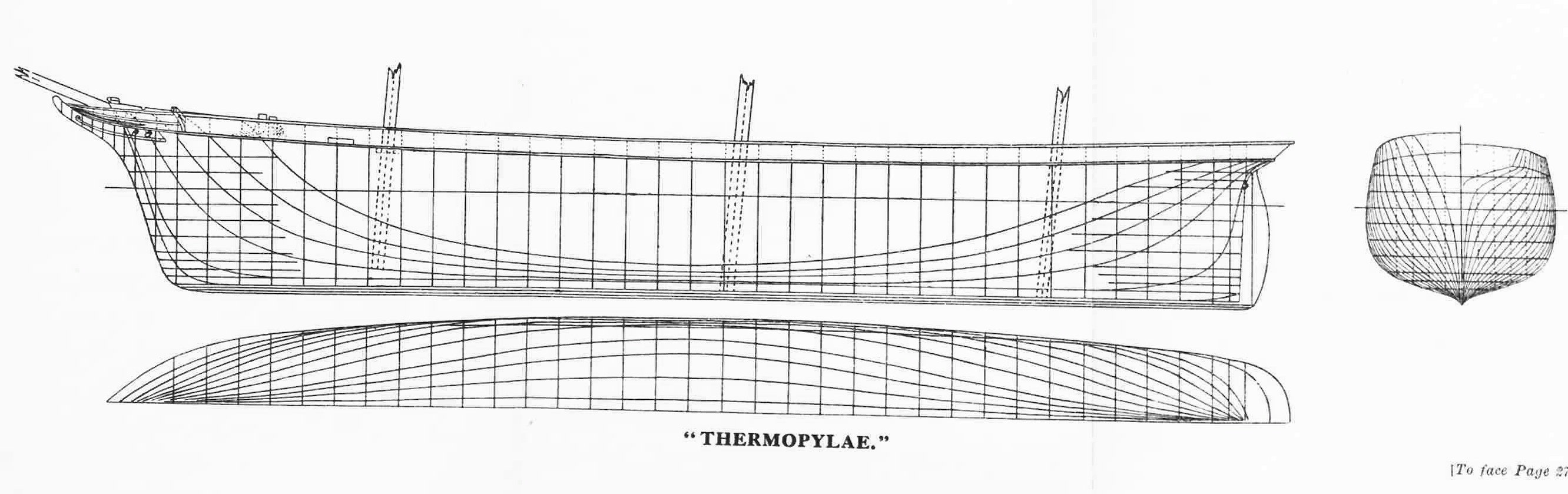
Lines of Thermopylae

Thermopylae was built for the Aberdeen Line, which was founded in 1825 by George Thompson. She measured 212' × 36' × 20.9', with tonnage 991 GRT, 948 NRT and 927 tons under deck. The hull planking was American rock elm from the garboard to the light water line, and then teak from there to the rail. Being of composite construction, the planking was fastened over an iron frame. She had exceptionally fine lines. The coefficient of under deck tonnage was 0.58. This compares with, for instance, Cutty Sark at 0.55 (i.e. slightly sharper than Thermopylae) and Ariel at 0.60. Iron was used for the fore and main lower masts and, when built, the yards for these masts.

== Performance ==
Thermopylae was designed for the China tea trade. Her outbound passage was usually to Australia. On her maiden voyage, starting November 1868, she set a speed record of 63 days from Gravesend to Hobsons Bay, Melbourne, or 60 days measured from the Lizard. On the return trip, leaving Fuzhou on 3 July 1869, she was 89 days to the Lizard, or 91 to London. Her first 10 outward passages to Melbourne averaged 69 days (starting from the Lizard) and her eleven homeward voyages with a cargo of tea averaged 106 and a half days.

Thermopylae was particularly suited to the tea trade, putting in excellent performances in light winds. Although fast on all point of sailing, she was especially quick sailing to windward. Both of these characteristics were important for getting across the China Sea, and it was this section of the homeward passage which was crucial for achieving a fast time back to London.

== Race with Cutty Sark ==
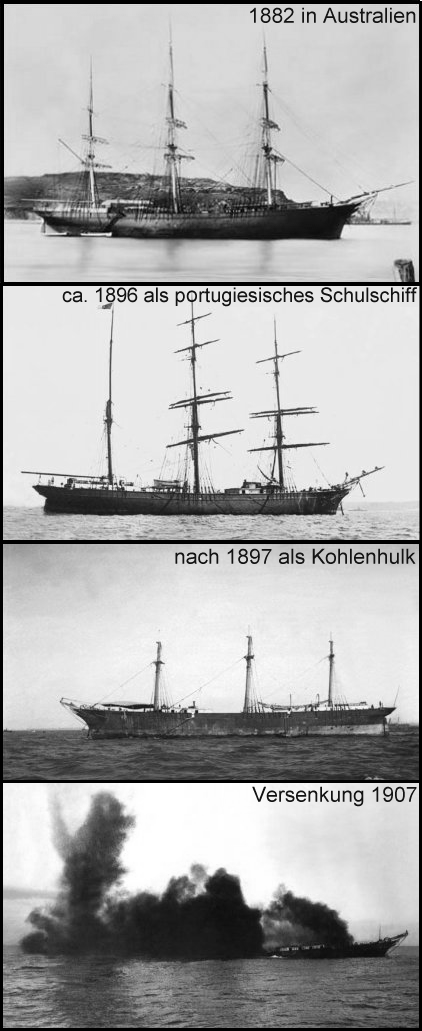
Thermopylae, 1882–1907

In 1872, Thermopylae raced the 1869 clipper Cutty Sark from Shanghai back to London, taking 115 days and winning by seven days after Cutty Sark lost her rudder. Her record day's run was 380 statute miles, a feat exceeded by no sailing ship before.

From 1879, with steam displacing sail from the China tea trade, she sailed to Sydney as her Australian terminal and entered the Australian wool trade homewards, with just one final tea run in 1881. From 1882 onwards, Thermopylae only took part in the Australian wool trade; on this route Cutty Sark proved faster however, as Thermopylae no longer had the advantage of her light wind performance.

After her last tea passage, she carried wool home from Sydney until in 1890 she was sold to Canadian owners and used in the timber trade. At this stage her rig was reduced to barque, with some further reductions in the height of her fore and main masts; she had already seen the height of some of her masts reduced during her time in the wool trade. In 1892 she served on routes across the Pacific Ocean from Canada, before arriving in Leith for the last time on 17 December 1895 where she was sold to the Portuguese government.

== Portuguese naval ship ==
Renamed Pedro Nunes for intended use as a naval training ship, she arrived at the Tagus River in Portugal on 29 May 1896, and was commissioned into the Portuguese Navy on 20 August. The conversion to a training ship did not occur however, and she was soon reduced to a coal hulk. On 13 October 1907, she was towed out to the mouth of the Tagus at a Portuguese Navy League regatta attended by the Queen of Portugal, and sunk by Whitehead torpedoes.
