= Amiot Islands =

- Location within Antarctica

Geography
- Location: Antarctica
- Coordinates: 67°36′S 69°38′W

Administration
- Administered under the Antarctic Treaty System

Demographics
- Population: Uninhabited

The Amiot Islands are two groups of islands and rocks, the Ward Islands and Cumbers Reef, respectively, lying 17 kilometres (9 nmi) west of Cape Adriasola, Adelaide Island, Antarctica. They were discovered by the French Antarctic Expedition, 1908–10, and were named by Jean-Baptiste Charcot for A. Amiot, engineering director of the French Montevideo Co., Montevideo, Uruguay, which made repairs on the ship Pourquoi-Pas. The islands were more accurately charted by the British Royal Navy Hydrographic Survey Unit in 1963.

== See also ==
- List of Antarctic and sub-Antarctic islands
