= SARK (author) =

American author and illustrator

Susan Ariel Rainbow Kennedy (born 1954), known by her pen name SARK, is an American author and illustrator of self-help books. Five of her sixteen books have been national bestsellers, and she has sold more than two million copies of her books.

She was born Susan Kennedy. At age ten, she became friends with an 80-year-old neighbor, Mr. Boggs. When Mr. Boggs went to the hospital with a serious illness, he credited young Susan for helping him recover with the homemade cards and letters she sent every day for a month. No one else, he said, had visited or called during his illness. The experience inspired Kennedy to spend her life in some similar work.

== Professional life ==
In 1982, at age 28, Kennedy moved to San Francisco with $30. She had "opted out of the money system" two years earlier. She earned enough money from her artwork to buy a 180-square-foot (17 m^{2}) building, the home and work space which she called her "magic cottage.' In 1989 she created a poster, How to be an Artist. In an interview SARK said, “The only reason why my poster ‘How to Be an Artist’ ever became known and went on to sell two-and-a-half million copies was because of my cat, Jupiter, who would get up on his tiny legs and peel this poster off the wall. It would land on the floor and wake me up in the morning. For five days this went on, and finally I said, ‘Well, maybe I’m supposed to do something with this thing.’” She then offered it for sale in the catalog of a local metaphysical store. The poster quickly became popular, selling more than 1000 copies within a week. The sudden popularity created a difficulty for Kennedy, because the posters were produced by hand and she lacked facilities for mass production. She completed the posters by devising a system for producing them, and using space in a garage without permission, hiding the posters under a tarp when she heard the owners approaching. The poster's success led a publishing company to contact Kennedy, who soon published her first book, A Creative Companion, which she wrote in two weeks.

In 1993, SARK created Camp SARK, LLC, a company which created products inspired by her artwork. The company's sales were strong, but it failed to return on investments, and SARK relaunched it as Planet SARK in 2003, focusing the company on publishing, events, and online commerce. The new company was more successful than its predecessor.

== Books ==
- A Creative Companion: How to Free Your Creative Spirit. Berkeley, California: Celestial Arts. 1991. ISBN 0-89087-651-7.
- Inspiration Sandwich: Stories to Inspire Our Creative Freedom. Berkeley, California: Celestial Arts. 1992. ISBN 0-89087-678-9.
- Living Juicy: Daily Morsels for Your Creative Soul. Berkeley, California: Celestial Arts. 1994. ISBN 0-89087-703-3.
- Succulent Wild Woman: Dancing with Your Wonder-full Self!. New York: Fireside Books. 1997. ISBN 0-684-83376-X.
- The Bodacious Book of Succulence: Daring to Live Your Succulent Wild Life. New York: Fireside Books. 1998. ISBN 0-684-83377-8.
- Change Your Life without Getting out of Bed: The Ultimate Nap Book. New York: Simon & Schuster. 1999. ISBN 0-684-85930-0.
- Transformation Soup: Healing for the Splendidly Imperfect. New York: Simon & Schuster. 2000. ISBN 0-684-85976-9.
- Eat Mangoes Naked: Finding Pleasure Everywhere and Dancing with the Pits!. New York: Fireside Books. 2001. ISBN 0-684-85977-7.
- Prosperity Pie: How to Relax About Money and Everything Else. New York: Fireside Books. 2002. ISBN 0-7432-2920-7.
- Make Your Creative Dreams Real: A Plan for Procrastinators, Perfectionists, Busy People, Avoiders, and People Who Would Really Rather Sleep All Day. New York: Simon & Schuster. 2004. ISBN 0-7432-2921-5.
- SARK's New Creative Companion: Ways To Free Your Creative Spirit. Berkeley, Calif: Celestial Arts. 2005. ISBN 1-58761-234-8.
- Fabulous Friendship Festival: Loving Wildly, Learning Deeply, Living Fully with Our Friends. New York: Three Rivers Press. 2007. ISBN 978-0-307-34169-3.
- Juicy Pens, Thirsty Paper: Gifting the World with Your Words and Stories, and Creating the Time and Energy to Actually Do It. New York: Three Rivers Press. 2008. ISBN 978-0-307-34170-9.
- Glad No Matter What: Transforming Loss and Change into Gift and Opportunity. Novato, California: New World Library. 2010. ISBN 978-1-57731-935-1.
