= Cumbers Reef =

Cumbers Reef (67°35′S 69°40′W) is a group of rocks aligned in an arc forming the north and west parts of the Amiot Islands, off the southwest part of Adelaide Island. It was named by the UK Antarctic Place-Names Committee for Roger N. Cumbers, 3rd officer of RRS John Biscoe, 1961–62, the ship which assisted the Royal Navy Hydrographic Survey Unit in the charting of this area in 1963.
