= Sydney Cumbers =

British naval memorabilia collector

- Sydney Cumbers in 1951
- Born: 27 October 1875; Hackney, London
- Died: 10 September 1959 (aged 83); Paddington, London
- Other name: Long John Silver
- Occupation: Businessman
- Known for: His large collection of naval memorabilia

Sydney "Long John Silver" Cumbers (27 October 1875 – 10 September 1959) was a British businessman and collector of Merchant Navy memorabilia. He was noted for his large collection of ships' figureheads that he maintained at his house in Gravesend, and which he later donated to the Cutty Sark museum.

== Biography ==
Cumbers was born in 1875 in Hackney, London, to Charles and Matilda Cumbers. He lost the use of an eye in an accident at age 12, after which he took to wearing an eyepatch and was subsequently nicknamed "Long John Silver". Cumbers worked in the family-run printing firm of "Johnstone, Cumbers and Sons" and by April 1905 had become a partner in the company. Cumbers was highly interested in the Merchant Navy, having been denied a life at sea by the loss of his eye, and began collecting memorabilia related to it.

Though his main residence was in London, Cumbers acquired a second home at the coastal town of Gravesend in Kent. He began using the house to display his collection of nautical memorabilia and renamed it "The Lookout". The nautical theme extended to the rooms of his house which he named after parts of a ship such as "Quarter Deck", "Foc's'le", "Half Deck", "Bridge" and "Hurricane Deck" and to his wife, whom he referred to as "The Mate". Cumbers, his house and collection featured in a British Pathé film made in 1951.

Cumbers died in 1959.

== Figurehead collection ==
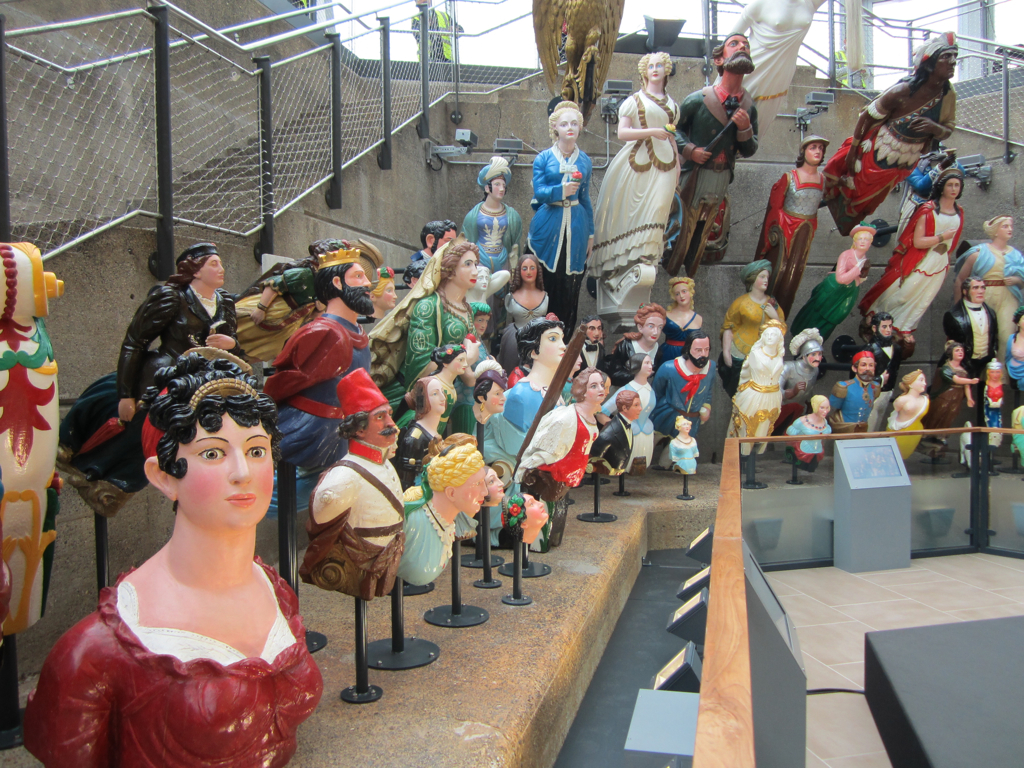
Part of the collection displayed in the new gallery at the Cutty Sark

Cumbers' collection included more than 80 ships' figureheads, in addition to a number of individual body parts such as heads and arms. The Cumbers collection is the largest holding of historic figureheads in the world and includes some that date back more than 200 years and are up to 10 feet (3.0 m) tall. There are numerous depictions of historic characters in the collection including Benjamin Disraeli, William Gladstone, General Havelock, Pitt the Younger, General Gordon, Florence Nightingale, Hiawatha, Lalla Rookh (from the 1856 tea clipper Lallah Rookh ), Diana, Sir Lancelot, Elizabeth Fry, William Wilberforce and Garibaldi.

The lease on "The Lookout" ran out in 1953 and Cumbers took the opportunity to donate the figureheads to the Cutty Sark Preservation Society in memory of British merchant seamen and the little ships of Dunkirk. The museum lacked the space to display the entire collection, showing only 60 at a time with others remaining in storage or being loaned to other institutions. This situation was rectified when the large gallery space beneath the Cutty Sark opened on 26 April 2012 and the entire collection was shown for the first time.
