= Cutty Sark =

British clipper ship, on display at Greenwich, England

Coordinates: 51°28′58″N 0°00′35″W

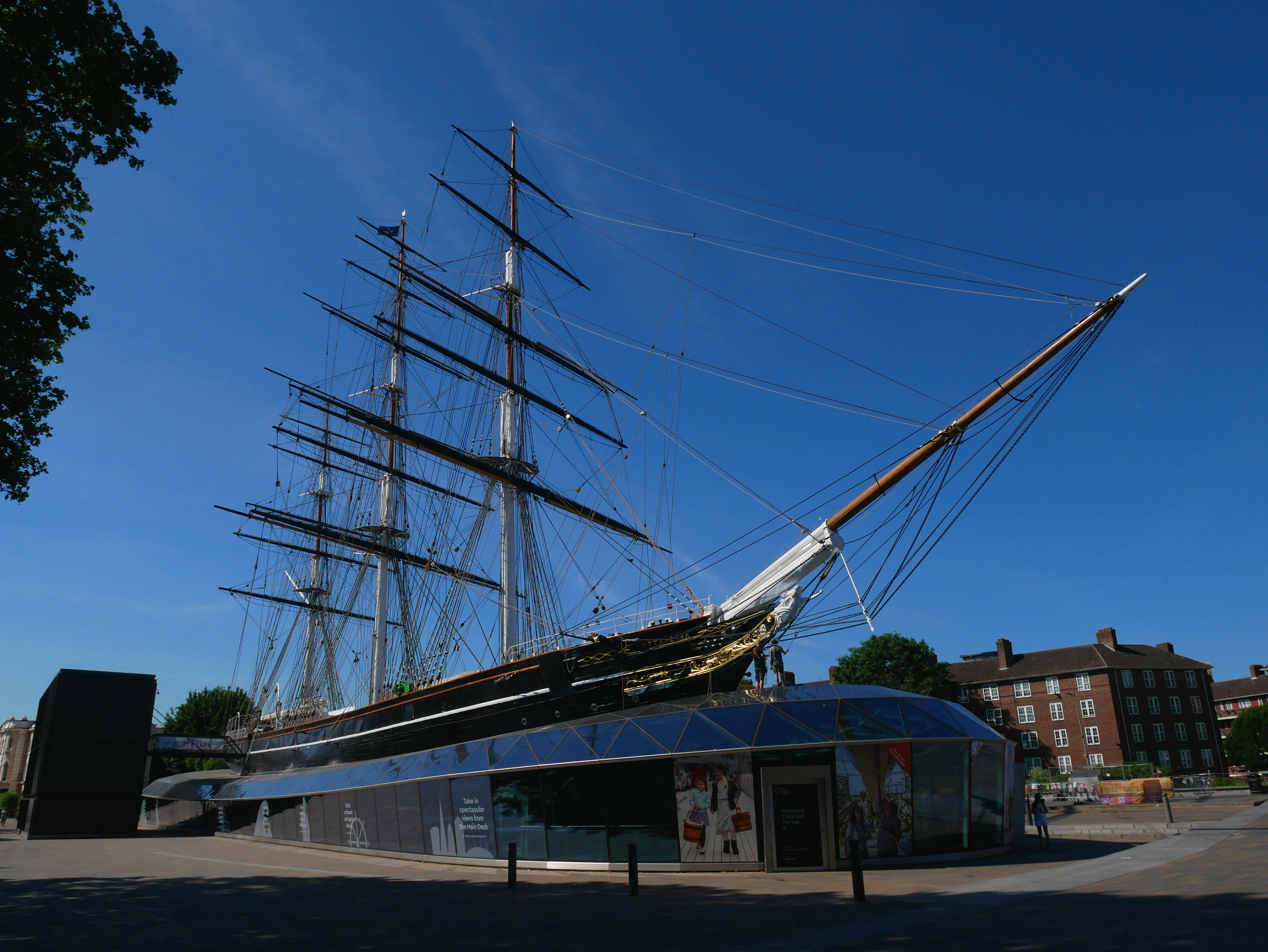
- Cutty Sark on display at Greenwich

History

United Kingdom
- Name: Cutty Sark (1869–1895)
- Namesake: Cutty-sark
- Owner: John "Jock" Willis (1869–1895)
- Ordered: 1 February 1869
- Builder: Scott & Linton; William Denny and Brothers
- Cost: £16,150
- Laid down: 1869
- Launched: 22 November 1869
- Sponsored by: Mrs. George Moodie
- In service: 16 February 1870
- Home port: London
- Identification: UK Official Number: 63557
- Motto: "When there's a will is a way"
- Fate: Sold 1895

Portugal
- Name: Ferreira
- Namesake: Joaquim Antunes Ferreira
- Owner: Joaquim Antunes Ferreira & Co. (1895–1922)
- Acquired: 22 July 1895
- Home port: Lisbon, Portugal
- Nickname(s): Pequena Camisola ("Little shirt")
- Fate: Sold 1922

Portugal
- Name: Maria do Amparo
- Namesake: Mary, Refuge of Sinners
- Owner: Companhia Nacional de Navegação
- Acquired: 1922
- Home port: Lisbon, Portugal
- Fate: Sold 1922

United Kingdom
- Name: Cutty Sark
- Owner: Wilfred Dowman
- Acquired: 1922
- Home port: Falmouth, Cornwall
- Fate: Sold 1938

United Kingdom
- Name: Cutty Sark
- Owner: Thames Nautical Training College
- Acquired: 1938
- Home port: Greenhithe, Kent
- Fate: Sold 1953

United Kingdom
- Name: Cutty Sark
- Owner: Cutty Sark Preservation Society
- Acquired: 1953
- Out of service: Became museum December 1954
- Status: Museum ship

General characteristics
- Class & type: Clipper
- Tonnage: 963 GRT; 921 NRT
- Displacement: 2,100 tons (2,133.7 tonnes) at 20 ft (6.1 m) draught
- Length: Hull: 212.5 ft (64.77 m); LOA: 280 ft (85.34 m)
- Beam: 36 ft (10.97 m)
- Depth of hold: 21 ft (6.40 m)
- Propulsion: 32,000 ft^{2} (3,000 m^{2}) sail (3,000 hp)
- Sail plan: 1870: ship rig; 1916: barquentine rig
- Speed: 17.5 knots (32.4 km/h) maximum achieved
- Complement: 28–35

Cutty Sark is a British clipper ship. Built on the River Leven, Dumbarton, Scotland in 1869 for the Jock Willis Shipping Line, she was one of the last tea clippers to be built and one of the fastest, at the end of a long period of design development for this type of vessel, which ended as steamships took over their routes. She was named after the fictional witch who wore only a short shift (a "cutty sark" in the Scots language) in Robert Burns's poem Tam o' Shanter, first published in 1791. The witch Cutty Sark ran after Tam o' Shanter, who was fleeing on his horse, and caught the horse's tail at the Brig o' Doon. The name was an association between the speed of the fictional witch and that of the clipper ship.

After the big improvement in the fuel efficiency of steamships in 1866, the opening of the Suez Canal in 1869 gave them a shorter route to China, so Cutty Sark spent only a few years on the tea trade before turning to the trade in wool from Australia. Continuing improvements in steam technology early in the 1880s meant that steamships also came to dominate the longer sailing route to Australia, and the ship was sold to the Portuguese company Ferreira and Co. in 1895. She was renamed Ferreira. She continued as a cargo ship until purchased in 1922 by retired sea captain Wilfred Dowman, who used her as a training ship operating from Falmouth, Cornwall. After his death, Cutty Sark was transferred to the Thames Nautical Training College, Greenhithe, in 1938 where she became an auxiliary cadet training ship alongside HMS Worcester. By 1954, she had ceased to be useful as a cadet ship and was transferred to permanent dry dock at Greenwich, London, for public display.

Cutty Sark is listed by National Historic Ships as part of the National Historic Fleet (the nautical equivalent of a Grade I listed building). She is one of only three remaining intact composite construction (wooden hull on an iron frame) ships from the nineteenth century, the others being the clipper City of Adelaide, now in Port Adelaide, South Australia, and the warship HMS Gannet in Chatham. The beached skeleton of Ambassador, of 1869 lying near Punta Arenas, Chile, is the only other significant remnant of this construction method.

The ship has been damaged by fire twice in recent years, first on 21 May 2007 while undergoing conservation. She was restored and was reopened to the public on 25 April 2012. Funders for the Cutty Sark conservation project include: the Heritage Lottery Fund, the House of Commons Digital, Culture, Media and Sport Committee, Sammy Ofer Foundation, Greenwich Council, Greater London Authority, The Stavros Niarchos Foundation, Berry Brothers & Rudd, Michael Edwards and Alisher Usmanov.

On 19 October 2014 she was damaged in a smaller fire.

Cutty Sark whisky derives its name from the ship. An image of the clipper appears on the label, and the maker formerly sponsored the Cutty Sark Tall Ships Race. The ship also inspired the name of the Saunders Roe Cutty Sark flying boat.

== Construction ==
Cutty Sark photographed at sea by Captain Woodget using a camera balanced on two of the ship's boats lashed together

Cutty Sark was ordered by ship-owner John Willis, who operated a shipping company founded by his father. The company had several ships in the tea trade from China to Britain. Speed was an advantage to vessels carrying a high-value, seasonal product, such as tea. Faster ships could obtain higher rates of freight (the price paid to transport the cargo), and tea merchants would use the names of fast-sailing ships that had carried their products in their advertising. Cutty Sark was ordered during a boom in building tea clippers in the period 1865–1869—something that was attributed to a substantial reduction in the import duties for tea. In 1868 the brand-new Aberdeen-built clipper, Thermopylae, set a record time of 61 days port to port on her maiden voyage from London to Melbourne and it was this design that Willis set out to better.

It is uncertain how the hull shape for Cutty Sark was chosen. Willis chose Hercules Linton to design and build the ship but Willis already possessed another ship, The Tweed, which he considered to have exceptional performance. The Tweed (originally Punjaub) was a frigate designed by Oliver Lang based on the lines of an old French frigate, built in Bombay for the East India Company as a combination sail/paddle steamer. She and a sister ship were purchased by Willis, who promptly sold the second ship plus engines from The Tweed for more than he paid for both. The Tweed was then lengthened and operated as a fast sailing vessel, but was considered too big for the tea runs. Willis also commissioned two all-iron clippers with designs based upon The Tweed, Hallowe'en and Blackadder. Linton was taken to view The Tweed in dry dock.

Willis considered that The Tweed's bow shape was responsible for her notable performance, and this form seems to have been adopted for Cutty Sark. Linton, however, felt that the stern was too barrel shaped and so gave Cutty Sark a squarer stern with less tumblehome. The broader stern increased the buoyancy of the ship's stern, making it lift more in heavy seas so it was less likely that waves would break over the stern, and over the helmsman at the wheel. Cutty Sark was given masts that followed the design of The Tweed, with similar good rake and the foremast on both placed further aft than usual.

A contract for Cutty Sark's construction was signed on 1 February 1869 with the firm of Scott & Linton, which had only been formed in May 1868. Their shipyard was at Dumbarton on the River Leven on a site previously occupied by shipbuilders William Denny & Brothers. The contract required the ship to be completed within six months at a contracted price of £17 per ton and maximum size of 950 tons. This was a highly competitive price for an experimental, state-of-the-art vessel, and for a customer requiring the highest standards. Payment would be made in seven instalments as the ship progressed, but with a penalty of £5 for every day the ship was late. The ship was to be built to Lloyd's A1 standard and her construction was supervised on behalf of Willis by Captain George Moodie, who would command her when completed. Construction delays occurred when the Lloyd's inspectors required additional strengthening in the ship.

Work on the ship was suspended when Scott and Linton ran out of money to continue. Rather than simply liquidate the company, an arrangement was made for Denny's to take over the contract and complete the ship, which was finally launched on 22 November 1869 by Captain Moodie's wife. The ship was moved to Denny's yard to have her masts fitted, and then on 20 December towed downriver to Greenock to have her running rigging installed. In the event, completing the ship meant the company's creditors were owed even more money than when work had first been halted.

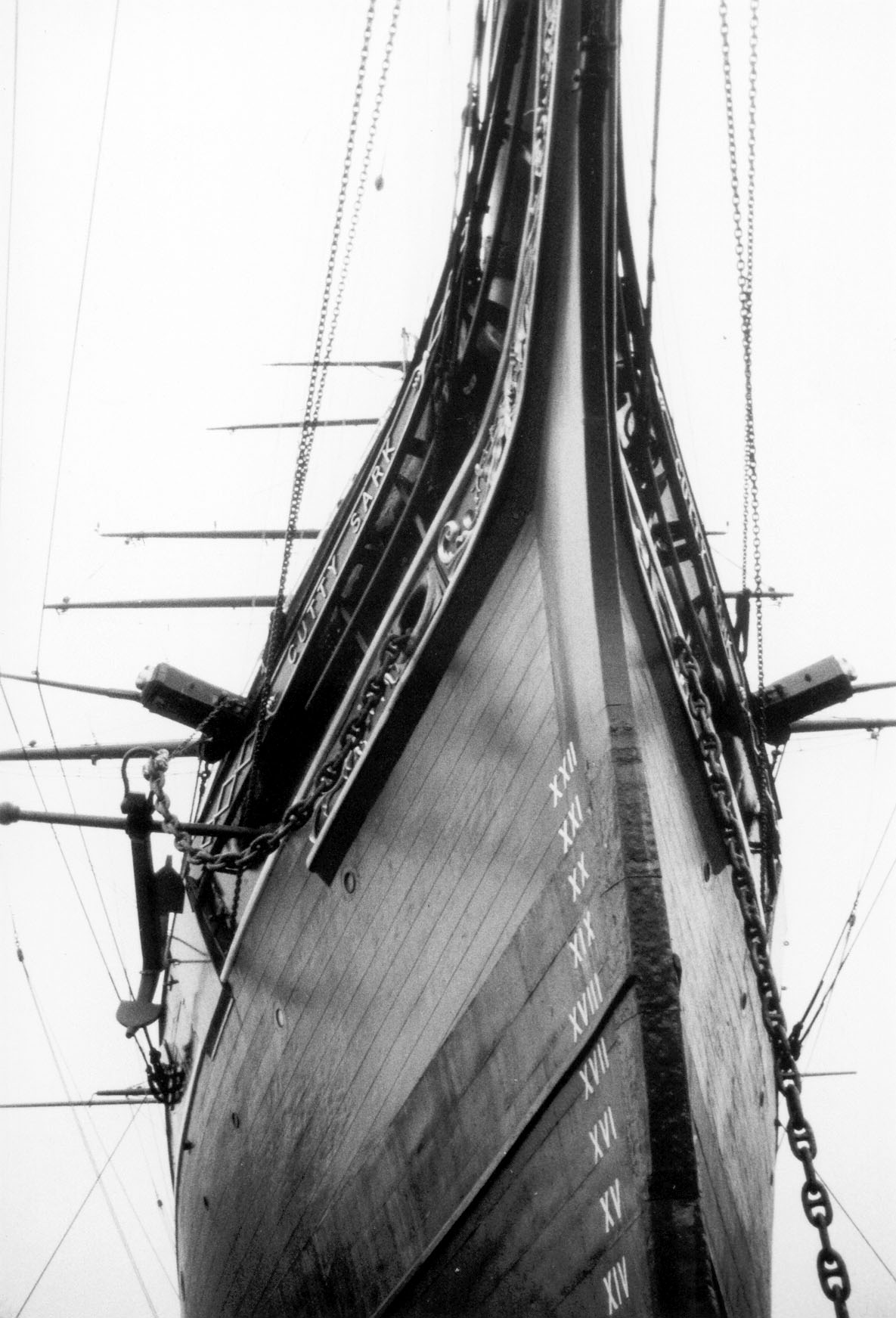
Fine lines of the bow

Cutty Sark has a registered length of 212.5 feet (64.77 m), with a depth of hold of 21 feet (6.40 m) and a net tonnage of 921. The hull is one of the sharpest of all the tea clippers: she has a coefficient of under deck tonnage (Note: The coefficient of under deck tonnage is a method of estimating the "sharpness" of a hull design when all the necessary dimensions of the ships being compared are not available. Sharpness is the amount by which a hull differs from a rectangular block of the same length, breadth and depth: the more material that has to be cut away from that notional block, the sharper the hull. For the coefficient of under deck tonnage, the block coefficient and the prismatic coefficient, the lower the number, the sharper the hull.) of 0.55, compared to Thermopylae at 0.58. Cutty Sark's prismatic coefficient, another measure of hull sharpness, is 0.628; this allows comparison with US-built clippers studied by Howard I. Chapelle. (Note: The prismatic coefficient for clippers studied by Chapelle can be seen in his book The Search for Speed Under Sail. The prismatic coefficient for some of the more famous US-built ships are: Challenge (1851): 0.60, the most extreme clipper by builder William H. Webb; Witch of the Wave (1851): 0.66, an ordinary clipper but with speed records from China to London; Lightning (1854): 0.61, an extreme clipper built by Donald McKay—an example of the larger-sized US-built clippers.; It is probable that few, if any, merchant sailing vessels had a prismatic coefficient of less than 0.57.) (Note: An alternative prismatic coefficient calculation for Cutty Sark is given as 0.627 based on a survey of the ship afloat in 1937.) After water-line length, the prismatic coefficient is the next most important determinant of potential hull speed. Unladen, or with a cargo of low density, ballast was required for stability. For example, when she was loaded with wool, 200 tons of ballast was carried. The largest wool cargo she ever carried was 900 tons' weight (the total of ballast and cargo of 1,100 tons is consistent with the estimated deadweight cargo capacity of 1,135 tons at 20-foot draught). The largest tea cargo carried was 615 tons' weight. Conversely, a dense cargo allowed full use of the deadweight capacity: if loaded with coal, she would usually carry 1,100 tons.

Broadly, the parts of the ship visible above the waterline were constructed from East India teak, while American rock elm was used for the ship's bottom. The stem, 15 in × 15 in (38 cm × 38 cm), and sternpost, 16.5 in × 15 in (42 cm × 38 cm), were of teak while the rudder was of English oak. The keel was replaced in the 1920s with one constructed from 15-inch (38 cm) pitch pine. The deck was made of 3.5-inch-thick (8.9 cm) teak while the 'tween deck was 3-inch (7.6 cm) yellow pine. The keel, 16.5 in × 15 in (42 cm × 38 cm), had on either side a garboard strake, 11 in × 12 in (28 cm × 30 cm), and then 6-inch (150 mm) planking decreasing to 4.75 in (12.1 cm) at one-fifth the depth of the hold. Teak planking began at approximately the level of the bilge stringer. The hull was covered by Muntz metal sheeting up to the 18-foot (5.5 m) depth mark, and all the external timbers were secured by Muntz metal bolts to the internal iron frame. The wrought-iron frame was an innovation first experimented with in shipbuilding in the 1840s, and was the standard building method for tea clippers by the middle of the 1860s. It consisted of frames (vertical), beams (horizontal) and cross bracing (diagonal members).

The diagonally-braced iron frame made for a strong, rigid ship; diagonal members prevent racking (shearing, where frame rectangles become parallelograms). Less working and leaking of the hull meant less crew time spent pumping, allowing more time to be spent on changes of sail. The wrought-iron-framed hull also took up less cargo space than an all-wood hull would have done. The Muntz metal sheeting reduced fouling of Cutty Sark's hull; with a cleaner hull, she could sail faster.

== Performance ==
Master's opinion

She was built for me. I superintended the building and fitting of her, and I never sailed a finer ship. At ten or twelve knots she did not disturb the water at all. Although she was a very sharp ship, just like a yacht, her spread of canvas was enormous, ... She was the fastest ship of her day, a grand ship, a ship that will last forever.

— Captain George Moodie
A speck on the horizon

One day we sighted a vessel, a mere speck on the horizon, astern of us, and the way she came into view it was evident she was travelling much faster than ourselves. 'Bringing the wind up with her' was remarked on board, and that seemed the only feasible conclusion to arrive at and account for the manner in which she overhauled us. In a few hours she was alongside us, and proved to be the famous British clipper Cutty Sark, one of the fastest ships afloat. She passed us going two feet to our one, and in a short time was hull down ahead of us.

— Wool clipper crewman, 1879

The maximum logged speed for Cutty Sark was 17.5 knots (32.4 km/h; 20.1 mph). Her greatest recorded distance in noon to noon sights was 363 nautical miles (672 km; 418 mi) averaging 15 knots (28 km/h; 17 mph), although she recorded 2,164 nautical miles (4,008 km; 2,490 mi) in six days, which given the weather over the whole period implied she had achieved over 370 nmi (690 km; 430 mi) some days. By comparison, Thermopylae's best-recorded 24-hour distance was 358 nmi (663 km; 412 mi). On another occasion she recorded 3,457 nmi (6,402 km; 3,978 mi) in 11 days. Cutty Sark was considered to have the edge in a heavier wind, and Thermopylae in a lighter wind.

== Name ==
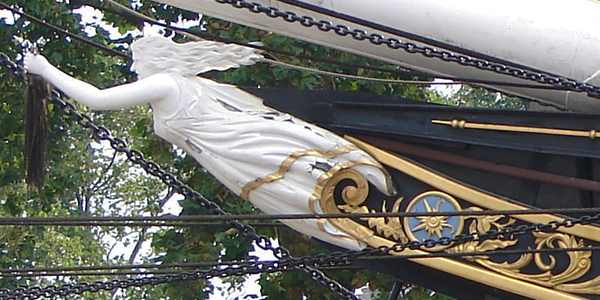
The ship's figurehead shows Cutty-sark, the nickname of the witch Nannie Dee who chases a drunk farmer, Tam o' Shanter, snatching his horse's tail before he escapes by crossing water.

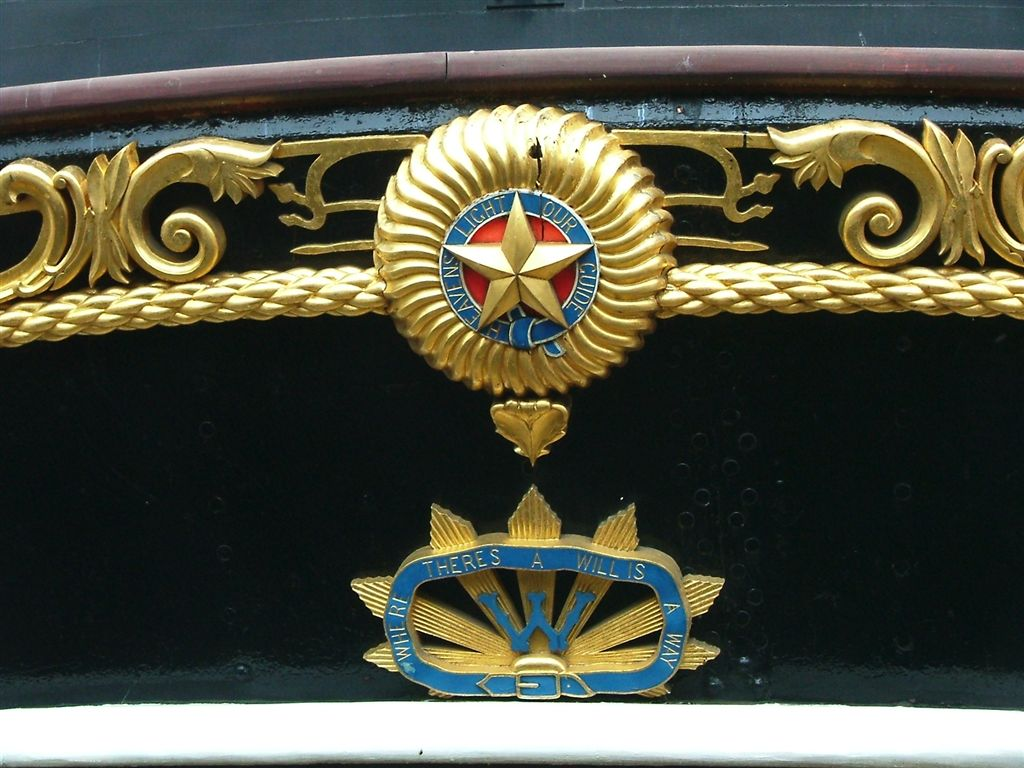
Motto and Star of India emblem on the stern of the ship

The ship was named after Cutty-sark, the nickname of the witch Nannie Dee in Robert Burns's 1791 poem Tam o' Shanter. The ship's figurehead, the original of which has been attributed to carver Fredrick Hellyer of Blackwall, is a stark white carving of a bare-breasted Nannie Dee with long black hair holding a grey horse's tail in her hand. In the poem she wore a sark (Scots: a chemise or undergarment), made of harn (Scots: coarse linen), that she had been given as a child, which explains why it was cutty, or in other words far too short. The erotic sight of her dancing, dressed only in short underwear, caused Tam to cry out "Weel done, Cutty-sark", which subsequently became a well-known catchphrase. Originally, carvings by Hellyer of the other scantily clad witches followed behind the figurehead along the bow, but these were removed by Willis in deference to 'good taste'. Tam o' Shanter riding Meg was to be seen along the ship's quarter. The motto "Where theres a will is a way" was inscribed along the taffrail, with variable spaces enabling also the reading Where there(')s a Willis away. The Tweed, which acted as a model for much of the ship which followed her, had a figurehead depicting Tam o' Shanter.

== History ==
=== First tea seasons ===
Cutty Sark was destined for the tea trade, a seasonal trade of a high-value cargo from China to London. Though the "premium" or bonus paid to the ship that arrived with the first tea of the year was abandoned after the Great Tea Race of 1866, faster ships could usually obtain a higher price for transporting their cargoes than others. Her first roundtrip voyage under captain George Moodie began 16 February 1870 from London with a cargo of wine, spirits and beer bound for Shanghai. The return journey, carrying 1,305,812 pounds (592,306 kg) of tea from Shanghai, began 25 June, arriving 13 October in London via the Cape of Good Hope.

Cutty Sark sailed in eight "tea seasons", from London to China and back.

Cutty Sark's tea runs
Year	From	To	Days
1870	Shanghai	Beachy Head	109
1871	Shanghai	North Foreland	107
1872	Shanghai	Portland	120
1873	Shanghai	Deal	116
1874	Woosung	Deal	118
1875	Woosung	Deal	122
1876	Woosung	Start	108
1877	Woosung	Scilly	122

=== Competition from steamers ===
Cutty Sark's launch coincided with the opening of the Suez Canal to shipping in 1869. Her first trip encountered significant competition with steamships. The route from the Far East to London (and many other European ports) through the Suez Canal was shorter by about 3,300 nautical miles (6,100 km; 3,800 mi), compared to sailing round the Cape of Good Hope. The route round Africa is in excess of 14,000 nmi (26,000 km; 16,000 mi). Typically a clipper might log significantly more than that by planning her route for favourable winds. Whilst it was possible for a sailing vessel to take a tug through the canal, this was difficult and expensive. Furthermore, sailing conditions in the northern Red Sea were unsuited to the design of a tea clipper, so they still had to sail around Africa. The ability of a steamer to make, for example, 10 knots (19 km/h; 12 mph) continuously, versus the fastest clipper voyage averaging under 6.5 knots (12.0 km/h; 7.5 mph) over a longer distance, gave steamships not only a more predictable voyage time, but a substantially quicker one. (Note: For this arithmetic, the speed of a steamer is that of SS Agamemnon. The "fastest clipper voyage" is that of Ariel in 1865. Ariel's log for that voyage shows about 15,800 nmi (29,300 km; 18,200 mi) for the voyage, which took 99 days.)

Less obviously, steamship design had taken a large step forward in 1866 with Agamemnon, using higher boiler pressure and a compound engine, so obtaining a large improvement in fuel efficiency. Ships of this type could compete with clippers before the Suez Canal opened.

When the tea clippers arrived in China in 1870, they found a big increase in the number of steamers, which were in high demand. The rate of freight to London that was given to steamers was nearly twice that paid to the sailing ships. Additionally, the insurance premium for a cargo of tea in a steamer was substantially less than for a sailing vessel. So successful were the steamers using the Suez Canal that, in 1871, 45 were built in Clyde shipyards alone for Far Eastern trade.

The numbers of tea clippers sailing to China each year steadily reduced, with many ships being sold and moving to general cargo work. Costs were kept to a minimum and rigs were often reduced to barque so that a smaller crew was needed.

=== Thermopylae ===
Cutty Sark's well-known race against Thermopylae took place in 1872, the two ships leaving Shanghai together on 18 June. Both ships were of similar size: length, beam and depths were within one foot (0.3 m) of each other. The Thermopylae had a slightly larger capacity: 991 compared to 963 (GRT) or 948 compared to 921 (net). Two weeks later Cutty Sark had built up a lead of some 400 nautical miles (460 mi; 740 km), but then lost her rudder in a heavy gale after passing through the Sunda Strait. John Willis's brother was on board the ship and ordered Moodie to put into Cape Town for repairs. Moodie refused, and instead the ship's carpenter Henry Henderson constructed a new rudder from spare timbers and iron. This took six days, working in gales and heavy seas which meant the men were tossed about as they worked and the brazier used to heat the metal for working was spilled out, burning the captain's son. The ship finally arrived in London on 18 October a week after Thermopylae, a total passage of 122 days. The captain and crew were commended for their performance and Henderson received a £50 bonus for his work. This was the closest Cutty Sark came to being first ship home but it was Moodie's last trip as her captain before he transferred to steamships. He was replaced by Captain F. W. Moore.

Life at Sea

A little east of the longitude of the Cape we were favoured by a great fair wind blow, that tested all the resources of ship and crew. At the first spurt, heavy squalls came up from S.W., that threatened to take toll of our masts, but later it steadied down to a hurricane straight from the west.

Captain Wallace was sure in his element now. It was 'Stand by!' the whole time, not knowing whether the sticks would go, but the splendid rigging and equipment of sails in the Cutty Sark stood the strain. We lost two brand new topgallant sails and one lower fore topsail.

A tremendous sea was running and needs must we carry on or be pooped. The partial becalming of the lower sails by the stern seas was a great danger, as they filled again with a bang that threatened to burst them into tatters. It was some trick rebending sails. I had a time on the fore topsail yard for two hours. The ship took a green sea over the stern, and it appeared as if there were just three sticks set in the ocean, as it swept the length of the deck.

— A crew member writing of life on board

=== Later tea seasons ===
Moore remained captain only for one round trip to China, taking 117 days for the return trip. This was 14 days longer than Thermopylae and 27 days longer than achieved by the iron ship Hallowe'en a few months later. Captain W. E. Tiptaft assumed command in 1873 achieving 118 days on his first return trip, but after the ship had to travel 600 nautical miles (1,100 km) up the Yangtze River in search of a cargo. Steamships were now taking most of the tea. The following year the return journey took 122 days. In November 1877 the ship was anchored off Deal in the English Channel along with sixty other vessels, waiting out a great storm. The anchor failed to hold and Cutty Sark was blown through the ships, damaging two others before grounding on a mud bank. Fortunately she was pulled clear by the tug Macgregor before too much damage was caused and she was towed to the Thames for repairs.

In December 1877 the ship sailed from London to Sydney, where she took on coal for Shanghai, arriving there in April. However, the ship was unable to find any cargo of tea for a return trip to London—the days of the tea race were over. The master, Captain Tiptaft, died in October while still in Shanghai and was replaced by the first mate, James Wallace. The ship now had to take different cargoes around the world, including coal, jute, castor oil and tea to Australia.

In 1880 yards were shortened and the stun'sails removed. Also in 1880 an incident occurred on board during which the First Mate Sidney Smith killed seaman John Francis. Smith was allowed to leave the ship at Anjer by Captain Wallace, causing the crew to cease work in protest. Wallace continued the voyage with six apprentices and four tradesmen but became becalmed in the Java Sea for three days. In desperation as matters moved from bad to worse, he committed suicide by jumping overboard and disappeared. He was replaced as Master by William Bruce, who proved to be a drunken incompetent who claimed pay for non-existent crewmen and managed to set sail with inadequate provisions, resulting in the crew starving. An inquiry in New York in April 1882 resulted in the captain and mate being suspended and replaced by Captain Moore, previously of Blackadder.

=== Wool trade ===
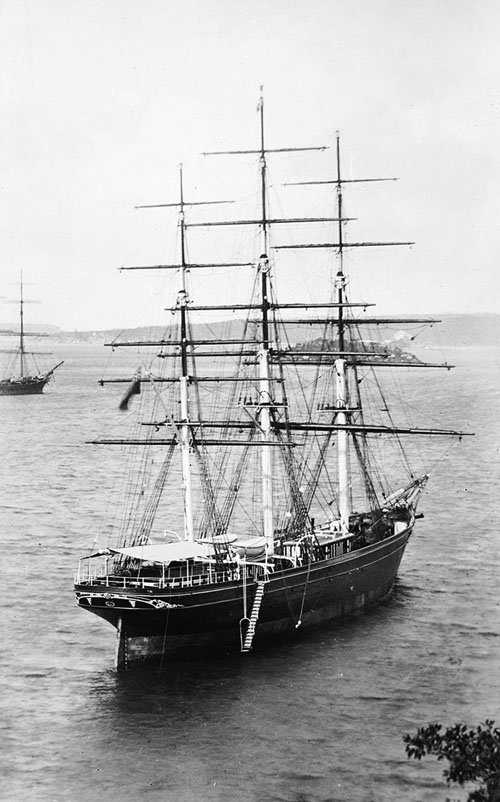
Cutty Sark in Sydney Harbour awaiting a cargo of new season's wool, c. 1890

In December 1883, Cutty Sark departed Newcastle, New South Wales with 4,289 bales of wool and 12 casks of tallow, arriving in London in just 83 days. This was 25 days faster than her nearest rival that year and heralded the start of a new career taking Australian wool to Britain in time for the January wool sales.

From 1885 to 1893, Cutty Sark was run between England and New South Wales under the agency of the Sydney-based Dangar, Gedye & Co. In 1885 Richard Woodget was appointed captain on a salary of £186 per year (£23,729.80 in 2019 when adjusted for inflation) and continued to improve on the fastest trip record, achieving 77 days on his first outward trip and 73 days returning to Britain from Australia. He achieved this by taking a more southerly route than previously, to catch the strongest winds in the Roaring Forties despite having to face icebergs, gales and storms whipped up by the winds he sought. Cutty Sark was the fastest ship on the wool trade for ten years. In July 1889 the log of the modern passenger steamship SS Britannia recorded that when steaming at 15 to 16 knots she was overtaken in the night by a sailing ship doing 17 knots, which proved to be Cutty Sark.

Cutty Sark's wool runs
Year	From	To	Days
1883–84	Newcastle, NSW	Deal	82
1884–85	Newcastle, NSW	Dock	80
1885	Sydney	Downs	73 (67 to Ushant)
1887	Sydney	Lizard	70
1887–88	Newcastle, NSW	Lizard	69
1888–89	Sydney	London	86
1889–90	Sydney	London	75
1890–91	Sydney	London	93
1891–92	Sydney	Lizard	83
1893	Sydney	Antwerp	98 (90 to Bishop's Rock)
1893–94	Sydney	Hull	93 (87 to Scilly)
1894–95	Brisbane	London	84

=== As Ferreira ===
Eventually steamships began to dominate the wool trade too and it ceased to be profitable for a sailing ship. In 1895 Jock Willis sold Cutty Sark to the Portuguese firm Joaquim Antunes Ferreira for £1,250. She was renamed Ferreira after the firm. Her crews referred to her as Pequena Camisola (little shirt, a straight translation of the Scots cutty sark).

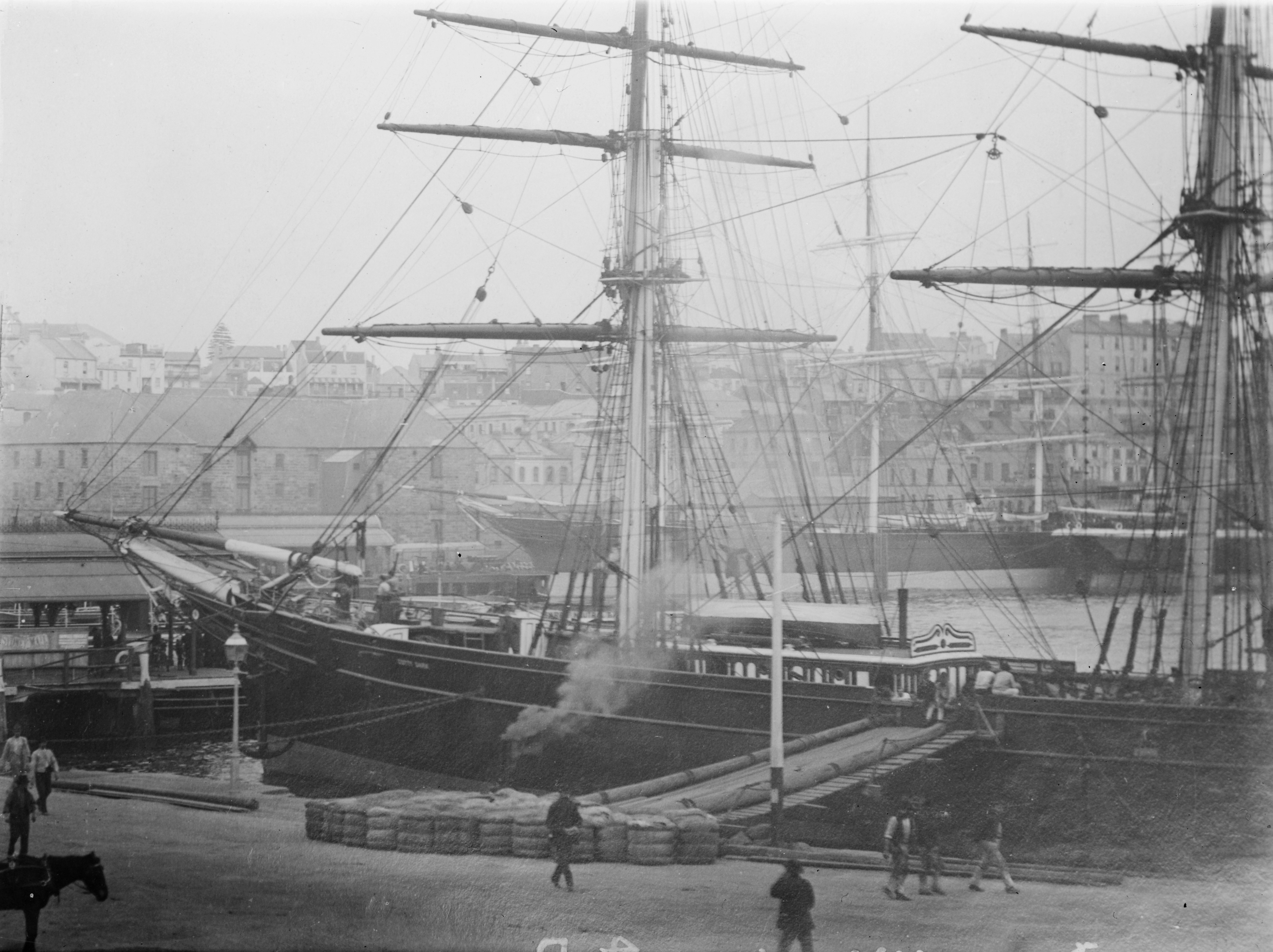
Cutty Sark moored at Circular Quay, Sydney (circa 1880). Another clipper can be seen in the background.

The ship traded various cargoes between Portugal, Rio de Janeiro, New Orleans, Mozambique, Angola, and Britain. In May 1916 she was dismasted off the Cape of Good Hope because of the rolling of the ship in bad weather and had to be towed into Table Bay off Cape Town. Because of World War I, it was impossible to obtain suitable materials to replace the masts so she was re-rigged over 18 months to a barquentine sail arrangement.

In 1922 Ferreira was the last clipper operating anywhere in the world. Caught in a storm in the English Channel she put into Falmouth harbour where she was spotted by retired merchant navy captain Wilfred Dowman of Flushing, Cornwall, who was then operating the training ship Lady of Avenel. The ship returned to Lisbon, where she was sold to new owners and renamed Maria do Amparo (Mary of the Refuge, a name associated with the devotion of Our Lady of the Refuge; in Portuguese, "Nossa Senhora do Amparo").

=== As cadet training ship ===
Dowman persevered in his determination to buy the ship, which he did for £3,750 and she was returned to Falmouth harbour. The purchase was made with the support of Dowman's wife, artist Catharine Dowman (née Courtauld), heiress daughter of Sydney Courtauld, crepe and silk manufacturer.

The rigging was restored to an approximation of the original arrangement and the ship was used as a cadet training ship. In 1924 she was used as committee boat for the regatta week in Fowey during that years regatta week as recalled to me by Mr. Arthur (Toby) West. As a historic survivor, the ship was opened to the public and visitors would be rowed out to inspect her. Dowman died in 1936 and the ship was given by Catharine Dowman, his widow, along with £5,000 for maintenance, to the Incorporated Thames Nautical Training College, HMS Worcester at Greenhithe. She was towed to Greenhithe by tug. The ship was crewed by cadets, 15-year-old Robert Wyld steering the ship during the voyage.

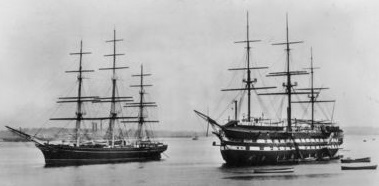
Cutty Sark and HMS Worcester as training ships, 1938

At Greenhithe, Cutty Sark acted as an auxiliary vessel to HMS Worcester for sail training drill, but by 1950 she had become surplus to requirements. From February to October 1951 she was temporarily moved first for a refit and then to take part in the Festival of Britain at Deptford. On 30 January 1952, the 800-ton tanker MV Aqueity collided with Cutty Sark's bow in the Thames. The two ships were locked together after the collision which forced Cutty Sark's jibboom into Worcester's forecastle rails, snapping the boom before scraping along Worcester's starboard side. Cutty Sark's figurehead lost an arm in the process. Worcester was a condemned hulk, sunk at her moorings at the time, photographs showing her lying on her starboard side with her starboard side near the shore. Cutty Sark was anchored and towed to the Shadwell Basin where repairs were carried out by Green & Silley Weir Ltd. The damaged arm was recovered at Grays Thurrock and the figurehead was repaired.

== Museum ship ==
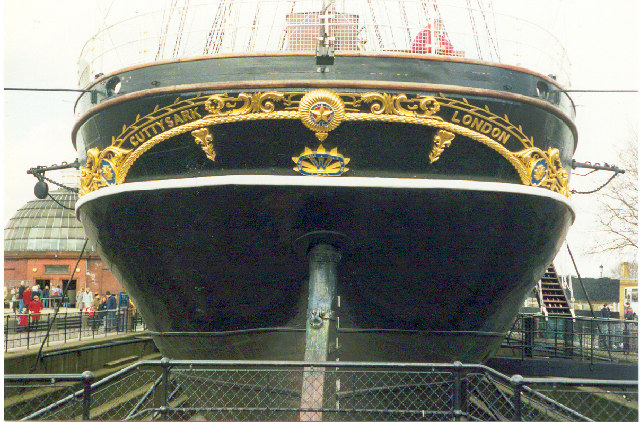
Ship's stern before renovation in 1994. The original dock arrangement can also be seen.

In 1953 Cutty Sark was given to the Cutty Sark Preservation Society and in 1954 she was moved to a custom-built dry dock at Greenwich. She was stripped of upper masts, yards, deck-houses and ballast to lighten her before being towed from the East India Import Dock to the special dry dock at Greenwich. The skipper on this occasion was 83-year-old Captain C.E. Irving, who had sailed the world three times in her before he was 17. The river pilot was Ernest Coe. Thereafter the entrance tunnel to the dry dock was filled in, the river wall rebuilt and the work of re-rigging began. The foundation stone of the dry dock was laid by The Duke of Edinburgh, patron of the Cutty Sark Preservation Society, in June 1953. The restoration, re-rigging and preparation for public exhibition was estimated to cost £250,000.

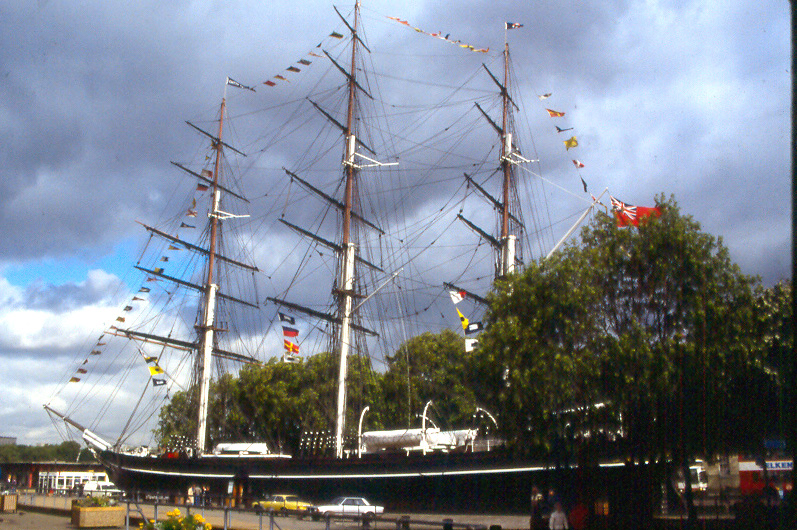
Cutty Sark, 8 October 1987

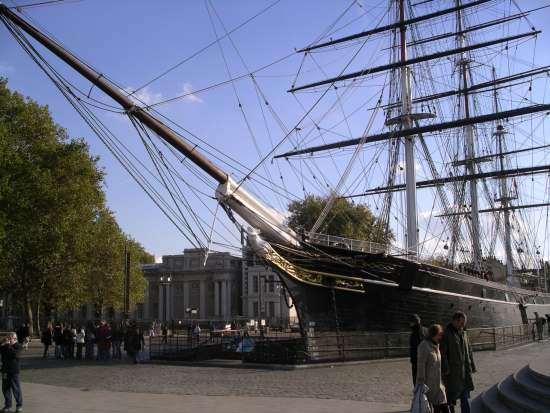
Cutty Sark in Greenwich, October 2003

Cutty Sark was preserved as a museum ship, and has since become a popular tourist attraction, and part of the National Historic Fleet. She is located near the centre of Greenwich, in south-east London, close to the National Maritime Museum, the former Greenwich Hospital, and Greenwich Park. She is also a prominent landmark on the route of the London Marathon and marks the finish of The Big Half. She usually flies signal flags from her ensign halyard reading "JKWS", which is the code representing Cutty Sark in the International Code of Signals, introduced in 1857.

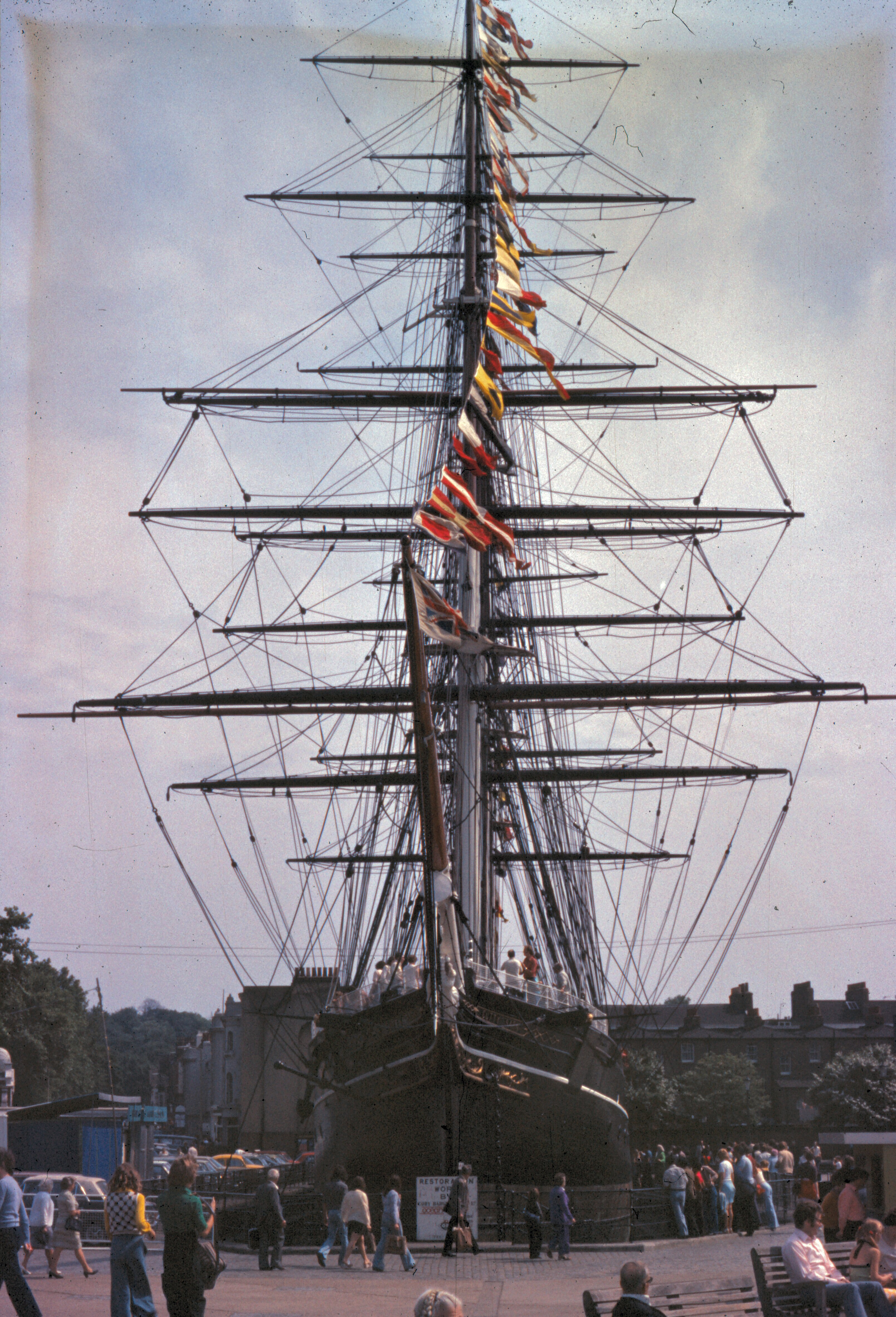
Cutty Sark in Greenwich, 1977

The ship is in the care of the Cutty Sark Trust, whose president, the then Duke of Edinburgh, was instrumental in ensuring her preservation, when he set up the Cutty Sark Society in 1951. The Trust replaced the Society in 2000. She is a Grade I listed monument and was on the Buildings at Risk Register following the 2007 fire. The gallery beneath the ship holds the world's largest collection of ships' figureheads, donated to the Society by Sydney Cumbers in 1953.

Cutty Sark station on the Docklands Light Railway is one minute's walk away, with connections to central London and the London Underground. Greenwich Pier is next to the ship, and is served by scheduled river boats from piers in central London. A tourist information office stands to the east of the ship.

=== Conservation and fire ===
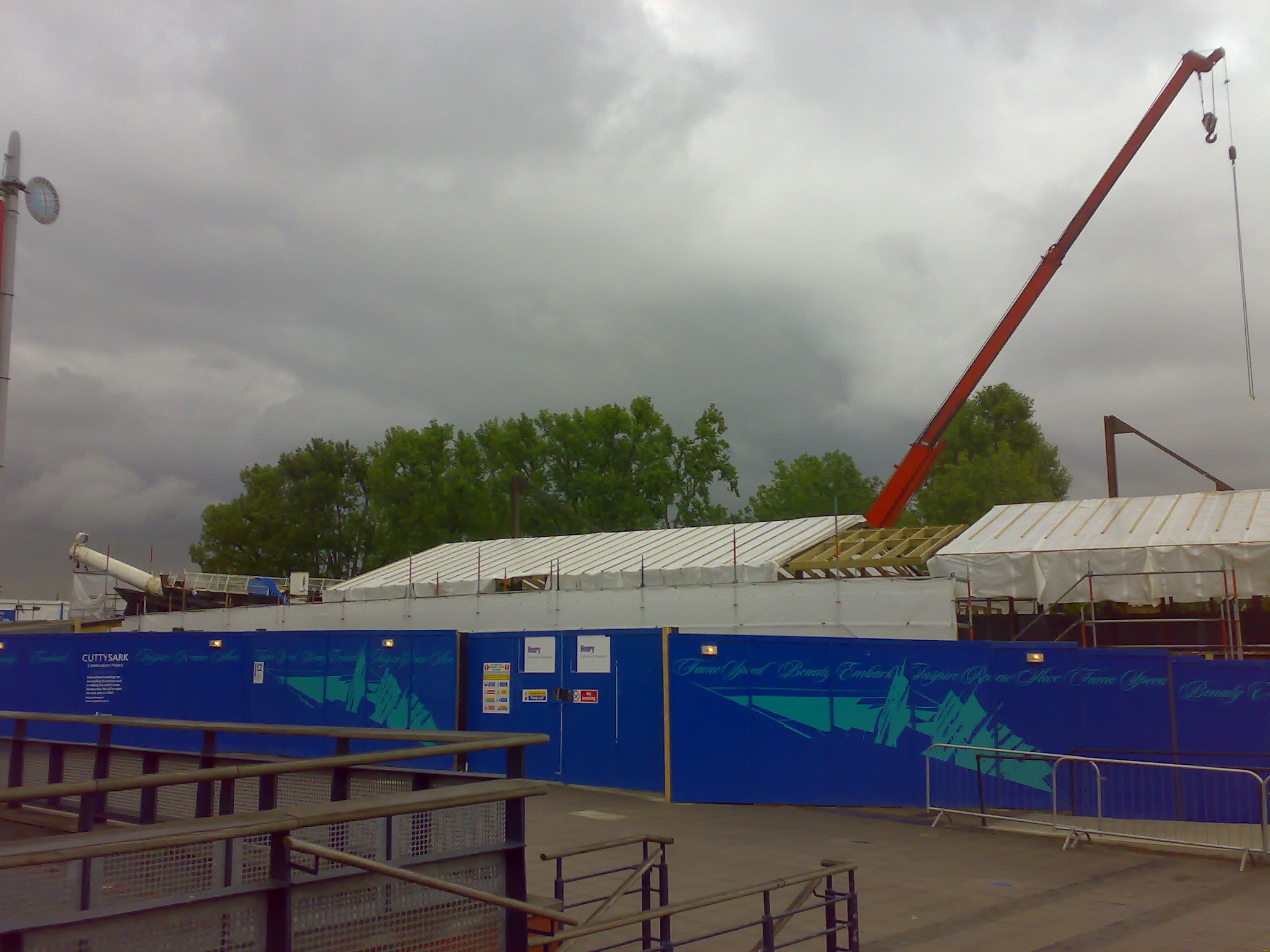
The ship one week before the fire. Most of the upper sections had already been dismantled for renovation.

Cutty Sark on fire, in May 2007

By the early 2000s, there were serious concerns about corrosion of the iron internal structure, and the hull was also becoming distorted because more weight was being carried on the keel than if the ship was afloat, when it would be evenly supported over the whole area below the waterline. An extensive conservation project was planned to overcome this, including repair and anti-corrosion painting of the framework, the addition of steel ribs to add strength, and a new method of supporting the ship.

On the morning of 21 May 2007, Cutty Sark, which had been closed and partly dismantled for conservation work, caught fire, and burned for several hours before the London Fire Brigade could bring the fire under control. Initial reports indicated that the damage was extensive, with most of the wooden structure in the centre having been lost.

In an interview the next day, Richard Doughty, the chief executive of the Cutty Sark Trust, revealed that at least half of the "fabric" (timbers, etc.) of the ship had not been on site as it had been removed during the preservation work. Doughty stated that the trust was most worried about the state of iron framework to which the fabric was attached. He did not know how much more the ship would cost to restore, but estimated it at an additional £5–10 million, bringing the total cost of the ship's restoration to £30–35 million.

In initial investigations, the possibility was covered that the fire might have been started deliberately. The fire was later found to have most likely been caused by an industrial vacuum cleaner which had been left running over the weekend, compounded by the absence of the overnight fire watchers.

In a second incident on the morning of 19 October 2014, another fire broke out on the deck of the Cutty Sark. A small part of deck three and the hull timbers were damaged in the blaze. The London Fire Brigade managed to contain the blaze within an hour and she was reopened to the public shortly after.

==== Damage ====
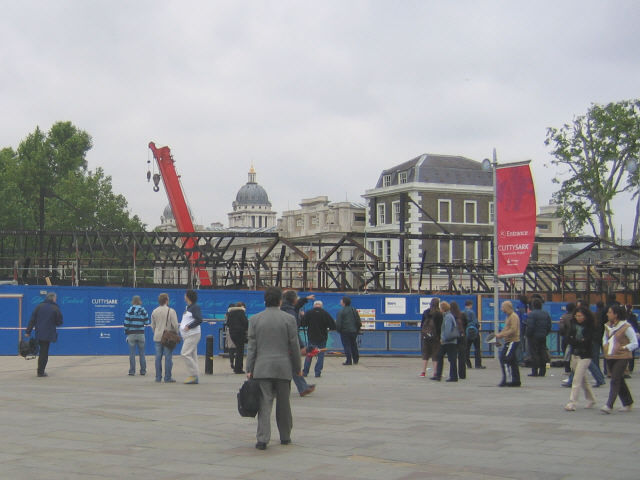
The day after the fire, 22 May 2007

Aerial video footage showed extensive damage, but seemed to indicate that the ship had not been destroyed in her entirety by the 2007 fire. A fire officer present at the scene said in a BBC interview that when they arrived, there had been "a well-developed fire throughout the ship". The bow section looked to be relatively unscathed and the stern also appeared to have survived without major damage; the fire seemed to have been concentrated in the centre of the ship. The chairman of Cutty Sark Enterprises said after inspecting the site: "The decks are unsalvageable but around 50% of the planking had already been removed; however, the damage is not as bad as originally expected."

As part of the restoration work planned before the fire, it was proposed that the ship be raised three metres (10 ft), to allow the construction of a state-of-the-art museum space beneath. This would allow visitors to view her from below.

There was criticism of the policies of the Cutty Sark Trust and its stance that the most important thing was to preserve as much as possible of the original fabric. Proponents of making her fit to go to sea advocated that the fire repairs be done in such a manner to enable her to do so.

However, the state of the timbers, especially the keel, and the fact that a hole had been cut through the hull in the 1950s for an access door, made this difficult. The Cutty Sark Trust said that less than five percent of the original fabric was lost in the fire, as the decks which were destroyed were additions not present at the original building.

The restoration work was criticised by The Victorian Society saying that the needs of the corporate hospitality market were put ahead of the preservation of the historic fabric of the ship. Building Design magazine awarded the project its Carbuncle Cup for the worst new building completed in 2012 saying "The scheme's myriad failings stem from one calamitous choice: the decision to hoick the 144-year-old clipper close to three metres into the air on canted steel props."

==== Fundraising ====
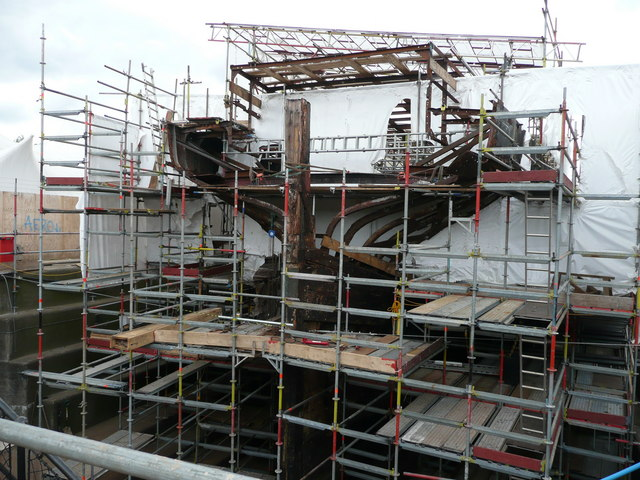
Cutty Sark during repairs after the fire

The design for the renovation project by Grimshaw architects with, during design development stage, newly established Youmeheshe architects and Buro Happold engineers involved raising the ship out of her dry berth using a Kevlar web, allowing visitors to pass under the hull to view it. Unfortunately it was discovered that the proposed web would not follow the reverse curves of the ship's hull which would effectively mask the hull's shape from view. An alternate design for the support of the ship had to be developed; this involved installing a deep steel belt around the hull tied by diagonal steel members passing through the hold to a new steel-reinforced keel. Horizontal tubular steel struts passing through the hold brace the diagonals apart while many of the corroded original hull frames have been doubled.

A new steelwork lower deck of contemporary design incorporating an amphitheatre feature was installed in the main hold while a glass-encased lift installed within the ship terminates in a new steel-and-glass housing structure on the weather deck. A second new steel-and-glass box has been installed above the forehold to enclose a new staircase. Access to the ship is through a new opening cut through the hull below the waterline in the ship's starboard quarter. The new access hole has required the addition of new steel framing. Visitors arriving on board the ship now do so via this entrance, which leads to the lower hold. Maldwin Drummond, Chairman of the Cutty Sark Trust, has explained in Classic Boat magazine's September 2010 issue the need to retain the spirit of the ship and he quotes the ideal that "The visitor should see the ship as though for some unexplained reason the crew had gone ashore". Doubts over the wisdom of Grimshaw's proposals have been raised by many ship conservationists including the Cutty Sark Trust's own engineer Peter Mason.

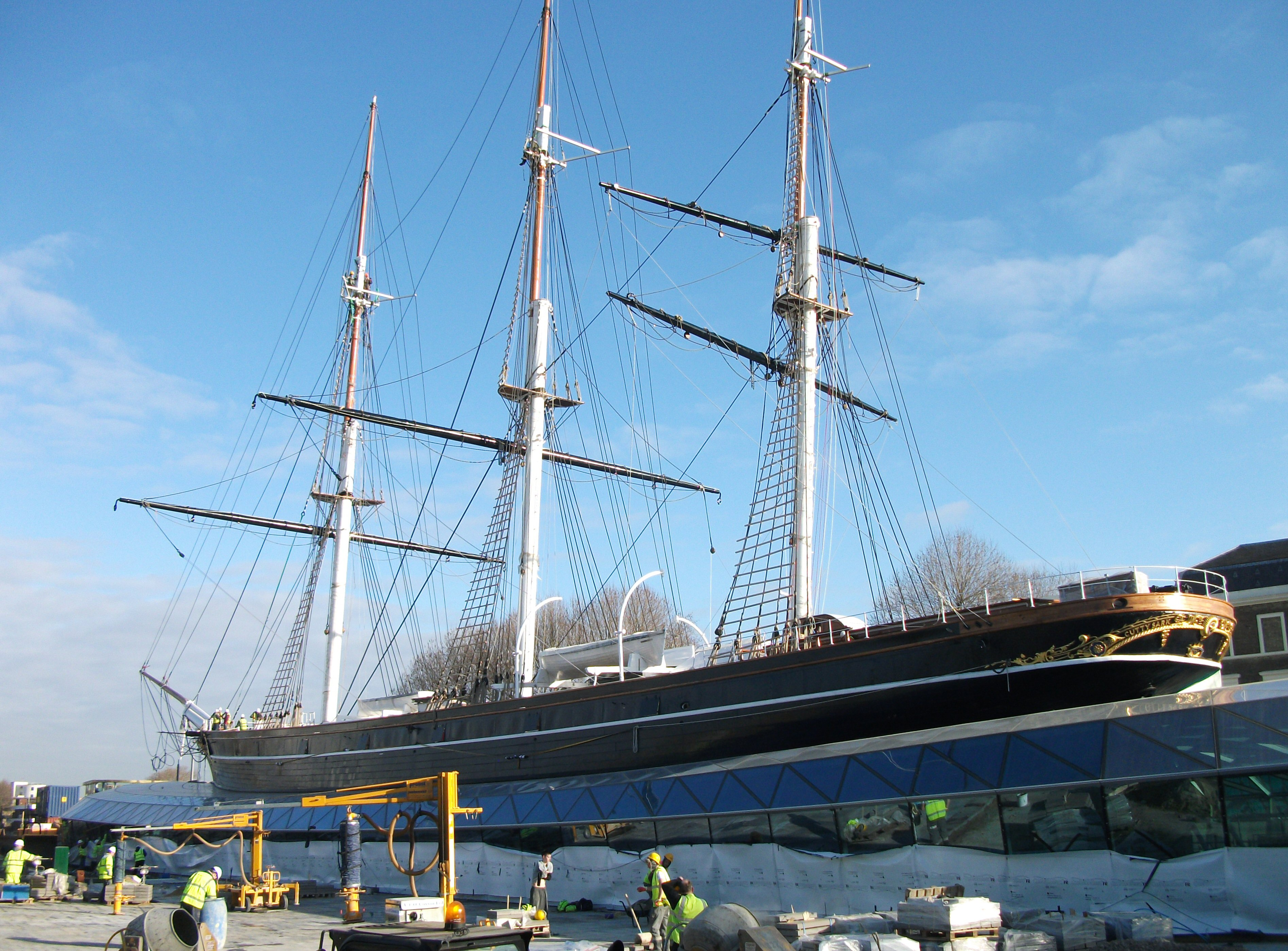
Cutty Sark in February 2012, repairs nearing completion. The temporary cover which surrounded the ship during repair has been removed although workmen can still be seen on deck and in the rigging where not all yards have been replaced. Work was underway around the dock to lay new paving.

The project was costed at £25 million when it commenced in 2006 with £11.75 million of this total being provided by a grant from the Heritage Lottery Fund.

Oscar-winning film producer Jerry Bruckheimer aided in the repair and restoration of Cutty Sark. A collection of photos taken by Bruckheimer went on display in London in November 2007 to help raise money for the Cutty Sark Conservation Project. The exhibition featured more than thirty pictures taken on set during the filming of Pirates of the Caribbean: At World's End.

In January 2008, the Heritage Lottery Fund awarded the Cutty Sark Trust another £10 million towards the restoration of the ship, meaning that the Trust had now achieved £30 million of the £35 million needed for the completion of the project. In June 2008, Israeli shipping magnate Sammy Ofer donated the outstanding £3.3 million needed to fully restore the ship although by January 2009 the London Evening Standard reported that the cost had risen further to £40 million creating a new shortfall.

In February 2010, The Daily Telegraph reported the project cost had risen to £46 million with public money now being made available by London Borough of Greenwich to fill the funding gap.

==== Investigation conclusion ====
On 30 September 2008, the London Fire Brigade announced the conclusion of the investigation into the fire at a press conference at New Scotland Yard. The painstaking investigation was conducted by the Fire Brigade, along with London's Metropolitan Police Service, Forensic Science Services, and electrical examination experts Dr. Burgoyne's & Partners. They said that the most likely cause was the failure of an industrial vacuum cleaner that may have been left switched on over the weekend before the fire started. The report revealed no evidence that the ship was subjected to arson attack and concluded that the fire started accidentally.

Physical evidence and CCTV footage of the fire showed that it probably started towards the stern of the ship on the lower deck. All electrical equipment on board was examined and it was determined that an industrial vacuum cleaner in this area was normally running continuously to suck up dust and particles from work going on to break up concrete within the ship. No one working on the ship had responsibility to ensure all equipment was turned off at the end of each day, and no one recalled switching off the equipment on the Friday in question. The vacuum cleaner has three motors inside and after the fire one was found to be burned out in a manner which suggested it had failed while operating. This was not conclusive evidence, however, because the motor might previously have failed in service without causing a fire, and gone unnoticed because the other two motors had continued to function. Tests on similar cleaners showed they had no thermal cutout devices and while they could run safely indefinitely if filters inside were clear, if the airflow through the cleaner was blocked then it would eventually overheat and could catch fire. This might occur if the cleaner were full of dust and debris. The cleaner had failed previously and two motors had been replaced.

On the basis of witness evidence, the joint investigation team considered it unlikely that the fire was caused by the hot work (welding) that was being carried out as part of the renovation or by carelessly discarded smokers' materials. No one had visited this part of the ship since work stopped on Friday evening, and it was considered unlikely that a fire could have smouldered all weekend before finally breaking out Monday morning. However, it was discovered that although all hot work was supposed to be recorded and someone was supposed to check afterwards to ensure of no fires, there was no record that such checks had ever been made, and on at least one occasion hot work had been conducted with no records made.

The ship was patrolled by two security guards, both of whom were supposed to patrol independently at least once an hour, or once every two hours later in the night, one being primarily responsible for the visitor pavilion and one for the dock. The guards were required to keep a log of their patrols, but after the fire the relevant page was found to be missing from the book. It was later found, already filled in reporting uneventful patrols of the site up to 7 a.m. when the guards would have gone off duty. The alarm was raised when one of the guards called the fire brigade; before this the two reported that they had smelled burning plastic and had been investigating to try to determine its source.

A carpenter had visited the site on Sunday to collect some tools, but after 20 minutes attempting to contact a security guard to let him in, had climbed the fence, collected his tools and climbed out again. The carpenter reported that he had heard machinery operating towards the stern of the ship, but it was not clear whether this might have been the site diesel generator which ran at all times.

The ship was fitted with a temporary fire alarm system but it was unclear whether this had operated. A separate alarm within the pavilion did sound when smoke and heat reached that area, but the guards reported no ringing alarm before the fire was seen. Investigation afterwards discovered a faulty relay in the alarm panel which failed to switch power to the siren circuits when an alarm was triggered. However, the panel also contained a failed fuse in one siren circuit which suggested that the siren had activated but the fire shorted it out, and this might have also caused the relay to fail. The failed relay would have shut off power to the second siren circuit. Statements from workers suggested that weekly tests of the alarm system had not been carried out.

== Mast specifications ==
The original mast specifications as laid down by the ship's designer still exist and are listed below as "tea rig". This arrangement was used during the ship's time on the tea trade route, where it was necessary to maximise the area of sail to get the greatest possible propulsion when the ship might be becalmed in the doldrums. For the route to Australia it was not necessary to carry such a large area of sail and the masts and yards were reduced. The tradewinds required great strength in masts, but the wind could best be captured by relatively small, high sails. A smaller rig also represented a saving in maintenance and operation costs. Each of the three masts (fore, main and mizzen) is in three overlapping sections.

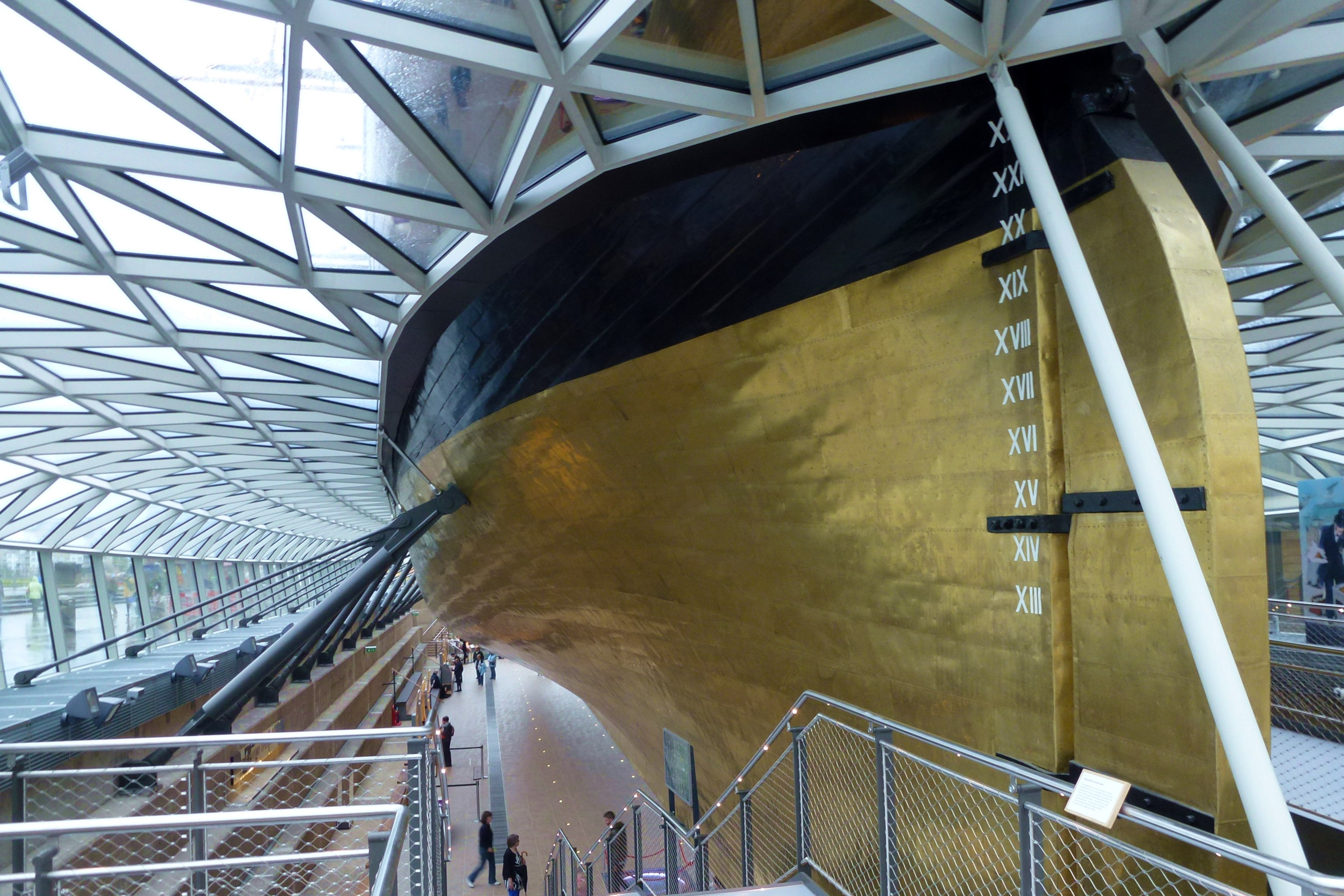
The restored stern, sheathed in Muntz metal, elevated three metres above its dry dock under its glass-roofed visitors' centre in June 2012

Mast heights above deck in metres
	Tea rig	Sydney
Foretop	18.8	16.5
Topgallant	29.8	24.3
Royal	39.6	35.4
Maintop	19.8	16.9
Topgallant	31.9	22.8
Royal		36.3
Skysail	44.5	
Mizzentop	17.0	14.8
Topgallant	25.7	22.8
Royal	33.2	31.7

Yard lengths in metres
	Tea rig	Sydney
Fore course	23.8	21.0
Lowertopsail	20.7	16.8
Uppertopsail	19.5	14.6
Topgallant	14.6	11.5
Royal	11.6	9.4
Main course	23.8	21.6
Lowertopsail	20.7	18.5
Uppertopsail	19.5	16.8
Topgallant	14.6	14.2
Royal	11.6	10.4
Skysail	10.4	
Mizzen course	18.3	17.4
Lowertopsail	16.5	14.9
Uppertopsail	14.6	13.4
Topgallant	11.9	11.0
Royal	10.1	8.2
Spanker	15.8	14.1

== See also ==
- "Cutty Sark"
- Falls of Clyde
- Gipsy Moth IV
- List of clipper ships
- List of large sailing vessels
- List of ships built by William Denny and Brothers
- Star of India
- The Cowboy Captain of the Cutty Sark
- William Pile

== Bibliography ==
- Lubbock, Basil (1924). The Log of the Cutty Sark. Glasgow, Scotland: James Brown and Son.
- Brettle, Robert E. (1969). The Cutty Sark, Her Designer and Builder, Hercules Linton, 1836–1900. Cambridge, England: W. Heffer & Sons.
- Villiers, Alan (1953). The Cutty Sark – Last of a Glorious Era. Hodder & Stoughton. p. 96.
