= Cutty-sark (witch) =

Poetic pursuer

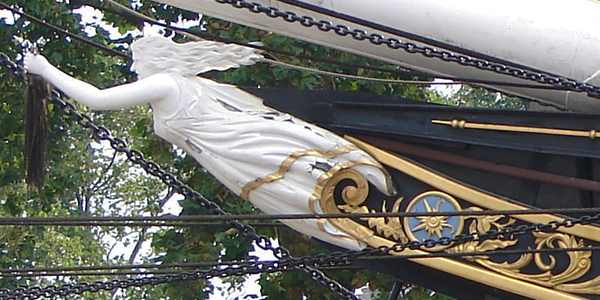
Cutty-sark figurehead on the British clipper of the same name.

Cutty-sark (18th century Scots for a short chemise or undergarment) is a nickname given to Nannie, a fictional witch created by Robert Burns in his 1791 poem "Tam o' Shanter", after the garment she wore. In the poem, the erotic sight of her dancing in such short clothing caused the protagonist Tam to cry out "Weel done, Cutty-sark", which subsequently became a well-known catchphrase.

She gave her name to the tea clipper Cutty Sark, which featured her figurehead at the bow.

== Tam o' Shanter ==
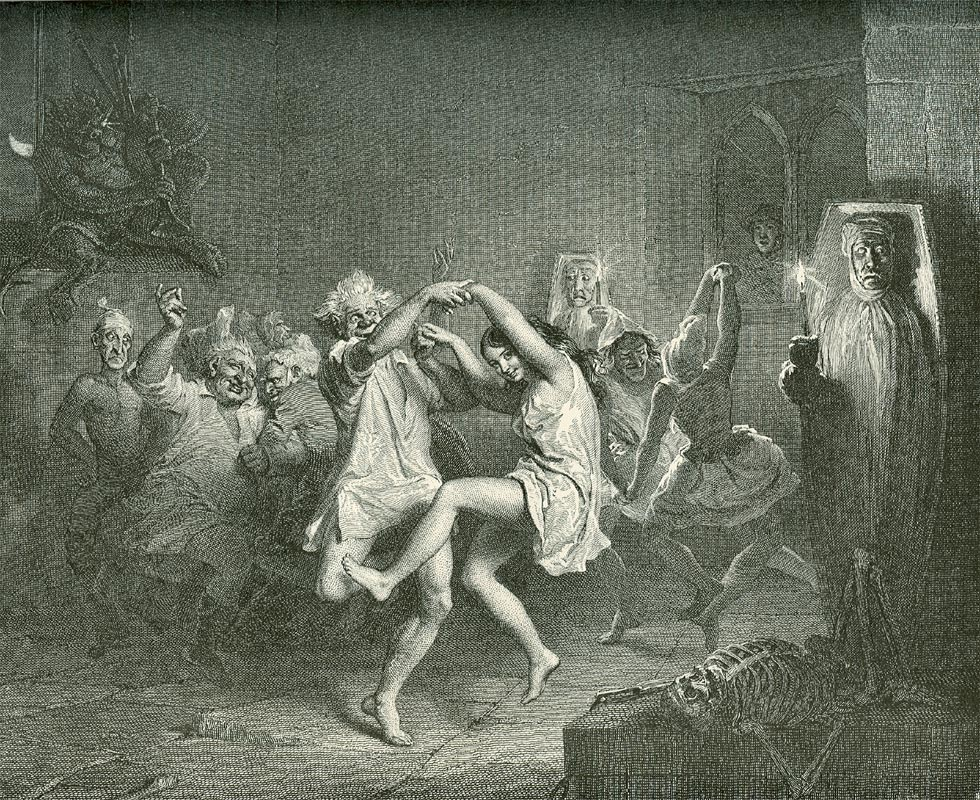
John Faed illustrated the witch in the poem

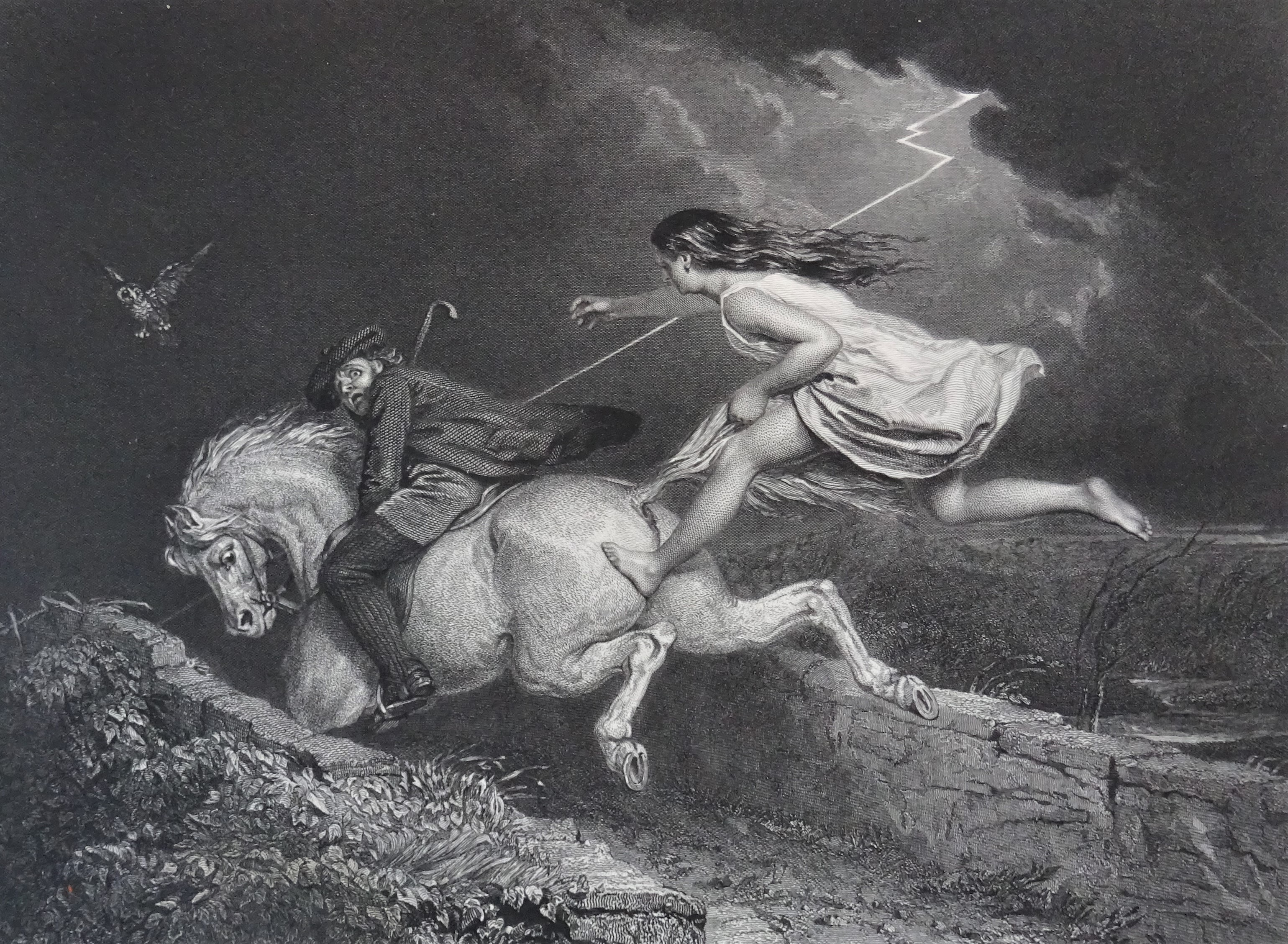

In Burns' poem Tam o' Shanter (first published in 1791), the drunken Tam, riding home on his horse, happens upon a witches' dance. Among the dancing figures is a particularly beautiful young witch named Nannie (Scots pet-form of Anna), "ae winsome wench and wawlie" (line 164). She is wearing a harn (coarse linen) sark (shift or chemise) which fitted her as a lassie (girl) but is now rather too cutty (short) for her:

Her cutty sark, o' Paisley harn,
That while a lassie she had worn,
In longitude tho' sorely scanty,
It was her best, and she was vauntie.
Ah! little kend thy reverend grannie
That sark she coft for her wee Nannie
Wi' twa pund Scots ('twas a' her riches)
Wad ever graced a dance of witches! (lines 171ff)

(lassie, "girl"; vauntie, "joyous, boasting"; kend, "knew"; coft, "bought"; twa, "two".)

Tam is so enthralled by the erotic spectacle that he cannot contain himself and yells out, "Weel done, Cutty-sark!" (line 189). The witches are now alerted to his presence and pursue him. Tam heads for the River Doon, because, according to folklore, witches cannot cross running water. He makes it across the bridge to safety, but not before Nannie, the "Cutty-sark", has torn the tail from his horse. The poem ends ironically, with a mock warning to all men of the devilish consequences of thinking about scantily-clad females.

The popularity of this poem was such that the phrase, "Weel done, Cutty-sark!", entered the English language via Scots as an exclamation similar to "Bravo!". Literary allusions to the original Cutty-sark abound. For example, in Ulysses, James Joyce writes, "Laughing witches in red cutty sarks ride through the air on broom sticks" (p. 695).

== See also ==
- Cutty Sark (whisky) – Blended Scotch whisky
- Cuttie-stool – Short stool
