= Tea race =

In the middle third of the 19th century, the clippers which carried cargoes of tea from China to Britain would compete in informal tea races to be first ship to dock in London with the new crop of each season. These races were also known as the races from China. The consignees of these cargoes wanted to be first in the market with this new crop, so they started to offer a "premium" to a ship that was the first to dock in London in that tea season.

The premium existed as an extra freight payment written into the bill of lading. The first ship known to sail with this contractual provision was Vision, with a premium of an extra £1 per ton in 1854. A more general premium had become established by 1861, when an extra 10 shillings per ton was given to the first clipper arriving in London, being written into the bills of lading of all the ships loading in China at the beginning of the tea season.

A fast sailing clipper would usually obtain a higher rate of freight than other vessels. So the passage time of ships was important for negotiating the price paid to carry their next cargo. The first identifiable ship to carry a tea cargo with an increased freight based on her performance record was the American China packet Oriental, receiving £2 10 shillings per ton more than any other vessel loading that year. (The normal rate of freight varied between about £3 10s and £5 10s per ton during the 1860s.) When the premium ceased to be offered to clippers after 1866, clippers still competed for the ability to negotiate a better price for their next tea passage.

== History ==
The main commodity, which promised considerable profits to merchants, was Chinese tea. Carried on old ships, it sometimes stayed on the road for 12 months, damp and saturated with the smells of the hold, moldy and rotten, because of which it lost quality and its price fell.

In 1834, the East India Company lost its monopoly on trade with China. In the years immediately after this, the independent British tea merchants used ships called Blackwall frigates for China trade. These were smaller versions of the East Indiaman that had been used during the monopoly. As well, some ships were built with finer lines (to achieve faster voyages) during the second half of the 1830s (Note: the most notable of which was John O'Gaunt) or were transferred from other routes, (Note: e.g. Bonanza, owned by Brocklebank) having characteristics of clippers.

The conclusion of the First Opium War in 1842 resulted in the imposition on China of five treaty ports, giving British merchants better access to Chinese trade. By 1843, these benefits had also been extended to American ships. American merchants built China packets to carry tea back to the United States.

In 1849, the Navigation Acts were repealed, based on the principle of free trade. The carriage of tea from China to the United Kingdom was therefore no longer restricted to British vessels, so American ships could now take cargoes to London. In 1850, the American China packet, Oriental made a record-breaking outward passage of 81 days from New York to Hong Kong. British merchants immediately contracted her to carry tea to London, paying a very favourable £6 per ton (compared to the usual £4 per ton of 50 cu ft (1.4 m^{3}) offered to British ships (Note: The "ton" used in the bills of lading of British and American ships was a measure of volume. At this time, the British ton was 50 cu ft and the American ton 40 cu ft.)). She made the trip from Whampoa to London in 99 days. This produced comment in the British press who managed to take some comfort from the British clipper John Bunyan, earlier in the year, sailing from Shanghai to Deal in 101 days and London in 102. This happened at the end of the previous tea season. It was not a fair comparison as the British ship had benefitted from the more favourable monsoon at that time of the year.

In 1851, from Hood's Scottish Shipyard in Aberdeen (Great Britain, Scotland), clippers went after the Americans: «Stornaway» and «Cryselight». In 1852, the clipper «Challenger» came off Green's shipyard in Blackwall, built according to drawings developed on the basis of measurements from the Oriental.

«Hound Dogs of the Ocean» is the nickname in British Isles for clipper ships that delivered cargo from China in three to four months

In 1856, the War with China began.

Since 1860, the British have not chartered American clippers. The clipper «Flying Cloud» was the last American ship to bring tea to London. Since 1859, when 11 clippers left Chinese ports at the same time, tea races began to be held regularly.

Between May 26 and May 28, 1866, 16 clippers launched from the raid of the city of Fuzhou (China). After a long journey, September 5 clipper ships: Taiping and Ariel with a difference of 10 minutes at the mouth of the Thames took on board the pilots. There was a lot of hype in the press about this, and the owners of Taiping, having received the award, shared it with the owners of Ariel. And the captain of the Taiping shared his personal bonus with the captain of the Ariel.

The tea races attracted public attention at the time and were widely publicized in newspapers.

=== Partial list of race participants ===
Vessel name	1859	1861	1866	1867	1868	1869	1870	1871	1872
Ariel			2		1	x		x	lost
Black Prince			x	x					
Zaiba	x			x					
Cutty Sark							x	3	last
Leander						x	3		
Leila					x	x	1		
Serica			3	x	x	x	x		
Spindrift					2	x			
Sir Lancelot				x	3	1			x
Taeping			1		x	x	x	x	
Taitsing			x	x			last		2
Titania					x	3	x	1	x
Fiery Cross	x	1	x						
Thermopylae						2	x	2	3
Folken		x	x			x	x		1
Forward Ho							x	last	
Flying Spur		x	x						
Chinaman			x	x					
Challenger					last	last			
Ellen Roger	x	x							
Yangtze			x	x	x				
Total participated	5	5	16	17	12	14	14	8	8

A clipper is not in the table if he participated in less than two races
x — Participated
«n» — place
lost — The «Ariel» was lost at sea during the next «tea race» and nothing is known about her fate or the crew.

Cutty Sark is the only (accidentally) three-masted composite tea clipper that has survived to this day, and therefore the world's most famous representative of the galaxy of sailing clippers, the Hounds of the Ocean. In proportions, design and size, the ship is close to the unsurpassed racer — the clipper Thermopylae. Clipper «Cutty Sark» was built in 1869 at the Scottish shipyard «Linton & Scott» by special order of the shipowner John Willis, to participate in tea races. The length of this three-masted vessel with 29 main sails was 64.8 m, beam 11.0 m, draft 6.4 m. The Cutty Sark holds the 24-hour record of 363 miles, average ship speed (according to some reports 17.5 knots).

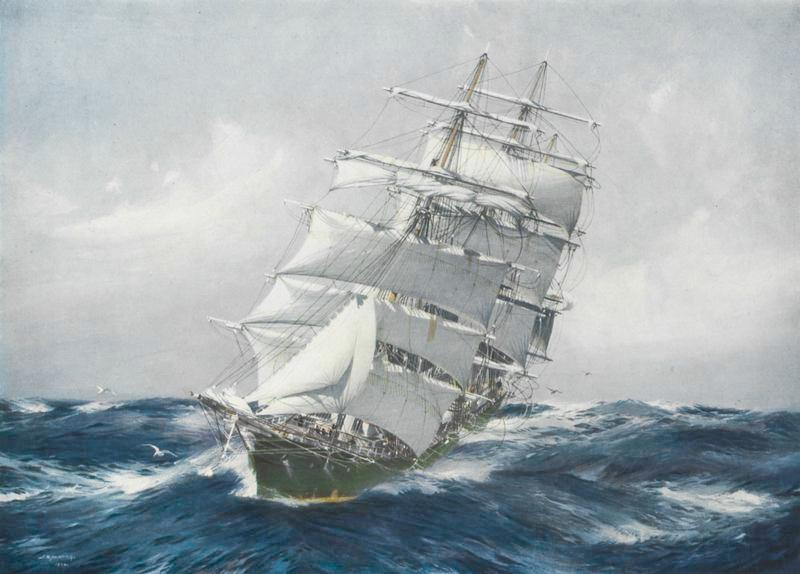
Thermopylae, a tea clipper built in 1868

Since 1870, Cutty Sark has been operated on the tea line, but the results shown are rated as average. The clipper's highest achievement was third place in the race 1871, when the Cutty Sark only let the legendary hounds ahead — «Titania» and «Thermopylae».

=== Sunset ===
In 1860, the steamship 'Scotland' made its first voyage from Shanghai to Hankou.
In 1863, the steamer Robert Low brought cargo from Hankow to London, most of which was tea.
In 1866, SS Agamemnon travelled from Liverpool to Shanghai in 80 days and back in 86 days. Her sister ships, Ajax and Achilles were launched in 1866 and 1867 respectively. (Ocean Steam Company)
In 1869, the Suez Canal was opened, and the path for steamships was significantly reduced. In 1887, from Bombay to London by steamboat took 16.5 days, from Melbourne — 35 days. They began to come first, to carry the best cargo, to get more profit. Large sailboats had to go to other routes.

== Sources ==
- Campbell, George Frederick (1954). China Tea Clippers. A. Coles.
- Skrjagin, L. N. (2015). Золотой Век Паруса (корабли Семи морей) [The Golden Age of Sail (Ships of the Seven Seas)]. Modelist-Konstruktor. On earth, in the heavens and on the sea (in Russian) (9): 19–24.
