= Lahloo (clipper) =

British tea clipper

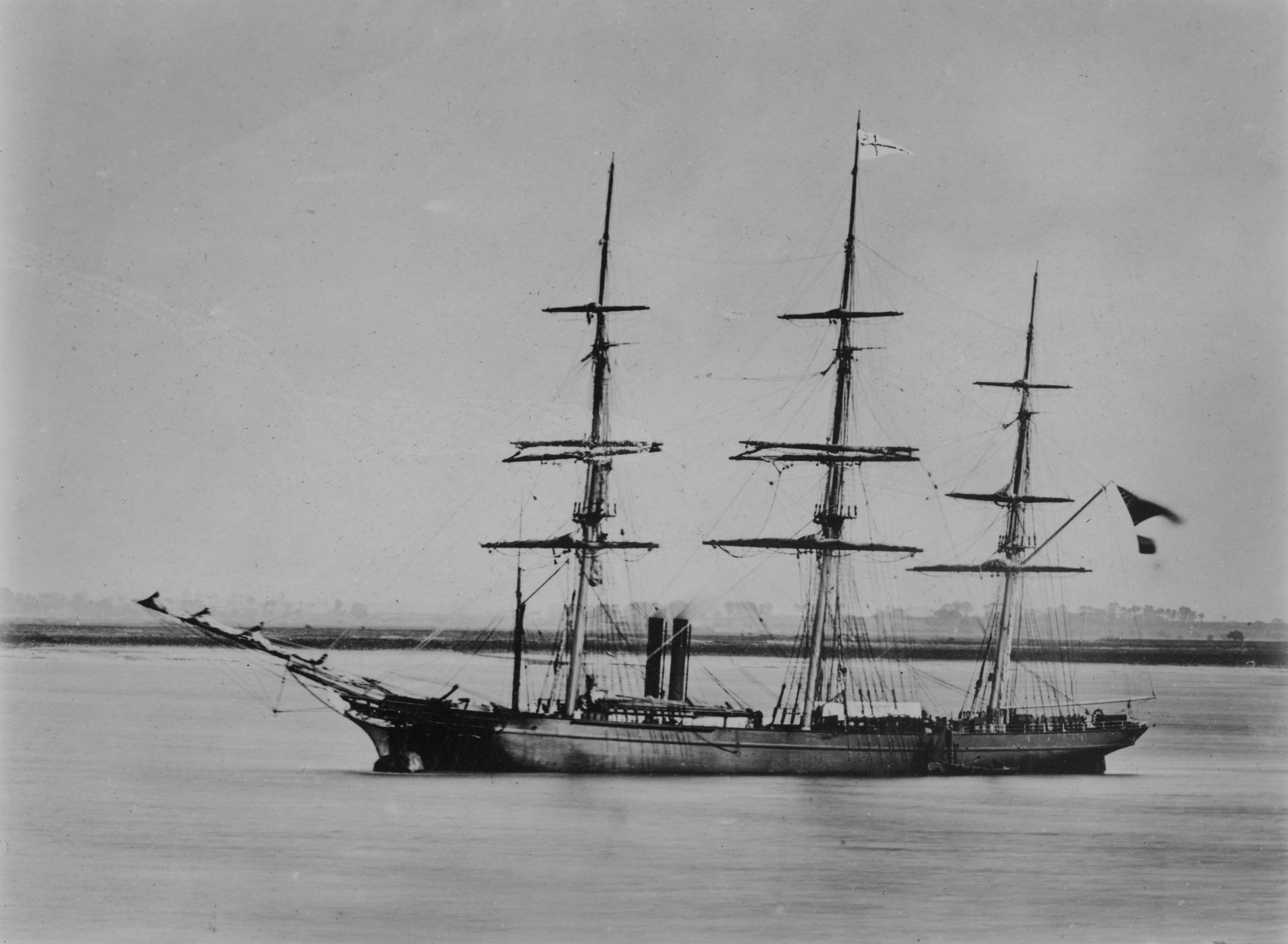
- Lahloo

History

United Kingdom
- Name: Lahloo
- Owner: James Findlay
- Builder: Robert Steele & Co., Greenock, for Alexander Rodger, Glasgow
- Launched: 23 July 1867
- Fate: Lost Sandalwood Island, 30 or 31 July 1872 16°35′S 179°11′E

General characteristics
- Tons burthen: 799 tons, 985 83/94 tons OM
- Length: 191 ft. 6 in.
- Beam: 32 ft. 9 in.
- Draught: 19 ft. 9 in.

Lahloo was a British tea clipper known for winning the Tea Race of 1870, and finishing second in the Tea Race of 1871. She sailed from Fuzhou to London with over a million pounds (500 tons) of tea in 1868.

== Construction ==
Lahloo was of the same class and sharpness as Ariel, "with more deadrise and tumblehome and a slightly fuller run." She was designed by William Steele, had a composite hull, and carried Cunningham's roller-reefing topsails.

== Voyages ==
- Fuzhou to London
  - 101 days, 1868
  - 101 days, 1869 (via the "Eastern Passage" out of the China Sea) (Note: The sailing route from the China tea ports to London is across the China Sea, then the Indian Ocean, passing Mauritius, rounding the southern tip of Africa into the Atlantic, generally passing to the west of the Azores before turning towards the English Channel. The major variations were in the China Sea, with different strategies to pick up favourable winds. A direct route to the Indian Ocean is through the Sunda Strait. Circumstances (such as a strong south-westerly wind immediately on departure) or a cautious captain may dictate use of the "Eastern Passage". This meant heading out into the Pacific Ocean, going down the eastern coast of Formosa (Taiwan) and the Philippines, then through the Gillolo Strait, Pitt Passage, and the Ombai Strait into the Indian Ocean. This longer route did not necessarily result in a slow passage: Sir Lancelot took 99 days from Woosung (Wusong) to London by this route in 1867. In 1869, many of the clippers took the Eastern route home.)
  - 111 days, 1871
- London to Shanghai
  - 98 days (95 days pilot to pilot), 1869

== Won the Tea Race of 1870 ==
"The race of 1870 from Foo-chow to London was won by the Lahloo in 97 days, the other vessels being: the Windhover, 100 days; Sir Launcelot, 102 days; Leander, 103 days; Thermopylae, 106 days."

== Finished second in the Tea Race of 1871 ==
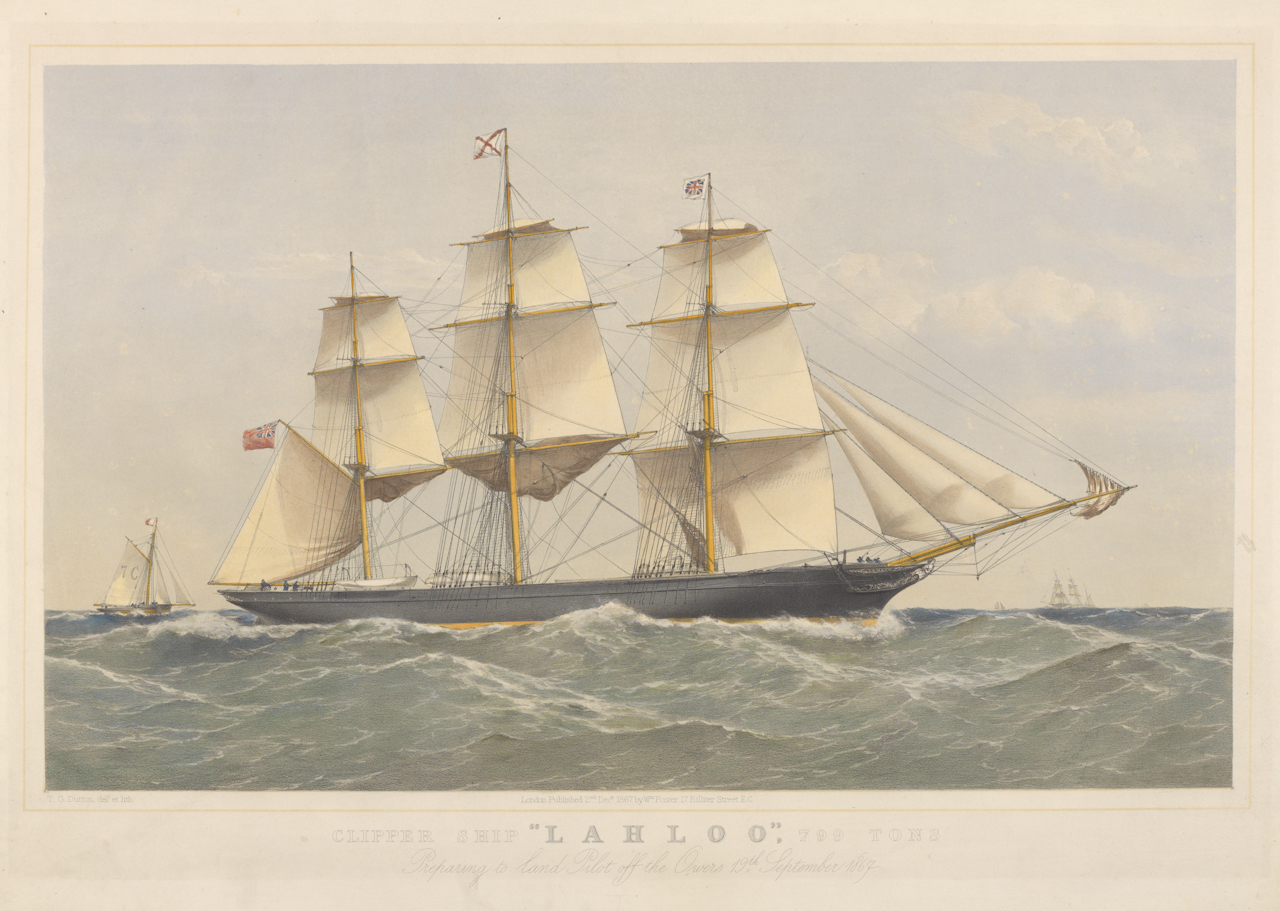
Lahloo, preparing to land a pilot off the Owers, 19 September 1867

"In 1871 the Titania won in 93 days; the Lahloo, 111 days, from Foo-chow to London; and from Shanghai to London the Thermopylae was 106 days; Cutty Sark, 110 days, and Forward Ho, 118 days. This was about the last of the tea clipper racing, for the combined competition of steam and the Suez Canal proved too powerful for sail. No more tea clippers were built after 1869; by degrees these beautiful vessels were driven into other trades; and so the Clipper Ship Era drifted into history."

== Sailing performance ==
According to Lubbock, the tea clippers Lahloo, Fiery Cross, Taeping and Serica performed at their best in light breezes, as they were all rigged with single topsails. The photograph at the beginning of this article shows Lahloo rigged with double topsails. The photograph is believed to date from the early 1870s – she was built with single topsails and it is not clear when the change was made.

== Loss of the ship ==
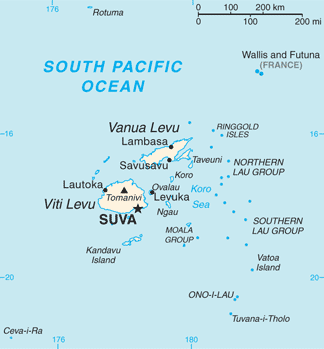
Map of Sandalwood Island, where Lahloo was wrecked

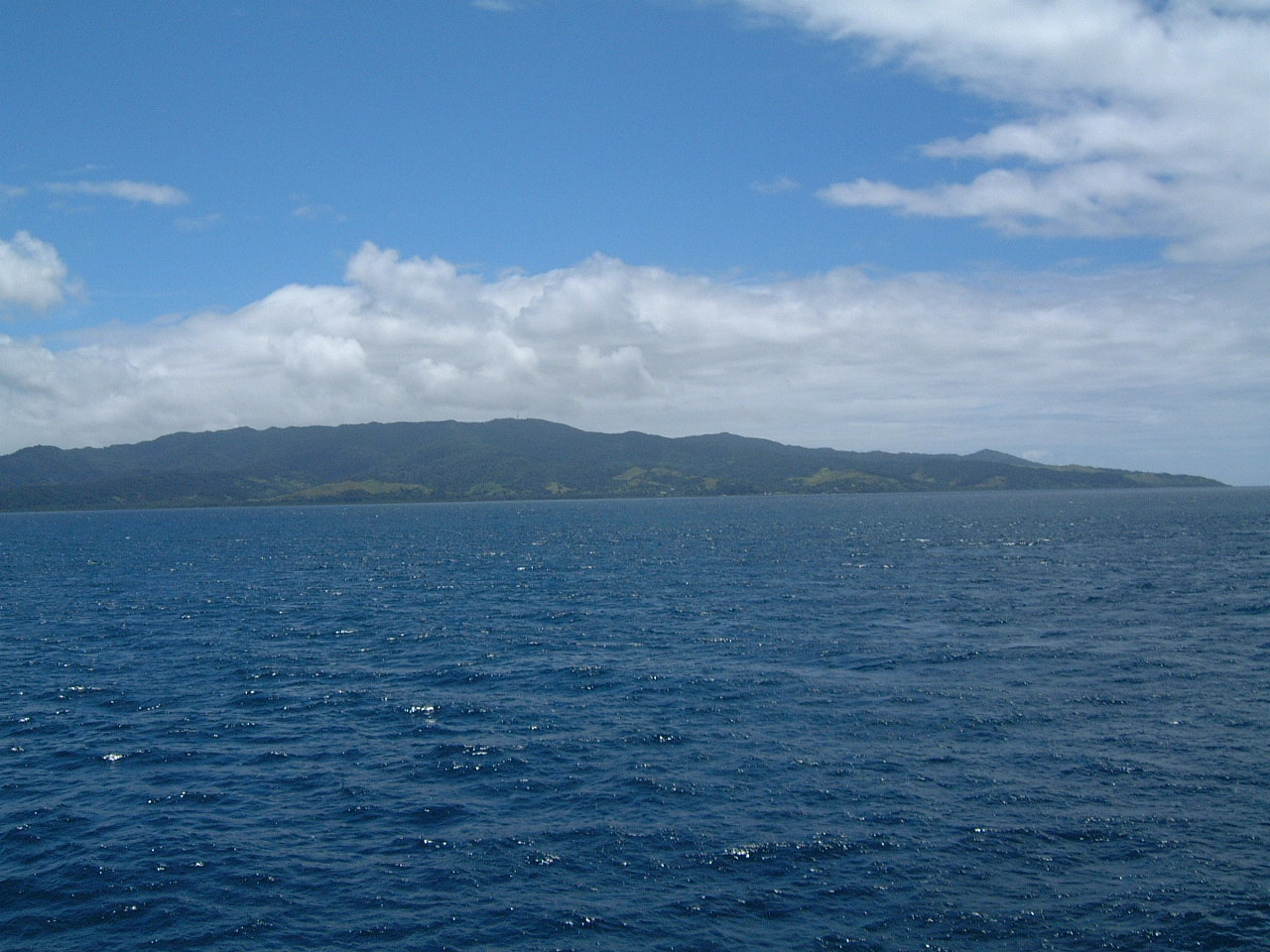
Sandalwood Island, now called Vanua Levu

Lahloo was wrecked on Sandalwood Island, Sunda Islands, on 31 July 1872 whilst on a voyage from Shanghai to London with tea. Her crew survived.
