= Erl King =

Erl King may refer to:

- SS Erl King (1865), a British auxiliary steam ship
- Erlking, a spirit in German folklore
- "Der Erlkönig" ("The Erl-King"), a 1782 poem by Goethe set to music by many composers, most notably Schubert
- The Erl-King (novel), of 1970 by Michel Tournier
