= Flying Spur (clipper) =

1860 British tea clipper

History

United Kingdom
- Name: Flying Spur
- Owner: Jardine, Matheson & Co.
- Builder: Alexander Hall & Sons, Aberdeen
- Cost: £13.787
- Launched: 1860
- Out of service: 1881
- Fate: Wrecked on Martin Vas, North Rock, in the South Atlantic.

General characteristics
- Class & type: Extreme clipper
- Tons burthen: 732
- Length: 184 ft (56 m)
- Beam: 31 ft 4 in (9.55 m)
- Draught: 19 ft 4 in (5.89 m)

Flying Spur was a British tea clipper, built of teak and greenheart in 1860.

== Voyages in the tea trade ==
For 20 years, Flying Spur sailed with cargoes of tea between London and the Chinese tea ports such as Fuzhou, with voyages to Canton, China; Nagasaki, Japan. As a tea clipper, she had a crew of 36.

Flying Spur was one of the 16 clippers waiting to load tea in Fuzhou in May 1866. These ships were judged to be among the fastest in the tea clipper fleet, and so likely to give a good performance in that year's tea race - the informal contest to be the first ship to dock with the new crop of tea. The first 5 had finished loading and sailed over the period 28 May to 31 May. They were the main contenders in the Great Tea Race of 1866 - a contest with a very close finish. Flying Spur did not get away until 5 Jun and so missed the opportunity to be involved.

Flying Spur made the fourth fastest passage back from China in 1867, with a time of 116 days, carrying 49,710 pounds of tea. First in the race was Ariel, with a time of 102 days, carrying 1,283,000 pounds of tea.

== Loss ==
On 13 February 1881, Flying Spur "was wrecked on Martin Vas, North Rock, in the South Atlantic Ocean while carrying a cargo of coal and a crew of 18 and a number of passengers. All on board were rescued by the French barque Château Lafitte. Flying Spur was on a voyage from Liverpool, Lancashire to Madras, India.

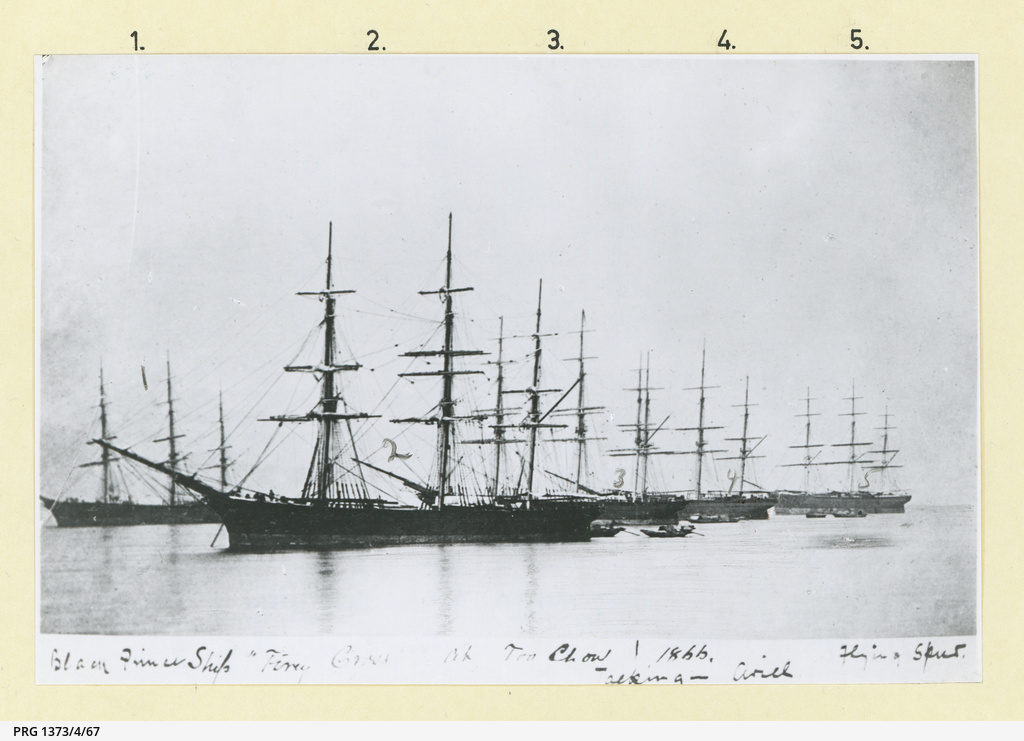
Black Prince, Fiery Cross, Taeping, Ariel and Flying Spur at Fuzhou in 1866

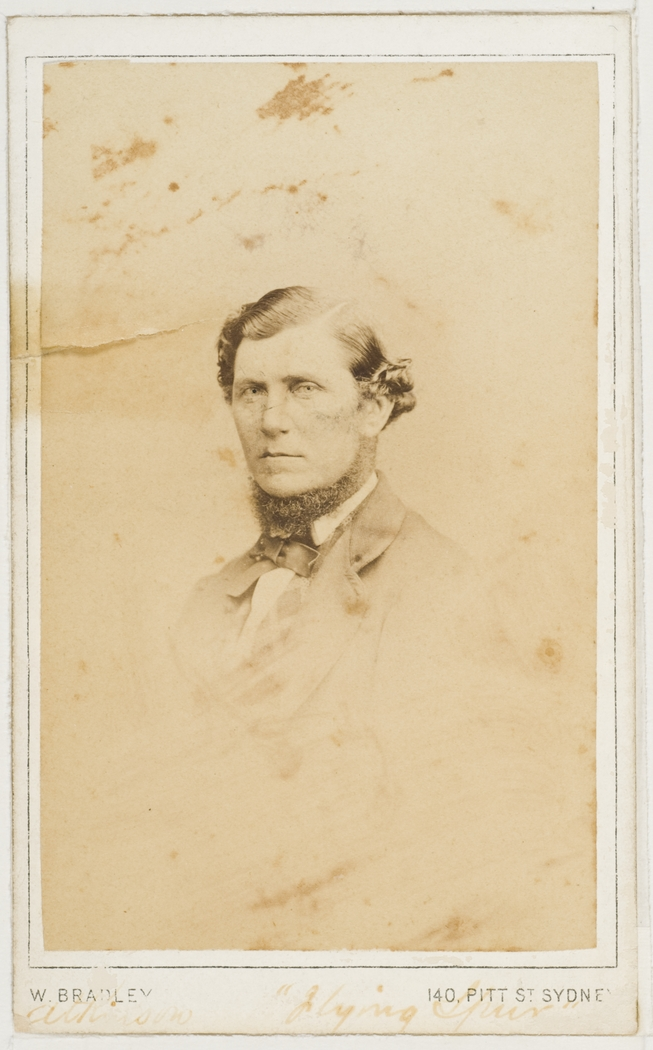
William B. Atkinson, captain of Flying Spur, ca. 1870
