= Great Tea Race of 1866 =

Sailing ship race from China to London

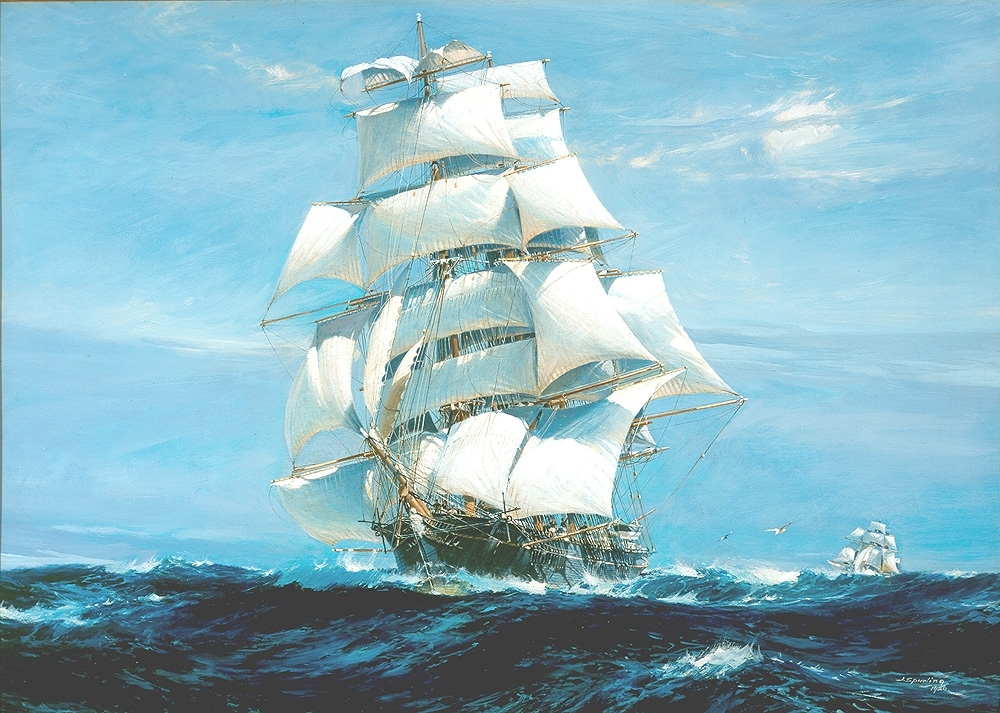
Ariel and Taeping, by Jack Spurling

In the middle third of the 19th century, the clippers which carried cargoes of tea from China to Britain would compete in informal races to be first ship to dock in London with the new crop of each season. The Great Tea Race of 1866 was keenly followed in the press, with an extremely close finish. Taeping docked 28 minutes before Ariel – after a passage of more than 14,000 miles. Ariel had been ahead when the ships were taken in tow by steam tugs off Deal, but after waiting for the tide at Gravesend the deciding factor was the height of tide at which one could enter the different docks used by each ship. The third finisher, Serica, docked an hour and 15 minutes after Ariel. These three ships had left China on the same tide and arrived at London 99 days later to dock on the same tide. The next to arrive, 28 hours later, was Fiery Cross, followed, the next day, by Taitsing.

Given the close finish, and fearing that the consignees might find reason to avoid payment, the prize, or "premium", was claimed by Taeping but shared between them and Ariel, by agreement of their agents and owners. 1866 was the last time that a premium was written into the bill of lading of a tea clipper for docking in London with the first of the new crop. Though clippers raced with cargoes of tea for a few more years, the only commercial advantage was in the reputation as a fast ship, thereby securing a better rate of freight in the future.

Whilst the outcome thrilled its followers, it was clear to some that the days of the tea clipper were numbered. The auxiliary steamer Erl King had sailed from Fuzhou (Foochow) 8 days after Ariel, carrying both passengers and a cargo of tea. She arrived in London 15 days before the sailing ships. The SS Agamemnon, a much more fuel efficient ship than her contemporaries, had just made the fastest ever outward passage to China of 65 days and was on her way to London with a cargo of tea that was two or three times larger than a clipper could carry. The Suez Canal was under construction (and opened in 1869). This would give a much shorter route (a reduction of about 3,250 nautical miles (6,020 km; 3,740 mi) or nearly a quarter less distance), so favouring the steamships, as the Canal was not a practical option for sailing vessels.

== Background ==
Tea was introduced from China to Europe in the 17th century, but, as a luxury item, was not transported in significant quantities until the 19th century. China was the main centre of production until late in the 19th century. The British East India Company's monopoly of the tea trade from China to Britain ceased in 1834. This opening to competition meant that faster ships were needed, as merchants vied to be first in the market with each new crop of tea. Unlike the slower East Indiamen that had carried tea during that company's monopoly, the tea clippers were designed for speed. Those that had achieved particularly fast passages could usually command a higher freight (the price paid to transport the cargo) than others. Tea wholesalers would mention in advertisements which ship had carried the different batches being sold. It was often the case that tea that was loaded early in China was of somewhat poorer quality than that which became available a few weeks later in the season. Yet this was what was carried by the first ships home and sold to the public with the cachet of a fast passage.

The first cargo of tea landed could be very profitable for tea merchants, so they introduced incentives. In 1854, Vision had a premium of an extra £1 per ton included in her bill of lading, payable if she was the first to dock. In 1855 Maury and Lord of the Isles raced for a premium of £1 per ton, with the latter the winner through getting a better tug to get up-river. Note that the premium did not simply reward the fastest passage, since rapid loading of a cargo and a prompt departure were important factors. In 1861, the consignees offered a premium of 10s per ton to the first ship to dock in London. This was won by the Fiery Cross, who also went on to win in 1862, 1863 and 1865.

At this time, anyone with a particular interest in shipping or business could easily follow the performance of tea clippers through the "Shipping Intelligence" column of their newspaper — and trade in tea was discussed in the commodities section of the business column. The "news" sections of newspapers started to comment on the first ship to dock from 1857. By 1866, newspaper interest was at its height, with speculation, updates and detailed reports. Many bets were placed on the outcome of the race, in London, Hong Kong, and the ports of Britain, and by the captains and crews of the vessels involved.

== Contenders ==
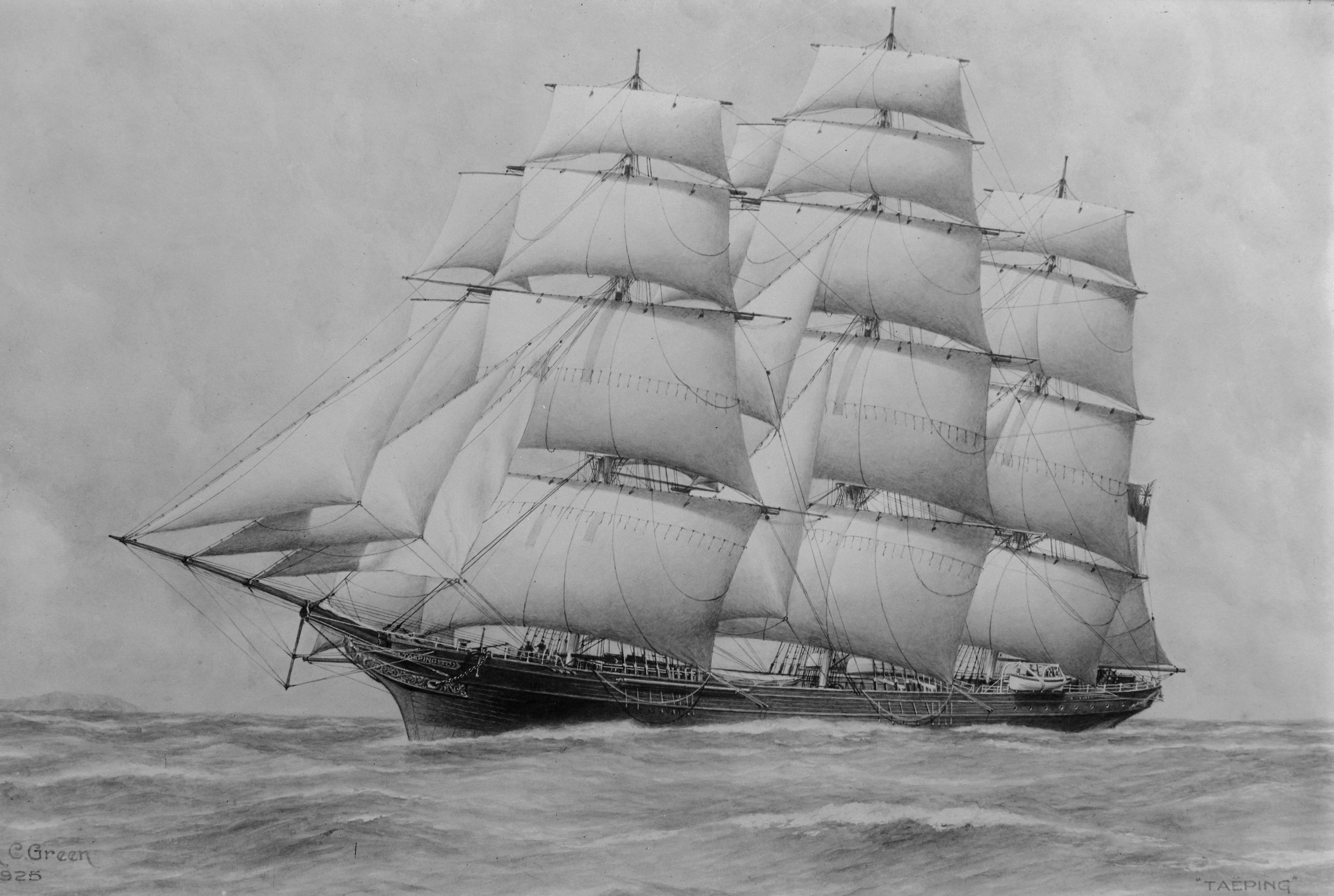
Taeping

The tea trade from China was a large undertaking. MacGregor lists 57 ships sailing in the 1866-67 tea season, with a clear caveat that not every ship is listed – only the ones that he had researched. Over the season, these sailed from several ports: Fuzhou, Hankou (Hankow), Shanghai, Wusong (Woosung), Canton and Hong Kong. Most departure dates stretch from the end of May 1866 through to February 1867. In May 1866, 16 of the best clippers had assembled at the Pagoda Anchorage on the Min River, downriver from Fuzhou. The quickest ships, as judged by the agents based in China, would be loaded first. However, it was not always the fastest that sailed first – much depended on the tonnage of the vessel and the standing and influence of the local agent.

The front runners of the 1866 Tea Race were:

- Ariel, launched in 1865. She was thought to be the fastest of her day, being designed for excellent performance in light winds. The downside to this was that in a strong gale, sail had to be reduced rapidly or the ship even hove to, as her extreme lines left her susceptible to being pooped or, if going to windward, damage would be caused by waves sweeping the deck. She was of composite construction (wooden planking on an iron framework), built at the yard of Robert Steele & Company in Greenock on the Clyde. She carried 100 tons of fixed iron ballast, moulded to fit low in the hull and a further 20 tons of moveable iron ballast. This gives an indication of the "yacht like" nature of her design.
- Fiery Cross had been the first tea clipper home in 1861, 1862, 1863 and 1865. As a slightly older ship, built in 1860, she predated the widespread acceptance of composite construction, so was built of wood. Nevertheless, she was full of the latest technology; for example steel masts and Cunningham's patent roller reefing topsails and t'gallants.
- Serica, launched in 1863, was another ship built by Robert Steele & Company, and the penultimate wooden clipper from that yard before they moved to composite construction. She was the first ship home from China in 1864, and was closely beaten (through lack of a tug) by Fiery Cross in 1865.
- Taitsing was another Clyde-built ship, of composite construction. She was launched from the yard of Charles Connell & Co. of Glasgow in 1865, so was on her first trip to China.
- Taeping was the first composite ship built by Robert Steele & Co (the third from this yard out of the five ships listed here), being launched in 1863. On her maiden voyage she was dismasted in a typhoon off Formosa, losing her foremast and main and mizzen topmasts. After repairs in Amoy, she then made a remarkably fast passage of 89 days to London.

== Loading ==
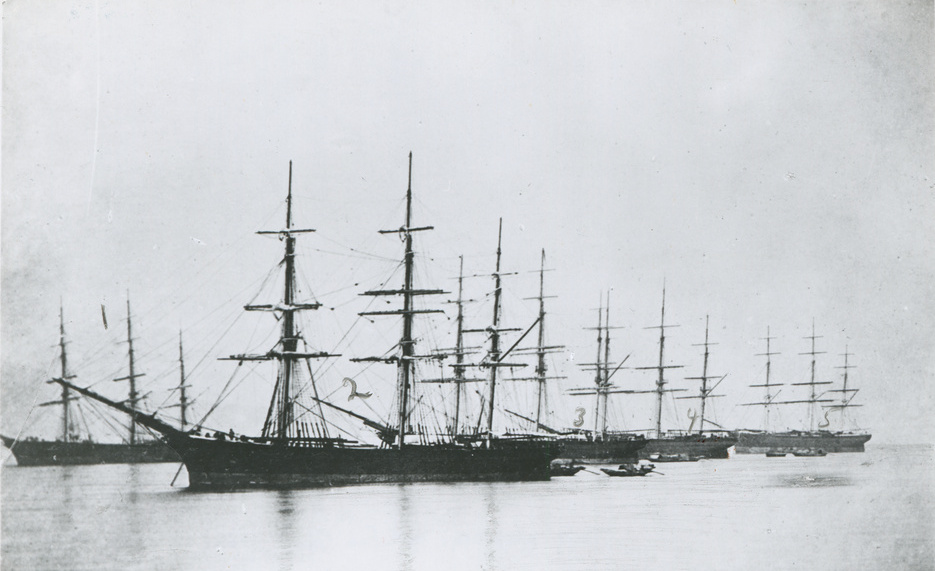
The Pagoda Anchorage, Fuzhou, in 1866. The tea clippers lined up awaiting their cargo. Pictured from left to right: The 'Black Prince', 'Fiery Cross', 'Taitsing', 'Taeping', and 'Flying Spur'

The race was not only a test of sailing, but also of efficient management at the port of departure. Each ship needed to be ready to receive her cargo. The hold was prepared by spreading a layer of clean shingle across the bottom to act as ballast. This was additional to the iron ballast carried by these extreme clippers. Between 150 and 200 tons of shingle was needed, and it was levelled to follow the curve of the deck above, at a distance precisely measured to be an exact number of tea chests. The tea arrived in lighters called "chop boats" (taking their name from the identifying marks on each batch of tea they carried). Lower value chests were loaded first as a layer across the ballast, with some shingle being packed between the chests and side of the hold. Then the main cargo was loaded in further layers, being carefully packed in with dunnage by the excellent Chinese stevedores.

Despite the care taken, loading could be done quickly. In the 1850s, a ship loaded 8,000 chests of tea and 1,141 bales of silk in 17 hours work spread over two days.

On 24 May, the first lighters arrived with tea, packed in chests, ready for loading. On Ariel, the first layer of 391 chests and 200 half-chests were loaded. By 27 May, she had 16 lighters alongside, with the Chinese stevedores working round the clock to stow the main part of the cargo. At 2 pm on the 28th, the job was done, giving a total of 1,230,900 lbs of tea. Ariel was first to complete loading. At 5 pm, she unmoored and moved down-river to anchor for the night, ready for an early start.

The same task was underway on other ships in the anchorage. Fiery Cross was next to finish, some 12 hours later, loading 854,236 lbs. Her master, Captain Robinson, in his haste to sail, neglected to complete his paperwork or sign his bills of lading – to the fury of Captain Innes of Serica. Taeping and Serica were able to get away together, having loaded 1,108,700 lbs and 954,236 lbs respectively. Taitsing, with 1,093,130 lbs, was a day behind.

== To sea ==
Ariel started to raise her anchor at 5 am on the 29th and with the paddle steamer Island Queen towing alongside, headed down-river for the sea. The river pilot left and the tug was sent ahead to tow. The fast flowing River Min then presented problems for the under-powered tug as they met eddies and Ariel had to anchor to regain control of the situation. By this time it was low tide. With a mean draft of 18 ft 5.5 ins., there was not enough water for her to get over the bar. Captain Keay's frustration was increased by Fiery Cross, with a more powerful tug and drawing significantly less, towing past her and getting out to sea. Then the weather closed in: poor visibility preventing safe departure on the next tide. On the morning of the 30th, Ariel finally got to sea, but with Taeping and Serica only a few minutes behind and Fiery Cross 14 hours ahead. In a final delay, Ariel could not leave her pilot on Island Queen, as the tug's boat capsized on launching (the boat crew eventually being rescued) – so a pilot boat had to be summoned.

Three of the front runners now had as level a start in the race as a spectator could hope for. There was a moderate northeast wind and the course set was "South by East a half East" (163 degrees on a modern compass). All three had set their main skysails and fore topmast and lower stunsails. Ariel was slowly over-hauling the other two ships, but then the weather closed in and they lost sight of each other, racing on unseen in the rain.

== Newspaper reports ==
News reports of the start appeared in British newspapers from 11 June, when The Pall Mall Gazette carried a list of the first four starters, and names of the rest of the ships waiting to sail. The only additional information was that "the betting at Hong Kong runs very high". This was copied widely in other newspapers. From the timing of publication, one must presume that this news was delivered using the overland telegraph route from Galle in Sri Lanka.

News by mail was reported on 10 August, giving start dates and the dates of passing Anjer, on the southern side of the Straits of Sunda.

The next reports were of Ariel and Taeping heading up the English Channel, followed by very many reports of the finish in varying degrees of detail.

== Route ==
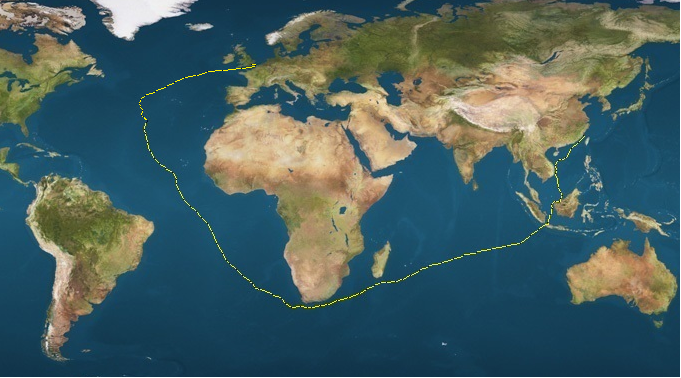
Ariel's homeward passage, 1866

The sailing route from the China tea ports to London is across the China Sea, then the Indian Ocean, passing Mauritius, rounding the southern tip of Africa into the Atlantic, generally passing to the west of the Azores before turning towards the English Channel. The major variations were in the China Sea, with different strategies to pick up favourable winds. A direct route to the Indian Ocean is through the Sunda Strait. Circumstances (such as a strong south-westerly wind immediately on departure) or a cautious captain may dictate use of the "Eastern Passage". This meant heading out into the Pacific Ocean, going down the eastern coast of Formosa (Taiwan) and the Philippines, then through the Gillolo Strait, Pitt Passage, and the Ombai Strait into the Indian Ocean. This longer route did not necessarily result in a slow passage: Sir Lancelot took 99 days from Wusong to London by this route in 1867.

The distance from Fuzhou to London is described as being "over 14,000 miles" by MacGregor. Ariel logged about 15,800 nautical miles from China to London on her 1866 passage.

The start of the tea season was during the early stages of the South-West monsoon in the China Sea, so head winds would be experienced, and very light or variable winds together with sudden squalls. Many captains sailing for the Sunda Strait therefore chose to head westward to the coast of Annam (present day Vietnam) to pick up land breezes. This involved tacking at the most favourable moment to be close inshore for the start of the land breeze, often in the middle of the night. Crossing to the Annam coast meant passing the Paracels, an area of low-lying islands and reefs which presented obvious dangers. From the coast of Annam, the usual route was to head south to the coast of Borneo, again to take advantage of land and sea breezes.

The crossing of the China Sea frequently decided the overall passage time to London. It also had notable hazards, particularly as accurate, fully surveyed charts did not exist at this time.

The five ships leading the 1866 race all headed for the Sunda Strait, sailing past the Paracels, down the coast of Annam and then south to Borneo, bound for Anjer, on the southern side of the Sunda Strait.

== On passage ==
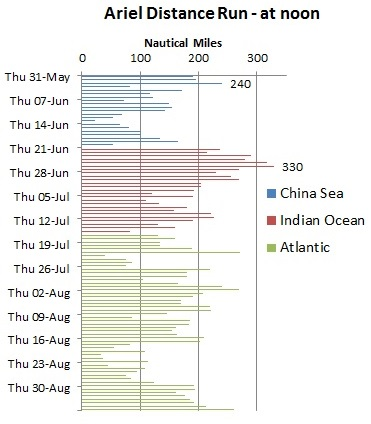

Before Ariel had even crossed the bar of the Min River, Captain Keay had the crew working on the fore and aft trim of the ship, a process that continued for over two weeks. Adjustments were needed later in the voyage as stores and water were used. The loaded draft of 18 feet 8 inches forward and 18 feet 3 inches aft was eventually altered to 18 feet 1 inch forward and 18 feet 3 inches aft by moving some of the cargo into the after cabin, and generally moving aft any heavy movable material such as hawsers, casks of salt pork, and spare spars. This improved the steering and general sailing performance. Adjusting the trim went on against the continual background of sail trimming, setting and taking in sails, maintenance work and repairs.

In the early part of the race, Ariel sighted Taeping on 2 June, whilst following the coast of Annam (modern Vietnam) – and again on the 9th and 10th, approaching the coast of Borneo, about 760 NM to the south of the previous sighting. On the 10th Taeping, about 4 miles behind, signalled that they had passed Fiery Cross on the 8th. This put Ariel ahead.

As the ships progressed across the Indian Ocean and around the southern tip of Africa, the race became closer, the lead shifting between the first three. Serica made up a lot of lost ground by the time they were passing St Helena.

The next sighting between any of the participants was on 9 August, when Taeping and Fiery Cross exchanged signals some 12° north of the Equator, in the Atlantic. Winds were light and variable, so they remained in company until 27 August, when a breeze sprang up which carried Taeping out of sight in four or five hours, whilst Fiery Cross suffered the enormous misfortune to remain becalmed for another 24 hours.

The distance between the five ships continued to reduce as they reached the Azores. Ariel, Fiery Cross, Taeping and Serica all passed Flores on 29 August. Taitsing was 48 hours behind them. The next waypoint was entry into the English Channel.

== Final stages ==
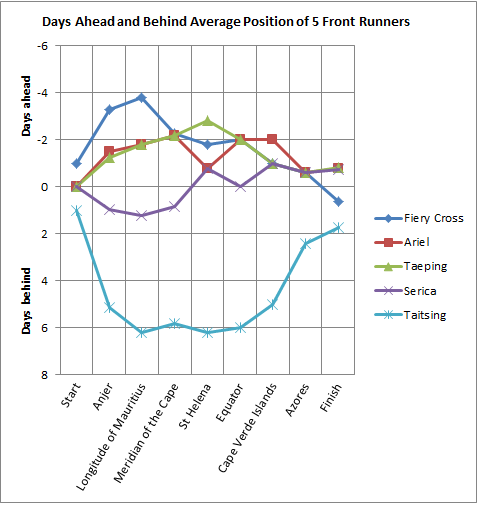
Tea Race 1866 line chart of relative positions

Ariel sighted the Bishop Light at 1:30 am on 5 September 1866. With all possible sail set, she sped toward the mouth of the English Channel. At daybreak, another ship was seen on the starboard quarter, also carrying every stitch of canvas that she could. Captain Keay of Ariel later said "Instinct told me that it was the Taeping", and he was right. A strong west-southwesterly wind carried these two ships up the channel at 14 knots. The Lizard was abeam at 8:00 am and Start Point at noon. The two ships were off Portland towards 6:00 pm and St. Catherine's Point was due north at 7:25 pm. Beachy Head was abeam just after midnight. The relative positions of the two ships barely shifted all this while – Ariel kept her lead.

At 3:00 am on the 6th, Ariel was approaching Dungeness, so started signalling for a pilot. At 4:00 am she hove to and continued to signal with flares and rockets. Taeping, also signalling for a pilot, was coming up fast and was close astern of Ariel at 5:00 am. There was no sign that Taeping would heave to, so Captain Keay ordered Ariel's sails to be filled to keep ahead of the other ship, to be sure of getting the first pilot. On Taeping, Captain MacKinnon conceded and also hove to.

At 5:55 am, the pilot arrived on board Ariel. He saluted Captain Keay with congratulations at being the first ship from China that season. He got the reply "Yes, and what is that to the westward? We have not room to boast yet." At 6:00 am, both ships were under way, heading for South Foreland. Despite Taeping resorting to setting some stunsails, Ariel was about a mile ahead. Then both ships signalled for a tug. Here luck was with Taeping, as the better tug put a towline aboard her, so she took the lead as they were towed round the coastline of Kent and into the Thames.

Taeping arrived at Gravesend some 55 minutes before Ariel, but that gave her no advantage as both ships then had to wait for the tide to rise sufficiently. Ariel then had the shorter distance to go – arriving outside East India Dock gates at 9:00 pm, but the tide was still too low for the gates to open. Taeping carried on up-river to London Docks. Here, unlike the entrance to the East India Dock, there was an inner and outer set of gates. Taeping's shallower draft allowed her through the outer gates, then they topped up the lock from the dock basin. She passed through at 9:47 pm. Ariel entered East India Dock at 10:15 pm.

While Ariel and Taeping were racing up the English coast of the Channel, Serica had been speeding along the French side. She passed through the Downs at noon and just managed, at 11:30 pm, to get into the West India Dock before the lock gates were shut.

This meant that these three ships had left China on the same tide, sailed over 14,000 miles in a race lasting 99 days, then all docked in London on the same tide, with less than two hours between them.

Fiery Cross was not far behind the first three; she sighted the Isle of Wight at 10:00 am on 7 September but, on arriving in the Downs, was compelled to anchor because the wind had now risen to gale force. She docked in London at 8:00 am on 8 September. Taitsing arrived on the morning of 9 September.

== Compromise and the end of the premium ==
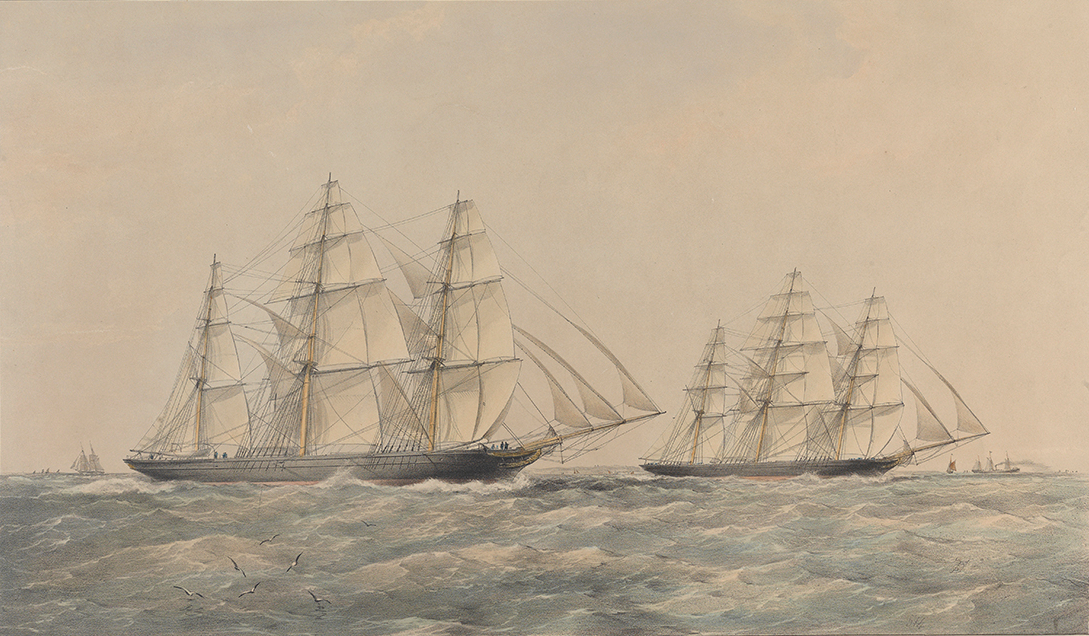
Taeping and Ariel racing up the Channel, by T. G. Dutton

The clippers that sailed at the beginning of the 1866/67 tea season had a premium of 10s per ton written into their bills of lading, payable, by the consignees, to the first ship to dock in London. This is additional to the ordinary rate of freight that had been negotiated – in the case of Ariel in 1866, that was £5 per ton. The "ton" used in these bills of lading was the "freight ton", a measurement of volume; British ships loading tea in China at this time used a ton of 50 cubic feet (compared with American ships which used a ton of 40 cubic feet).

Normally, the extra payment of the premium would be compensated for by the profits to be made by selling the first of the new crop of tea. In 1866, there was a problem – the first cargo of tea had arrived over two weeks earlier in the steam auxiliary ship Erl King, a ship that was not considered part of the race. The tea merchants were committed to a payment when their tea would sell at a loss. To add to this, the first two tea clippers had signalled off Deal early on the morning of 6 September, followed by a third (Serica) at 1:00 pm. These three ships would create a glut of new season tea, so prices were bound to fall further.

The owners and agents of Ariel and Taeping were well aware of the situation that the consignees were in. As soon as their ships had telegraphed from the Downs they became concerned that anything that might be considered a dead heat or a disputed result might lead the consignees to call the race void – there being no outright winner – and so not pay the premium for the first ship to dock. Therefore, they agreed that whichever ship docked first would claim and the other would not dispute the result in any way. In return, the two ships shared the premium between them, and also MacKinnon and Keay shared the £100 prize for the winning ship's captain. This is what happened, Taeping made the claim and shared the money equally with Ariel.

The premium payable to the first tea clipper to arrive in London was abandoned after the 1866 Tea Race.

== Beginning of the end for tea clippers ==
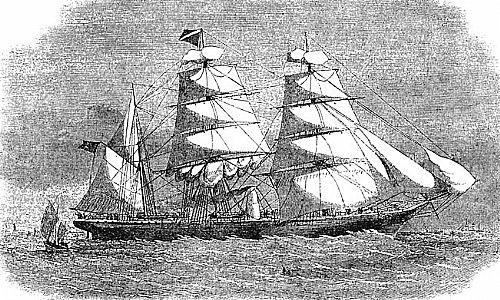
Auxiliary steamer Erl King

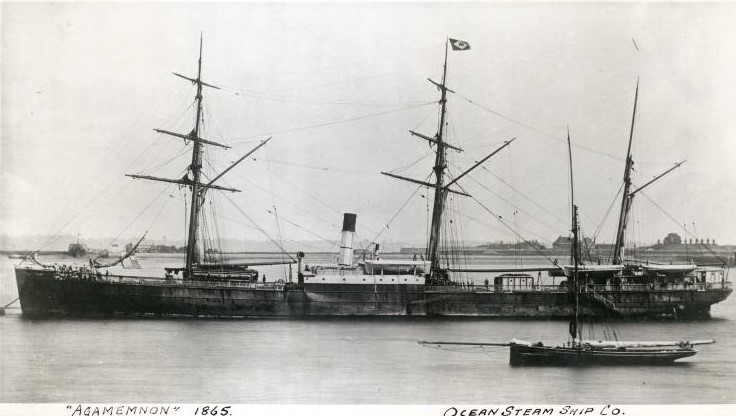
Agamemnon, the first steamer with sufficient fuel efficiency to make a reliable profit in trade to China

As Ariel, Fiery Cross and the other clippers left Fuzhou at the end of May 1866, the steam auxiliary Erl King was loading 1,108,100 pounds of tea; she sailed on 5 June, 7 days after Fiery Cross. She coaled at Mauritius on 27 June, 22 days later, already ahead of the clippers that had left before her, and arrived in London on 22 August, 78 days after sailing – taking 77 days on passage, plus one day of coaling. She was in London 15 days before the first of the clippers. Taeping, as noted above, took 99 days to get from China to London. Newspapers, particularly in Glasgow (where many steamships were built) and Liverpool commented that steam would soon take over carrying tea from China.

The same news reports also commented on SS Agamemnon, a true steamer, as opposed to an auxiliary like Erl King. Agamemnon had just completed a record outward passage of 65 days and was on her return trip with a very large cargo of tea. She consumed only 20 tons of coal a day at 10 knots, substantially better fuel economy than other contemporary steamships – a saving of between 23 and 14 tons per day. The confidence of her owners was such that, before proving the profitability of Agamemnon in service, they were building two sister ships, Achilles (1866) and Ajax (1867).

The opening of the Suez Canal in 1869 gave a distance saving of about 3,250 nautical miles (6,020 km; 3,740 mi) on the route from China to London. (Note: The distance by a modern shipping route calculator is 13,373 nautical miles (24,767 km; 15,389 mi) from London to Fuzhou via the Cape of Good Hope. Using the same calculator, a route through the Mediterranean and Suez Canal is 10,124 nautical miles (18,750 km; 11,650 mi). The difference is 3,249 nautical miles (6,017 km; 3,739 mi). A sailing vessel would take a longer route to obtain the best winds, so this comparison is only an approximation.) Whilst it was possible for a sailing vessel to take a tug through the canal, this was difficult and expensive. Furthermore, sailing conditions in the northern Red Sea were unsuited to the design of a tea clipper. So they still had to sail around Africa. When the tea clippers arrived in China in 1870, they found a big increase in the number of steamers, which were in high demand. The rate of freight to London that was given to steamers was nearly twice that paid to the sailing ships. Additionally, the insurance premium for a cargo of tea in a steamer was substantially cheaper than in a sailing vessel. So successful were the steamers using the Suez Canal that, in 1871, 45 were built in Clyde shipyards alone for Far Eastern trade. As their numbers on this route increased, clippers had to look elsewhere for their work. Costs had to be kept to a minimum – so fewer and less skilled crew were carried. Many ships had their rig reduced to barque so that a smaller crew was needed. The last race between tea clippers to catch public attention was between Thermopylae and Cutty Sark in 1872.

== Afterwards ==
Erl King was the first ship to carry a cargo of tea through the Suez Canal, arriving in London on 4 August 1870 after a passage of 61 days. She later served on the route to Australia and then on transatlantic routes. She was lost off the coast of Florida on 16 Dec 1891.

Captain MacKinnon of Taeping was taken ill with rheumatic fever on his next outward passage and was put ashore in South Africa. He died of complications whilst travelling home to Britain. Taeping was wrecked in the China Sea in 1871 whilst on passage to New York.

Captain Keay moved from Ariel to Oberon in the autumn of 1868. Ariel disappeared on passage from London to Australia in 1872. It is generally assumed that she was fatally pooped; her fine lines always made her at risk of this.

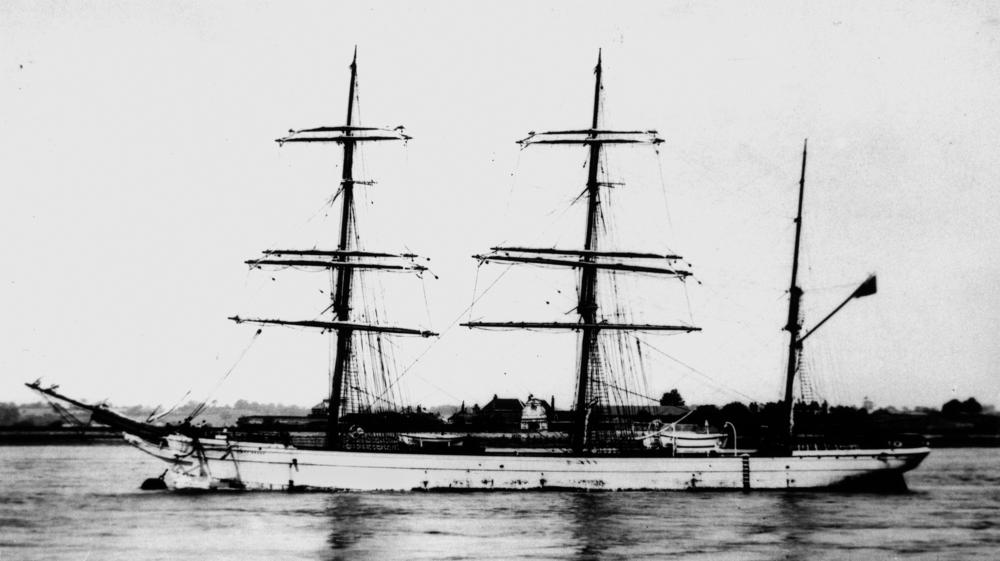
Fiery Cross in later years, with her rig reduced to barque.

Serica was wrecked on the Paracels in 1872 en route from Hong Kong to Montevideo, with only one survivor.

Fiery Cross carried her last cargo of tea in the 1872/73 tea season and then continued in general trade until, by varying accounts, she was lost either in 1889 or 1893.

Taitsing continued in the China trade, carrying her last cargo of tea in 1874/75 (101 days Fuzhou to New York). She was lost on the Quirimbas Islands in 1883, en route from Swansea to Zanzibar.

Cutty Sark, built in 1869, in the belief that the Suez Canal and steamships would not take over the tea trade, remains as virtually the sole physical reminder of the tea clipper era that was epitomised by the Great Tea Race of 1866.
