= Taitsing (clipper) =

British tea clipper

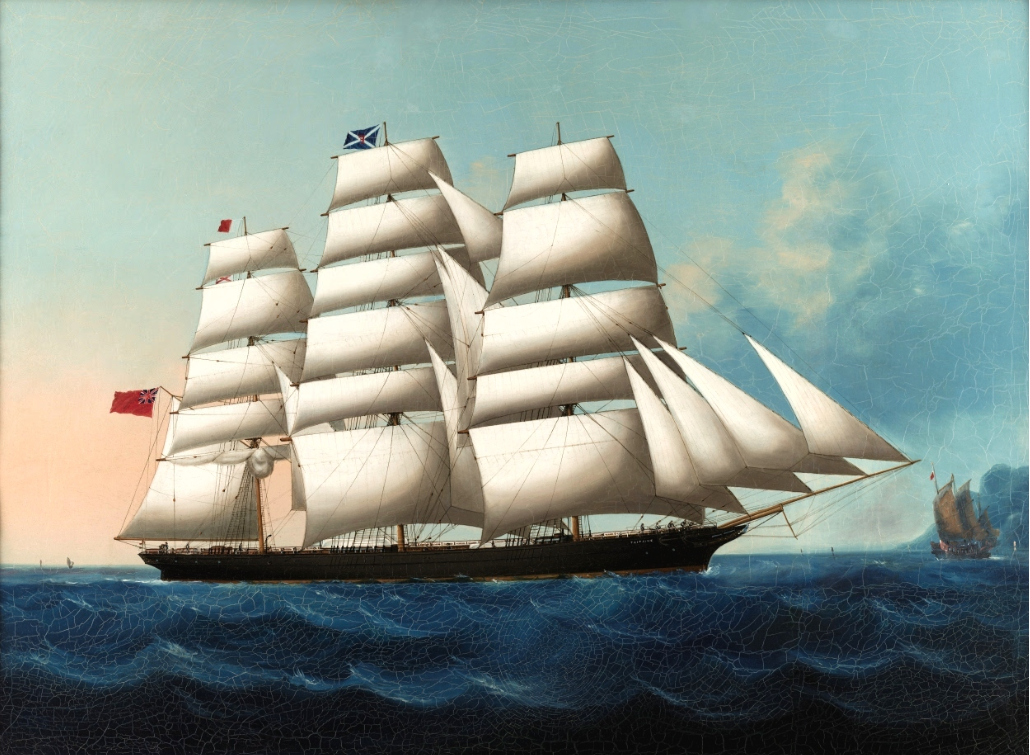
- The British clipper Taitsing (Great Arrow) off Hong Kong

History

United Kingdom
- Name: Taitsing
- Owner: Findlay & Longmuir, Greenock; 1865-1876; James Findlay, Greenock; 1876-1880; Robert D Willis, London; 1880-1883
- Builder: Charles Connell & Co, Glasgow
- Launched: 25 July 1865
- Fate: Sank 20 September 1883
- Notes: Arrived fifth in The Great Tea Race of 1866

General characteristics
- Class & type: Clipper
- Tonnage: 815 NRT
- Length: 192 ft
- Beam: 31.5 ft
- Depth: 20.1 ft
- Sail plan: Full-rigged ship

Taitsing was a famous British tea clipper.

== Tea Clipper Taitsing ==
Taitsing was a full-rigged, composite-built clipper ship, measuring 192 feet (59 meters) in length, with a beam of 31.5 feet (9.6 meters) and a draught of 20.15 feet (6.14 meters). She was built in 1865 by Charles Connell & Co, Glasgow, Scotland, for Findlay & Longmuir, Greenock, Scotland. Taitsing was launched on 25 July 1865.

The ship sailed from London to Chinese ports like Amoy, Hong Kong, Wusong, Fuzhou, and Shanghai. She also travelled from Fuzhou to New York in 1874. In 1876 the ship was sold to James Findlay of Greenock. She was sold to John Willis & Son [Robert D. Willis] of London in 1879.

== The Great Tea Race of 1866 ==
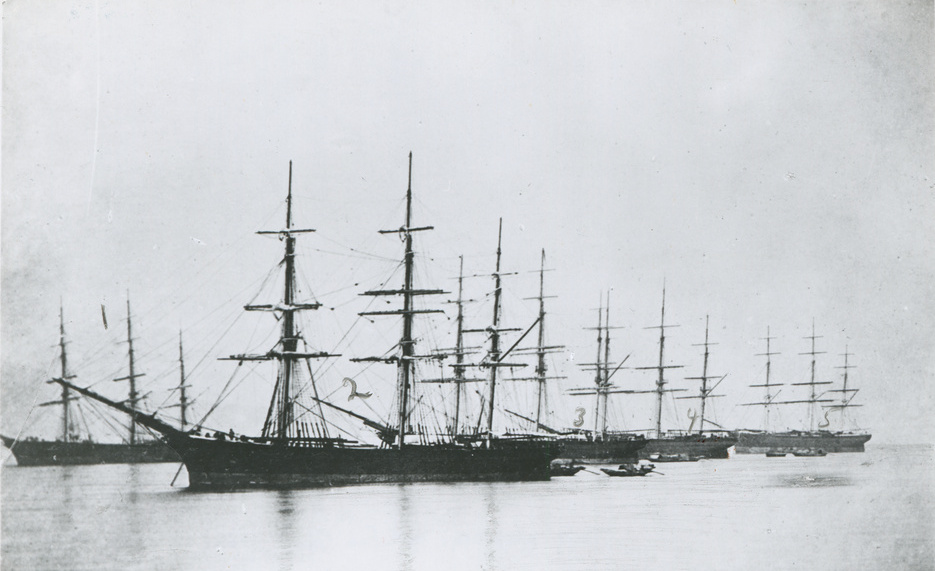
The Pagoda Anchorage, Fuzhou, in 1866. The Tea Clippers lined up awaiting their cargo. Pictured from Left to Right - The 'Black Prince', 'Fiery Cross', 'Taitsing', 'Taeping', and 'Flying Spur'

Laden with just over a million pounds (453,600 kg) of tea, Taitsing, under the command of Captain Nutsford, raced nine other ships from China to England in The Great Tea Race of 1866. The first five ships – Taiping, Ariel, Serica, Fiery Cross, and Taitsing – finished the 14,000-nautical-mile (25,930-km) race within three days of each other. Taitsing arrived fifth, in "the closest run ever recorded." Taitsing′s best 24-hour run during the race was on 2 July 1866, when she traveled 318 nautical miles (589 kilometres), averaging 13.25 knots (24.54 km/h)).

== Sinking ==
Taitsing, carrying a load of patent fuel from Swansea, Wales, sank in the Indian Ocean off Nyuni Island, Zanzibar, on 20 September 1883.

== In culture ==
A painting of Taitsing signed by the Chinese painter Hingqua, along with a painting of the clipper brig Venus, sold at auction at Sotheby's in New York City in 2009.

Hungarian writer András Dékány centered his second fiction book of his "Monostory" trilogy "The Black Prince" ("A fekete herceg") around the Taitsing, and the great tea clipper race. András Dékány was a writer, journalist, critic, while in early life worked among other things as sailor. A number of his books spoke about sailboats and sailors, including the "Monostory" trilogy, a fictional work centered on Lt. Balázs Monostory who becomes sailor during the failed Hungarian Revolution of 1848 and in this fictional book he becomes captain of Taitsing for the time of the race.
