= Sir Lancelot (clipper) =

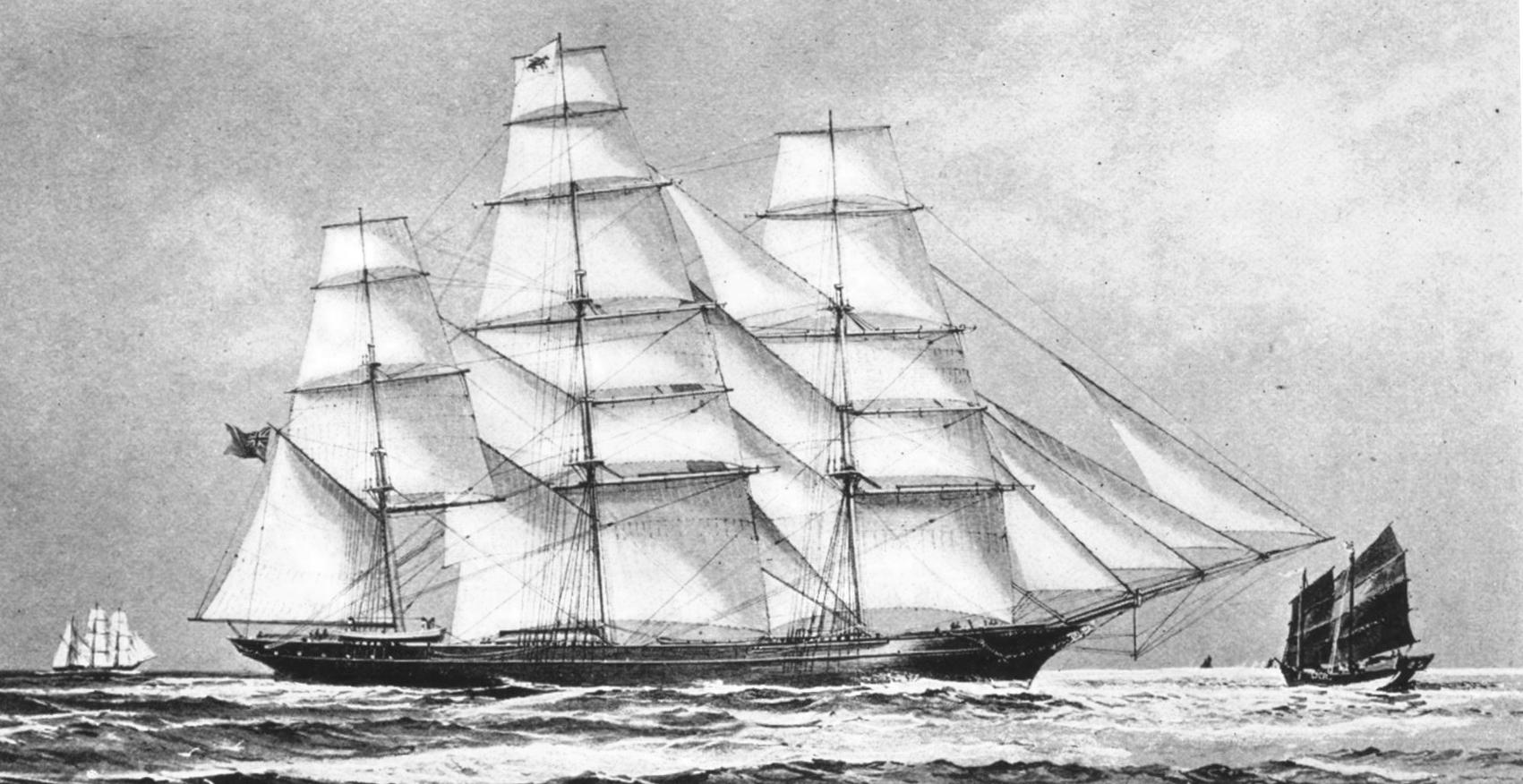
- Sir Lancelot

History

United Kingdom
- Builder: Robert Steele & Company, Greenock
- Launched: 1865

India
- Owner: Visram Ibrahim
- Acquired: 1886
- Notes: India-Mauritius trade

Persia
- Acquired: 1895
- Out of service: 1895

General characteristics
- Class & type: Composite clipper
- Tonnage: 886 NRT
- Length: 197.6 ft (60.2 m)
- Beam: 33.7 ft (10.3 m)
- Depth: 21 ft (6.4 m)
- Sail plan: Full-rigged ship; 32,811 sq ft; "Double topsails on the fore and main masts." "A single mizzen roller-reefing topsail of Cunningham's patent."

Sir Lancelot was a clipper ship which sailed in the China trade and the India-Mauritius trade.

She was built in 1865 by Robert Steele & Company, Greenock, and was of composite construction: wooden planking on iron frames. She was planked with elm below the bilge and teak above that. She carried 100 tons of permanent iron ballast.

There is some discussion as to whether Sir Lancelot was an exact sister ship of Ariel. This is felt unlikely, as the two ships were built for different owners, and Sir Lancelot did not display the tenderness aft that Ariel displayed. But it is clear that the two ships were very similar.

Sir Lancelot was typical of all of Steele's ships, celebrated for their beauty of model, perfection of build, and superb finish. They were often said to have a "yacht-like" feel, with lines that please the eye and plenty of teak and mahogany used for woodwork both on deck and below. In the poem By the Old Pagoda Anchorage, she is referred to as "Sir Lancelot of a hundred famous fights with wind and wave".

== Voyages and races ==
Captain Richard 'Dickie' Robinson of Workington was persuaded to leave the Fiery Cross to take charge of the new clipper. Sir Lancelot's owner John McCunn wrote (in a letter now in the National Maritime Museum): "Robinson was the best man I ever had in any ship and knew he got the best racing results out of Sir Lancelot".

In the Clipper Race of 1869, Robinson and Sir Lancelot established a new record between China and London. She arrived in Hong Kong on 10 January 1869 and undertook a number of "intermediate" passages to Bangkok, Saigon and Yokohama (probably carrying rice), arriving in Fuzhou on 20 June. This made her late loading tea; 7 ships left Fuzhou before her, the first being Ariel and Leander on 1 July. The Thermopylae got away on 3 July. Previously, a further 7 ships had already left other ports in China during June.

Sir Lancelot sailed at 7.00 am on 17 July and passed Anjer on 7 August. By 1 September, Cape Agulhas bore North East, 12 miles. St Helena was passed on 11 September and The Lizard 10 October. She was at Gravesend at 2.00 pm on 13 October and docked on 14 October. This was a total passage time of 89 days.

In the same "tea season", the closest time was that of Thermopylae at 91 days. In other years, there was one passage from Hong Kong to London made during the more favourable north-east monsoon, also of 89 days, by the Lothair in 1873/74. There are 3 passages of 85, 87, and 88 days from China to Liverpool (a slightly shorter distance) - all during the north-east monsoon. The consensus view, taking into account the season and the distance, is that Sir Lancelot's 1869 passage was the fastest from China to England.

Commander Dickie Robinson left Sir Lancelot because of his wife's sudden death. Under Captain Edmonds, Sir Lancelot made an outward passage of 97 days to Hong Kong, arriving on 25 Feb 1870. The homeward trip to London from Fuzhou was 104 days. However, the Suez Canal had opened in 1869 and better freight rates for tea to London were now paid to steamers. Starting in July 1871 Sir Lancelot made several tea passages to New York. Her 100 tons of permanent ballast were removed in New York in 1871 to improve the cargo carrying capacity. In 1874 her masts and yards were shortened and the studding sails ceased to be used. The dating is uncertain, but either in 1874 or in 1877 the rig was reduced to barque. Even after these changes, she retained the ability to make fast passages: in the 1877-78 tea season she achieved 94 days from Shanghai to New York. In 1874-75 she made two tea voyages, leaving Fuzhou on 18 July 1874 to arrive in London on 19 November 1874 - but on 6 May 1875 (well before the new tea crop was available) she left Shanghai for New York on a 106-day passage.

Captain Murdo Stewart MacDonald took command of Sir Lancelot in 1882. She took sugar and rice from Mauritius to the Indian coast or the Gulfs and salt to Calcutta or Rangoon. She took six cargoes a year, when speed meant money, and when almost every passage saw the breaking of a record.

In 1886 Sir Lancelot was bought by the Parsee merchant Visram Ibrahim and C.W. Brebner took command. Captain Brebner survived four cyclones in Sir Lancelot before she was sold to Persian owners in 1895. It is believed that Sir Lancelot was lost in the Bay of Bengal on 1 October 1895 during a cyclone near Sand Heads, Calcutta whilst on passage from the Red Sea with a cargo of salt bound for Calcutta.

== Ship's model ==
- Model of Sir Lancelot
