= SS Erl King =

Coordinates: 25.4254°N 80.1248°W

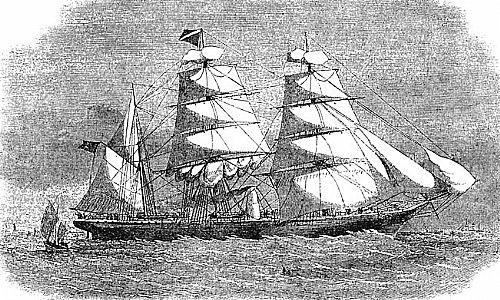
- The SS Erl King

History

United Kingdom
- Name: SS Erl King
- Namesake: Erl King
- Owner: Robertson & Co London
- Builder: A. & J. Inglis, Pointhouse, Glasgow, Scotland
- Yard number: 26
- Launched: 7 September 1865
- Completed: October 1865
- Fate: 15 December 1891 - Wrecked Long Reef, Key West, Florida

General characteristics
- Type: Iron auxiliary steamship
- Tonnage: 1671 grt
- Tons burthen: 1400 bm
- Length: 305.6 feet
- Beam: 34.1 feet
- Depth of hold: 28.3 feet
- Installed power: 250hp
- Propulsion: Auxiliary steam, lifting screw
- Sail plan: Barque
- Speed: 12.24 knots (trials speed)
- Capacity: 40 first class passengers, 400 second and third class passengers

The SS Erl King was built at A and J Inglis, Pointhouse, Glasgow and launched in 1865 and owned by Robertson & Co London. She was designed as an Auxiliary Steam Ship - steam power would be used to supplement the propulsion from the sails, when there was no wind or if there was a light head wind. She was fitted with a propeller that could be lifted up when sailing, so as to reduce drag. The engine was not powerful enough to push the ship, with all the windage of standing rigging, directly into a strong headwind. Auxiliary steam power had the advantage of allowing this vessel to use the Suez Canal when it opened in 1869 - something which was not practical for sailing vessels.

== China trade ==
The Erl King was used in the China trade – sailing from Britain to China to collect, primarily, tea. The ending of the British East India Company's monopoly of the tea trade from China to Britain in 1834 had given rise to the tea clipper era, with much of the tea that was brought from China being carried in high speed sailing vessels that competed to get the first "new crop" to market in Britain. (Slower sailing vessels also carried tea.) In 1866, the Erl King entered this trade in competition with the sailing vessels. The tea clippers, if able to load a cargo early, would race against each other, often with a premium payment written into the bills of lading for the winning ship. These races were reported in the newspapers, bets were placed, and tea wholesalers and retailers would mention which ship had carried the batches of tea they were selling.

1866 happened to be a very close race among the tea clippers. The Erl King loaded a cargo of 1,108,100 pounds of tea in Foochow and sailed on 5 June 1866. The first clippers had left a week earlier. However, the Erl King arrived in London on 20 August 1866, a passage of 77 days – with the sailing vessels still in the Atlantic. The fastest clippers arrived on 6 September with passage times of 99 days – their race was virtually a dead heat. The merchants who had promised the 10 shillings a ton premium to the winning sailing vessel therefore lost out, not only because so many race participants had arrived at the same time, but because "new crop" tea from the Erl King had already been on the market for well over a week.

The Erl King also carried passengers. On her 1866 passage from China, these included the wife of Captain MacKinnon, master of the Taeping, one of the two clippers that tied first place in the Tea Race that year. Mrs. MacKinnon had presumably not traveled on her husband's racing ship as she was pregnant. She gave birth to a baby boy whilst the Erl King was "about 4 days sail from Cape de Verde".

== Loss ==
She was wrecked on Long Reef, east of the Florida Keys.
