= Fiery Cross (clipper) =

British tea clipper

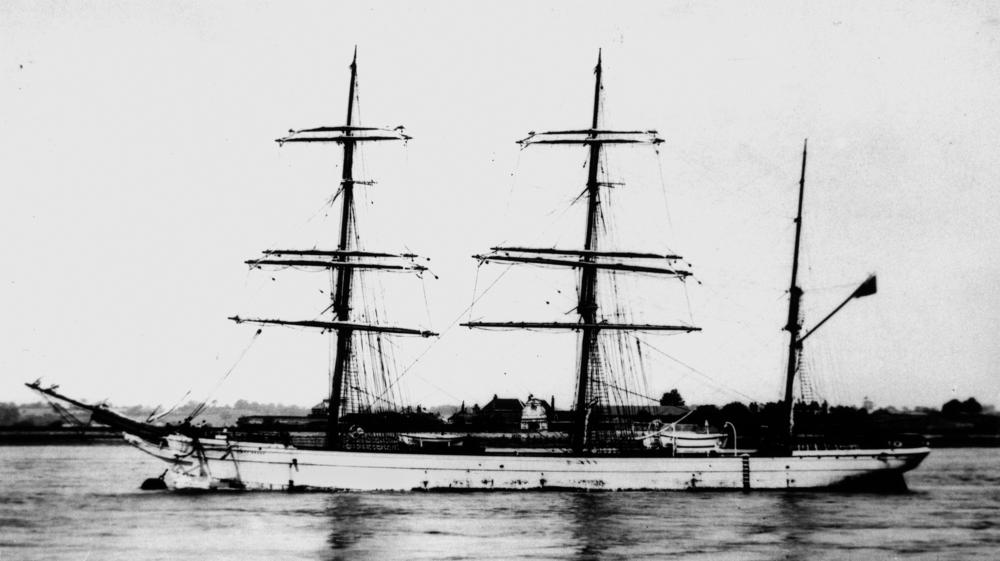
- Fiery Cross, in later years, with the rig reduced to barque

History

United Kingdom
- Owner: John Campbell, Glasgow
- Builder: Shipyard at Chaloner, Liverpool
- Launched: 1860
- Notes: First tea clipper home in 1861,1862, 1863 and 1865.

History

Norway
- Name: Ellen Lines
- Acquired: 1887
- Out of service: 1889 or 1893

General characteristics
- Class & type: Clipper ship
- Tonnage: 695 NRT
- Length: 185 ft (56 m)
- Beam: 31.7 ft (9.7 m)
- Depth: 19.2 ft (5.9 m)
- Notes: Designed by William Rennie. Equipped with Cunningham's roller-reefing top-sails and steel masts.

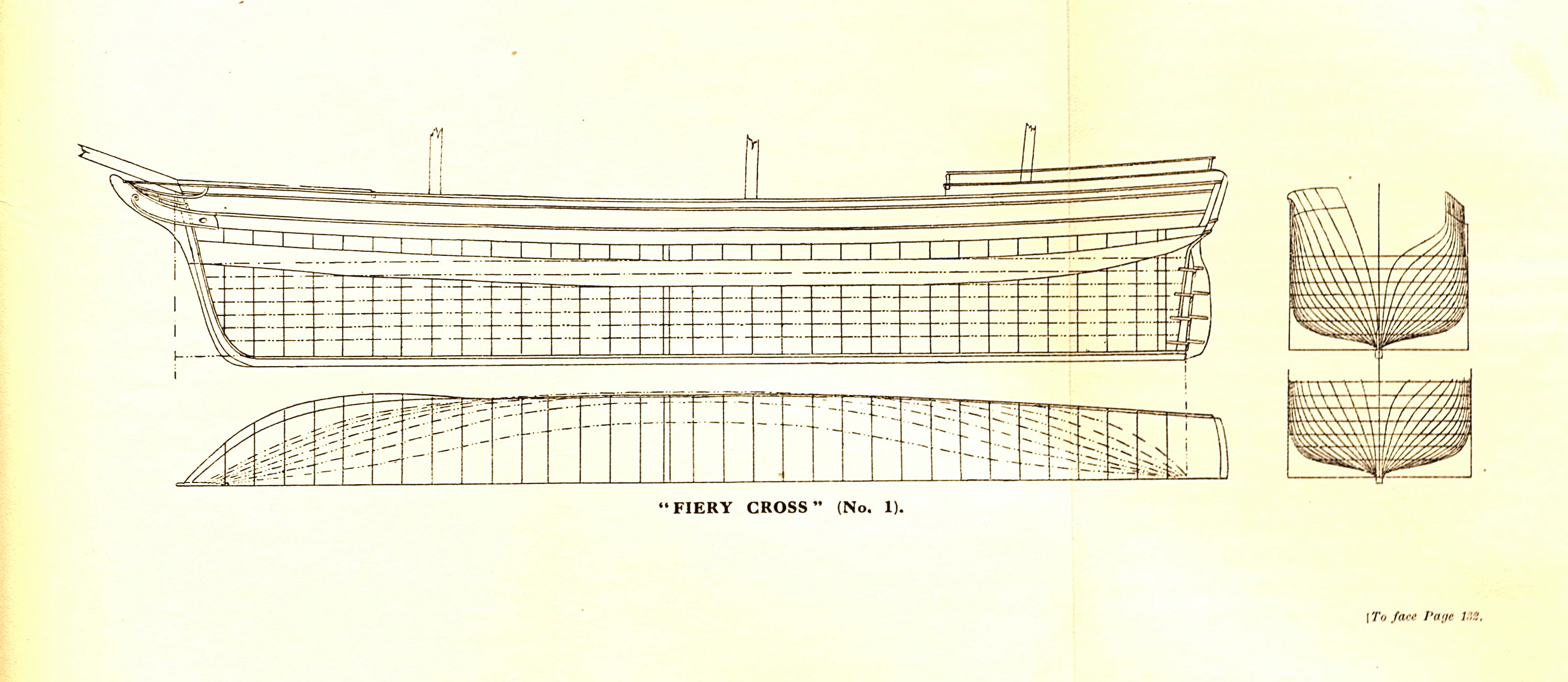
Lines of clipper Fiery Cross

Fiery Cross was a famous British tea clipper which sailed in the Great Tea Race of 1866. She was the first ship home in the tea seasons of 1861, 1862, 1863, and 1865.

She was the second tea clipper of this name; the first Fiery Cross, built in 1855, had the same owner and designer and was also built in Liverpool. This earlier ship was lost on the then-uncharted Fiery Cross Reef in the China Sea on 4 March 1860 (the crew reached land safely in her boats). The new ship was already being built and so took on the name of her predecessor.

== Tea trade ==
From 1860 to 1875, the ship sailed in the tea trade between London and Chinese ports like Hong Kong, Fuzhou, Canton, and Shanghai.

== Great Tea Race of 1866 ==
Laden with close to a million pounds of tea, Fiery Cross raced nine other ships from China to England in The Great Tea Race of 1866. Fiery Cross arrived fourth, in "the closest run ever recorded". The first five ships, Taiping, Ariel, Serica, Fiery Cross, and Taitsing, finished the 14,000 mile race within three days of one another.

Fiery Cross had the best overall 24-hour run of all the competitors in this race on 24 June, when she travelled 318 miles, averaging 13.7 knots.

== Sailing performance ==
According to Lubbock, the tea clippers Fiery Cross, Taeping, Serica and Lahloo performed at their best in light breezes, as they were all rigged with single topsails.
