= SS Agamemnon (1865) =

Iron-hulled steamship with more efficient engine

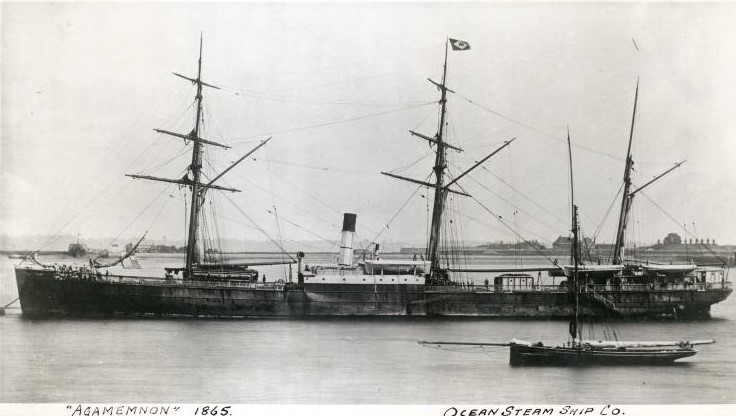
- Agamemnon

History

United Kingdom
- Name: Agamemnon
- Namesake: Agamemnon
- Owner: Ocean Steam Ship Co
- Operator: Alfred Holt Ltd
- Port of registry: Liverpool
- Route: Liverpool to China and the Far East
- Builder: Scott & Co, Greenock
- Yard number: 116
- Launched: 6 October 1865
- Identification: UK official number 54924; code letters JKGB
- Fate: Scrapped 1898

General characteristics
- Type: cargo and passenger steamship
- Tonnage: 2,270 GRT, 1,550 NRT
- Length: 309.3 ft (94.3 m)
- Beam: 38.8 ft (11.8 m)
- Depth: 20.6 ft (6.3 m)
- Installed power: 300 hp
- Propulsion: compound steam engine, single screw
- Sail plan: 3-masted barque
- Speed: 10 knots (19 km/h)

SS Agamemnon was one of the first successful long-distance merchant steamships. She was built in 1865 to trade between Britain and China, and competed with tea clippers before and after the opening of the Suez Canal in 1869. She brought together three improvements in steamship design: higher boiler pressure, an efficient and compact compound steam engine, and a hull form with modest power requirements.

Before Agamemnon, steamships were not a practical commercial option for trade between Britain and the Far East. The amount of coal that they needed to carry left little space for cargo. Agamemnon could steam at 10 knots (19 km/h), consuming only 20 tons of coal a day. This was substantially less than other ships of the time – a saving of between 14 and 23 tons per day was achieved. This enabled her to steam to China with a coaling stop at Mauritius on the outward and return journey.

This was the first of five Blue Funnel ships to be named after Agamemnon, the king of Mycenae during the Trojan War. Later examples include a motor ship Agamemnon built in 1929, which in the Second World War was converted into an auxiliary minelayer.

== Building and performance ==
Agamemnon was the first of three sister ships, the others being Achilles (1866) and Ajax (1867). Scott & Co of Greenock, Renfrewshire built the three ships for Alfred and Phillip Holt's Ocean Steam Ship Company, later called the Blue Funnel Line. Each was 2,270 GRT and 1,550 NRT. Overall length was 309 feet (94 m) and beam 38 feet (12 m).

Agamemnon (and her sister ships) combined three key features.

The first was a higher boiler pressure than was normally used on British merchant ships. Alfred Holt had experimented with a boiler pressure of 60 psi in the Cleator, a ship he used as a floating testbed. Holt overcame the Board of Trade's objections to boiler pressures above 25 psi in seagoing vessels.

The second feature was her compound steam engine, designed by Alfred Holt. As well as being more efficient than others of the time, it was a relatively compact engine, so used less cargo space.

The third was an iron hull that was strong in relation to its weight and cost and with modest power requirements – again developed by Alfred Holt.

Agamemnon's fuel efficiency enabled her to compete successfully with tea clippers between Britain and China. She could steam from London to Mauritius, a distance of 8,500 miles (roughly half the distance to China via the Cape of Good Hope) without coaling.

Her normal journey time from Fuzhou (Foochow) to Liverpool was 58 days, whereas clippers could take anything from a record-breaking 88 days to 140 or more, and averaged 123 days in 1867–68. Further, her cargo carrying capacity was two or three times as much as these sailing ships.

Scott built Agamemnon as yard number 116, launched her on 25 November 1865 and completed her on 31 March 1866. Alfred Holt registered her at Liverpool. Her UK official number was 54924, and by 1871 her code letters were JKGB.

== Maiden voyage ==
The newly built Agamemnon arrived in Liverpool from Greenock on 1 April 1866, the year of the clippers' Great Tea Race. She sailed for China on 19 April. Her outward passage was the quickest recorded to date, reaching Mauritius in 40 days and Singapore in 60. The whole journey from Liverpool to Hong Kong took 65 days. This beat the fastest tea clipper outward passage of 77 days by the Cairngorm in 1853.

== Later voyages ==
The opening of the Suez Canal in 1869 guaranteed the success of Agamemnon and her sister ships by shortening the route that a steamship could take from Europe to China whilst sailing vessels still had to travel via the Cape of Good Hope. In a few years the predominance of tea clippers in the China trade had ceased. Associates and competitors of Alfred Holt built similar ships and the nature of long-distance maritime trade had taken a major technological change.

== Fate ==
In 1897 Agamemnon was transferred to Alfred Holt's Dutch subsidiary Nederlandsche Stoomboot Maatschappij Ocean. She was scrapped in 1899.
