= Serica (clipper) =

History

United Kingdom
- Name: Serica
- Owner: James Findlay
- Builder: Robert Steele & Company, Greenock
- Launched: 1863
- Fate: Wrecked on the Paracels, 1872

General characteristics
- Tonnage: 708 NRT
- Length: 185.9 ft (56.7 m)
- Beam: 31.1 ft (9.5 m)
- Depth: 19.6 ft (6.0 m)
- Complement: Crew of 23

The Serica was a clipper built in 1863 by Robert Steele & Co., at Greenock on the south bank of the Clyde, Scotland, for James Findlay. She was the last-but-one wooden clipper built by Steele before the yard went over to building composite clippers.

== Winner of 1864 Tea Race ==
Serica is Latin for "China"—the ship was built expressly for the China tea trade. Serica participated in the annual "tea races" to bring the new season's crop to London; she won in 1864. In 1865 she was the leading ship off Beachy Head, but failed to get a tug to take her on to London, so was beaten by 12 hours by Fiery Cross. In The Great Tea Race of 1866, she came in third, by a matter of hours.

== Sailing performance ==
According to Basil Lubbock, the tea clippers Serica, Fiery Cross, Lahloo and Taeping performed at their best in light breezes, as they were all rigged with single topsails.

== Loss of the ship ==
On her final voyage under Capt. George Innes, she left Hong Kong bound for Montevideo, 2 November 1872, and was wrecked on the Paracels, in the South China Sea the following day. Out of a crew of twenty-three that manned her, only one survived.

== See also ==
- List of clipper ships
