= Taeping =

Tea clipper, built 1863

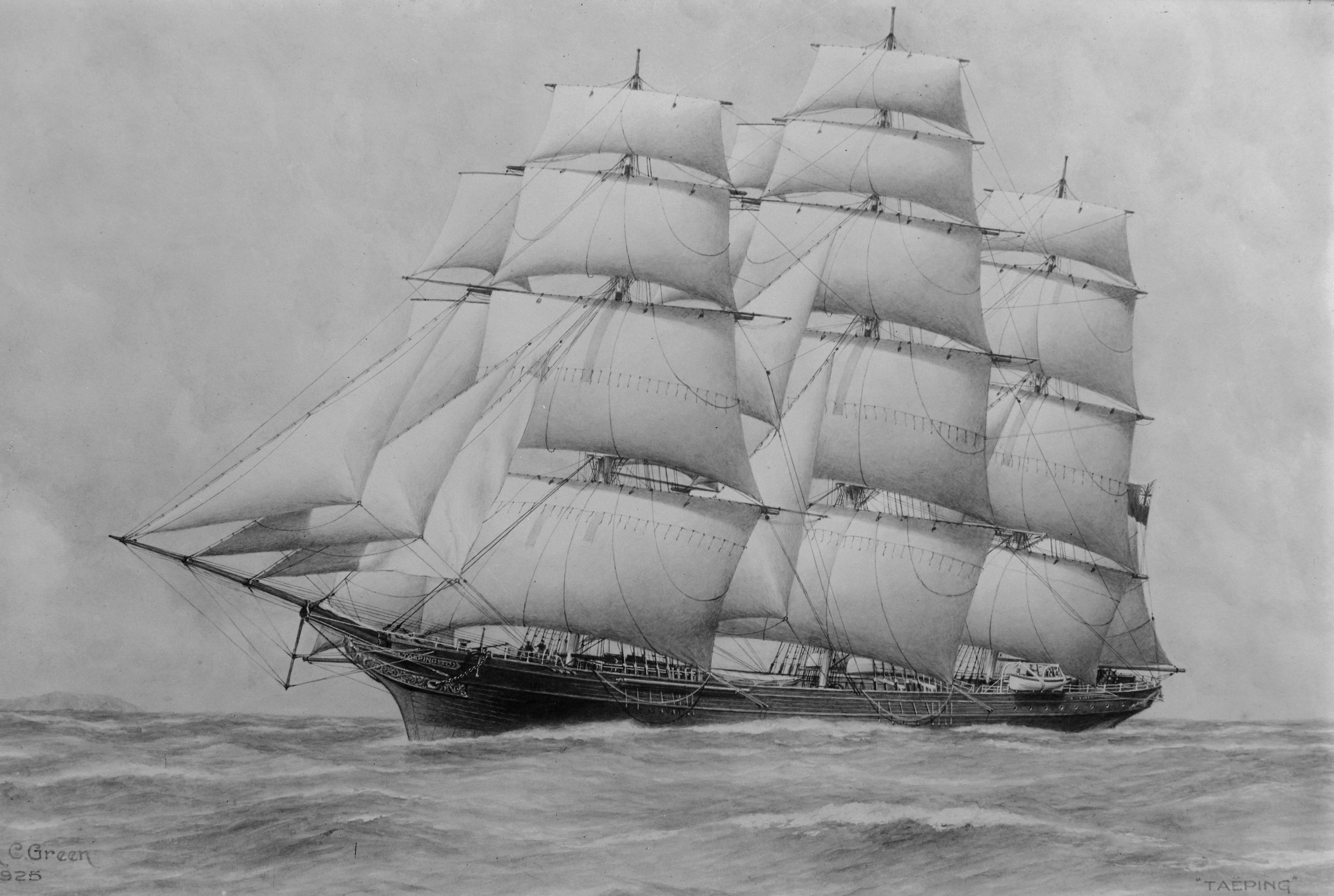
- Taeping

History

United Kingdom
- Builder: Robert Steele & Company, Greenock
- Launched: 1863
- In service: 1863–1871
- Out of service: 1871
- Fate: Wrecked near Ladd Reef 1871

General characteristics
- Class & type: Clipper
- Tonnage: 767 NRT
- Length: 183 ft (56 m)
- Propulsion: Sails

The Taeping was a tea clipper built in 1863 by Robert Steele & Company of Greenock and owned by Captain Alexander Rodger of Cellardyke, Fife. Over her career, Taeping was the first clipper to dock in London in three different tea seasons. This compares with the highly successful Fiery Cross, who won the "premium" in four separate tea seasons.

Taeping was one of the front runners in the very close Great Tea Race of 1866. Despite Ariel being ten minutes ahead of Taeping at Deal, Taeping docked 28 minutes before Ariel as she did not need to wait so long for the tide to rise to allow entry to her dock – and it was whoever docked first that was the winner.

The ship's first captain was Donald MacKinnon (Dòmhnall ’ic Nèill ’ic Dhòmnaill Ruaidh) of Heanish, Tiree. He was taken ill on the outward passage to China for the 1867-68 tea season and put ashore in South Africa, where he died. The first mate, J. Dowdy took over command, remaining in that position until he moved to another clipper in 1871.

Taeping was wrecked on 22 September 1871 on Ladd Reef in the South China Sea while traveling to New York.

== Construction ==
Taeping was the first ship built of composite construction in the yard of Robert Steele and Company. Composite construction, a metal framework with wooden planking, gave a stiffer hull that occupied less internal volume, but could still be sheathed with copper (to avoid marine fouling) as the timber electrically insulated the copper from the underlying iron structure – so preventing galvanic corrosion.

She was launched on 24 December 1863. She measured 183.7 feet (56.0 m) length on deck, had a beam of 31.1 ft (9.5 m) and a depth of hold of 19.9 ft (6.1 m) feet. She was 767 tons.

== Career ==
=== 1864–65 and 1865–1866 tea seasons ===
Taeping encountered a typhoon on her first trip back from China with a cargo of tea. She left Shanghai on 1 July 1864. After losing her bowsprit, foremast and the main and mizzen topmasts in the storm, she was towed into Amoy by HMS Flamer on 23 July. After the substantial repairs that were needed, she sailed again on 8 October and made the very quick passage of 88 days to Deal.

Her 1865 outward passage from London to Hong Kong was 94 days. The homeward passage started on 29 June and was of 104 days.

=== 1866–67 tea season ===
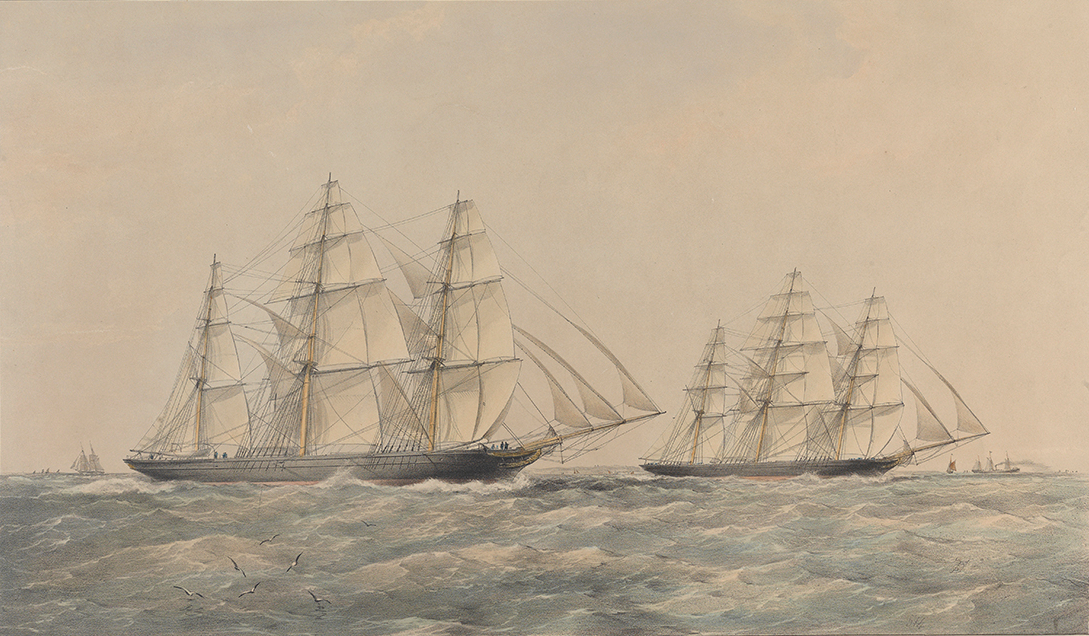
Taeping and Ariel racing up the Channel, by the contemporary marine artist T. G. Dutton

In May 1866 Taeping was one of 16 clippers waiting to load tea in Foochow (Fuzhou). This was the port where the new crop of tea became available at the earliest point in the season – so this is where ships trying to be the first back to London had to load. She sailed on 30 May, as did Ariel (after a delay getting over the bar) and Serica. A multiple previous winner of tea races, Fiery Cross had been the first to sail the day before, and Taitsing left on 31 May.

The very close race that followed became known as the Great Tea Race of 1866. Though these ships were out of sight of each other for much of their passage back to England, they were a few days apart for most of that time. Ariel was the first to enter the English Channel, but with Taeping in sight as soon as the sun rose.

Ariel was ten minutes ahead of Taeping at Deal, where both ships signalled their numbers and collected pilots. After taking tugs, the two ships had to wait for the tide at Gravesend before proceeding to their respective docks in London. Taeping had the advantage that there were two sets of lock gates to enter London Docks. When the tide was high enough, she was able to pass through the outer set of gates and the lock was topped up from the water in the basin. Ariel's destination, East India Docks, only had a single set of lock gates. So she had to wait for the tide to rise a little further before she could enter. The result was that Taeping docked 28 minutes before Ariel, being the winner under the rules.

Serica docked late on the same tide, so three tea clippers had arrived, in commercial terms, at the same time. This would cause a glut in the market for new crop tea. To avoid the tea merchants (who were obliged to pay a "premium" of 10 shillings per ton, as written into the bills of lading, to the winning ship) calling the race void through some technicality, Taeping's owners agreed to share the premium with Ariel if they did not contest the result – and this agreement was put into effect. This was the last tea season in which a "premium" was written into any bill of lading for being the first clipper home from China.

=== Later voyages ===
On Taeping's next outward passage to China, Captain MacKinnon, her master, became seriously ill and was landed at Algoa Bay. He died on the way home, at the age of 41. The first mate, Dowdy, took over command. On the return trip to London, for the 1867–68 season, Taeping was the fourth ship to sail from Foochow, with Serica and Maitland having crossed the bar of the Minh river 3 days before. By the time Serica was passing Hong Kong, 5 days later, Taeping had caught up. With a total passage time of 102 days, Taeping was the first tea clipper to dock in London that season.

In the 1868-69 tea season, Taeping was one of the front runners, putting in a passage of 102 days, but was beaten both on passage time and arrival date by Ariel and Spindrift. She was the first tea clipper home in the 1870–71 season.

=== Loss ===
Taeping struck Ladd Reef in the China Sea on the night of 22 September 1871. She was on route to New York from Amoy. Every effort was made to get her off, but she was stuck fast. The crew took to the ship's three boats and stayed with the ship in the hope that she would be lifted off by the tide. She was abandoned on 24 September and the boats set off for Saigon. They became separated in rough weather. One was picked up by Serica, who was also bound for New York with tea. The other two boats made it safely to land.
