= Leander (clipper) =

Ship built in 1867

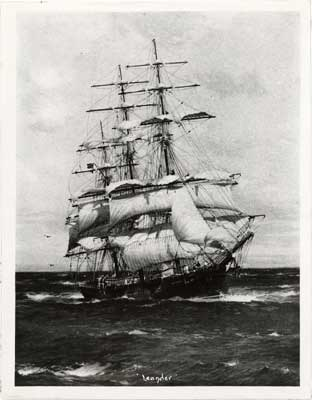
- Leander

History

United Kingdom
- Owner: Joseph Somes, Merchant Shipping Co, London
- Builder: J G Lawrie of Glasgow
- Launched: 1867
- Acquired: R. Anderson of London, Ross & Company

Oman
- Owner: Seyed Youssouf bin Ahmed Zuwawee
- Acquired: 1895
- Renamed: Nusrool Mujeed
- Fate: Broken up in 1901

General characteristics
- Tonnage: 886 GRT; 848 NRT
- Length: 215.5 ft (65.7 m)
- Beam: 35.2 ft (10.7 m)
- Depth: 20.7 ft (6.3 m)
- Sail plan: Full-rigged ship, re-rigged as barque in 1890s
- Notes: British Reg. No. 56878. Signal, HSGM

Leander was a composite built clipper ship. She was designed by Bernard Waymouth, and built in 1867 by J G Lawrie of Glasgow for Joseph Somes. She had a particularly extreme hull shape, with a coefficient of under-deck tonnage of 0.54, a very low figure. She was at her best in light winds and performed well to windward or in a head sea. Being somewhat tender if pressed in heavy weather, she had to carry so much ballast that she was down to her marks before being fully laden.

== Ship history ==
Before 1871, Leander sailed between London and the Far East (China) and later from China to New York City. She was in the tea trade until 1879. Re-rigged as a barque in the 1890s, the ship was sold to R. Anderson of London and then to Ross & Company. Her last owner was Seyed Youssouf bin Ahmed Zuwawee of Oman. She was renamed Nusrool Mujeed in 1895 and broken up in 1901.
