= Ariel (clipper) =

British clipper launched in 1865

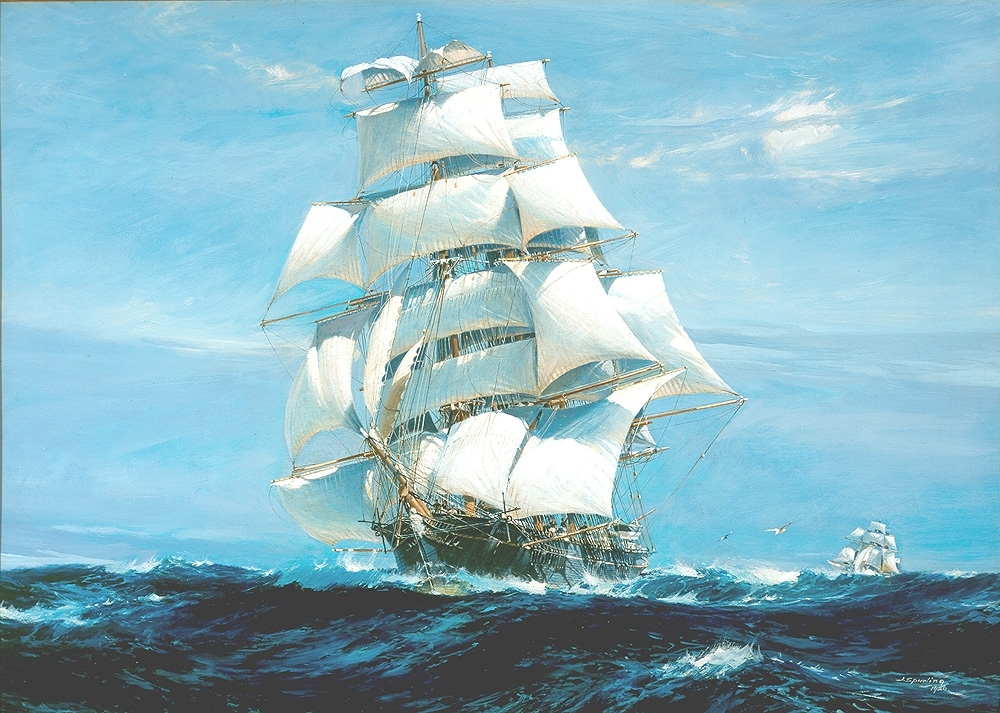
- Ariel and Taeping in The Great Tea Race of 1866

History

United Kingdom
- Name: Ariel
- Builder: Robert Steele & Co., Greenock
- Launched: 1865
- Fate: Foundered 1872

General characteristics
- Type: Clipper
- Tonnage: 852.87 NRT
- Length: 197.4 ft (60.2 m)
- Beam: 33.9 ft (10.3 m)
- Depth: 21 ft (6.4 m)

Ariel was a clipper ship famous for making fast voyages between China and England in the late 1860s. She is most famous for almost winning The Great Tea Race of 1866, an unofficial race between Fuzhou, China and London with the first tea crop of the 1866 season.

== Description ==
Ariel was a full-rigged ship of 853 tons net register, measuring 197.4 feet (60.2 m) x 33.9 feet x 21 feet (6.4 m). She was built in 1865 by Robert Steele & Company, Greenock for Shaw, Lowther & Maxton of London. Like the majority of tea clippers launched after 1864, she was composite built, of timber planking over iron frames.

== Great Tea Race of 1866 ==
A premium was paid for the first consignment of tea to reach London in each season. The clipper Fiery Cross left Fuzhou on 29 May and Ariel, Taeping and Serica on the 30th. On 6 September Taeping docked twenty minutes ahead of Ariel, and about two hours ahead of Serica. Fiery Cross and Taitsing arrived two days later.

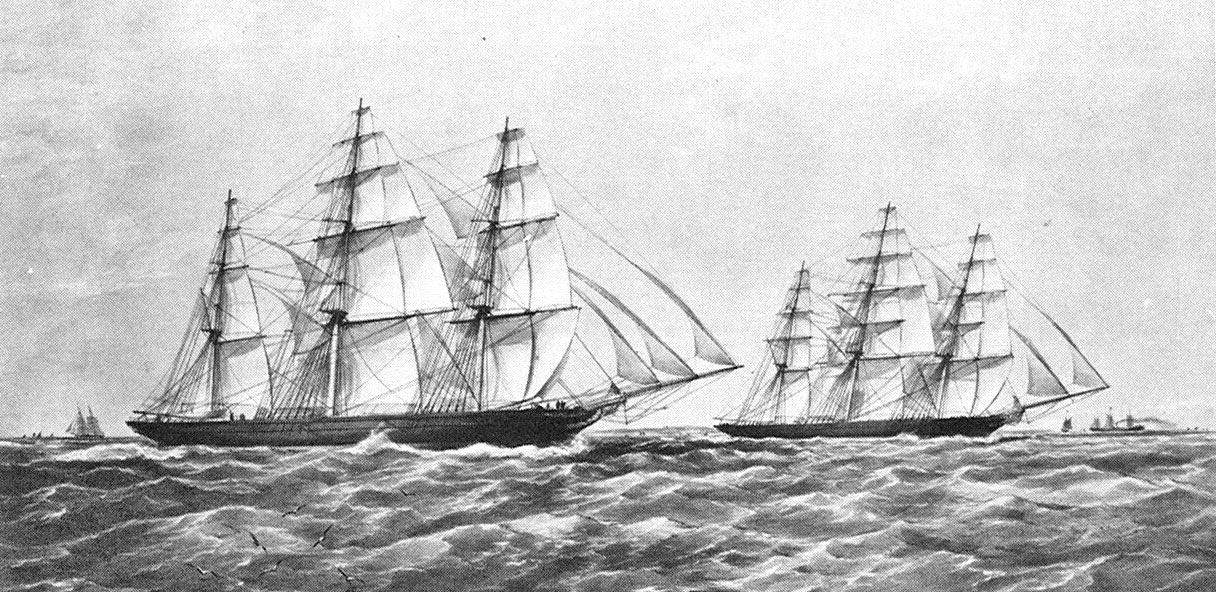
Taeping and Ariel in the Great Tea Race of 1866

After 99 days and almost 16,000 miles (26,000 km) the leaders were still tied and raced within sight of each other the full length of the English Channel and into the Thames. Taeping, under Captain McKinnon, drew less water and was able to tie up in the London docks twenty minutes ahead of Ariel, under Captain Keay. Taeping divided her winnings of 10 shillings per ton with the owners of Ariel and Captain McKinnon divided the captain's £100 with Captain Keay, who hailed from Anstruther.

With the completion of the Suez Canal the tea trade was taken over by steamships and most of the clippers transferred to the Australian trade, carrying general cargo to either Sydney or Melbourne, and returning with wool — for which a premium price was also paid on the first shipments of the season.

== Loss of the ship ==
Ariel sailed from London for Sydney on 31 January 1872, but failed to arrive. She is assumed by most who knew her to have been fatally pooped (i.e., had a wave break over the stern) - her fine lines always made her at risk of this. Around August 1872 the remains of a teak-built ship's life-boat carrying a brass fitting with the gothic-script letter A were found on King Island in Bass Strait. It was believed to have come from the missing vessel, which, if the assumption was correct, probably foundered in the Southern Ocean after rounding the Cape of Good Hope.
