= Coonatto (clipper ship) =

1863 clipper ship

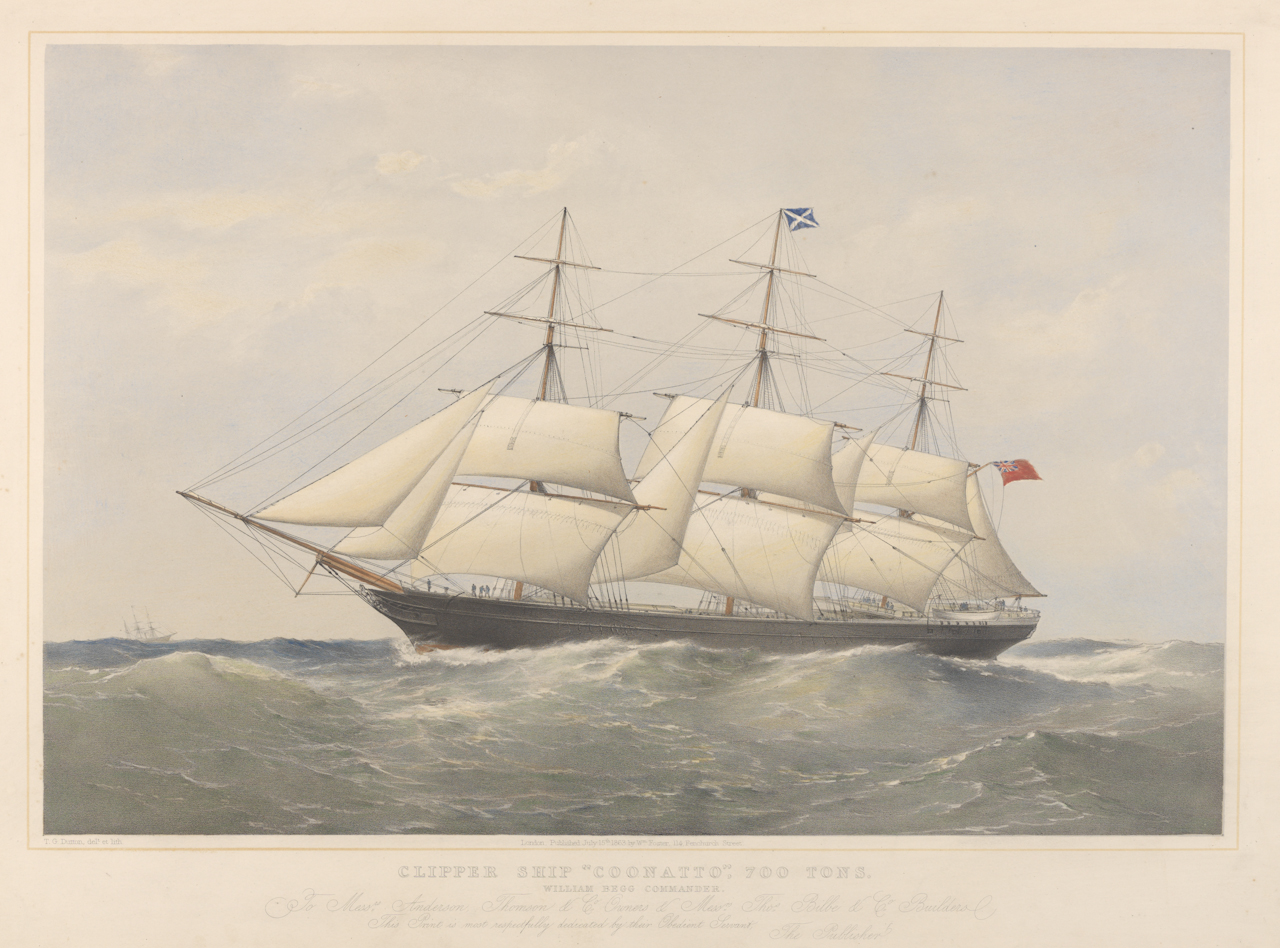
- Coonatto by Thomas Goldsworthy Dutton and William Foster, about 1863

History

United Kingdom
- Name: Coonatto
- Owner: Anderson, Thompson & Co
- Port of registry: London
- Builder: Thomas Bilbe and William Perry, Rotherhithe
- Launched: 1863
- Identification: UK official number 47320; code letters VNDP
- Fate: Wrecked February 1876

General characteristics
- Type: clipper
- Tonnage: 633 GRT
- Length: 160.2 ft (48.8 m)
- Beam: 29.0 ft (8.8 m)
- Depth: 18.7 ft (5.7 m)
- Sail plan: full rig

Coonatto, was a British three-masted clipper that was built in 1863 and wrecked in 1876. She traded between London and Adelaide for 12 years. She was wrecked in the English Channel in February 1876.

== Building ==
Thomas Bilbe and William Perry built Coonatto at the Nelson Dock, Rotherhithe, Surrey in 1863 for Anderson, Thompson & Co., previously James Thompson & Co. and later Anderson, Anderson & Co., who from 1861 trade as "The Orient Line of Packets", commonly referred to as the "Orient Line" of London. Their relationship with the builder began with Celestial, an all-timber ship constructed on their patented system of framing, followed by the clipper Orient, from which the line gained its name. Other ships built by Bilbe for the company were Argonaut, Borealis and Yatala, the last-named also on the Adelaide route.

Coonatto was named after the once-famous sheep station of Grant and Stokes. She was a ship of 633 GRT, 160.2 ft (48.8 m) long, with a 29.0 feet (8.8 m) beam and 18.7 ft (5.7 m) depth. She was designed to carry passengers and cargo swiftly between Britain and Australia. The cargo on the return voyage was chiefly wool, but also copper. She was an early example of a composite ship, with an iron frame and timber cladding, giving more open space for cargo.

Anderson, Thompson & Co registered Coonatto at London. Her United Kingdom official number was 47320 and her code letters were VNDP.

== Career ==
Her master for the first four voyages was Captain William Begg, previously of the Sebastian. He was a hard-driving skipper who made some very quick passages to Adelaide. Her fastest time was 66 days to the Semaphore lightship and 70 from dock to dock, even after losing both her helmsman and the wheel overboard during a manoeuvre off St Paul's Island.

Begg was succeeded 1869–1872 by James Norval Smart, previously master of The Murray. John Eilbeck Hillman succeeded Captain Smart.

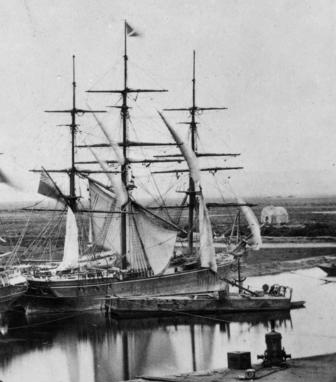
Coonatto at Port Adelaide in May 1867 or 1869

During the sixties and seventies, when Sydney and Melbourne were filling their harbours with the finest ships in the British Mercantile Marine, Adelaide, in a smaller way, was carrying on an ever increasing trade of her own, in which some very smart little clippers were making very good money and putting up sailing records which could well bear comparison with those made by the more powerful clippers sailing to Hobson's Bay and Port Jackson. ... Their captains, however, were always keen in rivalry and put a high value on their reputations as desperate sail carriers. They made little of weather that would have scared men who commanded ships of three times the tonnage of those little Adelaide clippers, and they were not afraid of a little water on deck. — Basil Lubbock in The Colonial Clippers (1921)

Her last trip was uneventful until almost home. She left Adelaide on 14 November 1875 laden with copper and wool and reached the Channel on 19 February. She sighted the usual lights: Bishop Rock, The Lizard and Start Point, and St Catherine's Point, but not the light at Beachy Head, which was where Coonatto foundered. There were no injuries, and much of the cargo was saved, but the ship broke up and was lost.

A Board of Trade enquiry found Captain Hillman negligent in not sounding for depth when his position was in doubt, and his certificate was suspended for three months. These circumstances closely mirrored the loss of the Yatala under John Legoe of the same company just four years earlier.

A year later Hillman was appointed master of the Inch Kenneth (1866) of 1,120 tons, which on 23 September 1877 capsized and sank in the South Atlantic, the cause being attributed to the load, bags of wheat and linseed, shifting in heavy seas. 18 of her complement of 26 perished, Hillman included. The eight who survived had been at sea for three days in the lifeboat before being picked up by the Liverpool.

== Some other clippers on the England to Adelaide run ==
- City of Adelaide
- The Goolwa
- Hesperus
- The Murray
- Orient
- Rodney
- St Vincent
- South Australian
- Yatala
