= Orient (clipper ship) =

Clipper ship of 1,133 tons, built in 1853

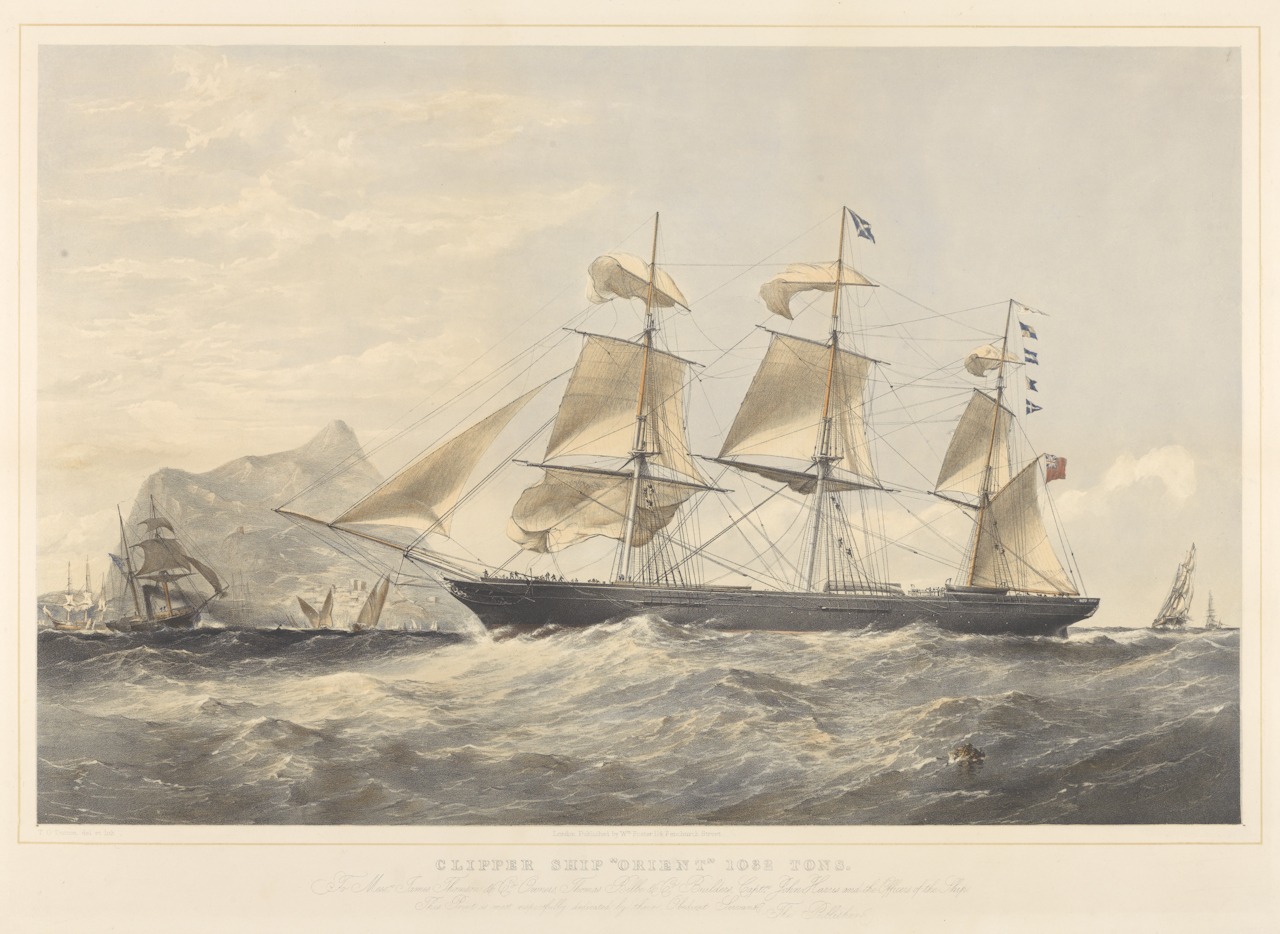
- Orient by Thomas Goldsworthy Dutton and William Foster, about 1860

History

United Kingdom
- Name: Orient
- Owner: 1853: James Thompson & Co; 1879: Cox Brothers; 1890 Smith, Imossi & Co
- Port of registry: 1854 London; 1879: Waterford; 1890: Gibraltar
- Builder: Thomas Bilbe, Rotherhithe
- Launched: 1853
- Completed: 14 December 1853
- Identification: UK official number 12981; code letters VTHC
- Fate: Scrapped 1925

General characteristics
- Tonnage: 1,133 GRT, 1,032 NRT
- Length: 184.4 ft (56.2 m)
- Beam: 31.7 ft (9.7 m)
- Depth: 21.1 ft (6.4 m)
- Sail plan: 1853: full-rigged ship; 1886: barque

Orient was a wooden-hulled, three-masted sailing ship that was built in England in 1853 and scrapped in Gibraltar in 1925. She served in the Crimean War, and then spent two decades with James Thompson & Co's "Orient Line" of ships sailing between Great Britain and South Australia.

Orient was built as a full-rigged ship. In 1886 she was reduced to a barque. In 1890 she was converted into a hulk, and in 1925 she was scrapped.

== Building ==
Thomas Bilbe built Orient at Nelson Dock, Cuckold's Point, Rotherhithe, launching her in 1853 and completing her on 14 December that year. Her registered length was 184.4 ft (56.2 m), her beam was 31.7 ft (9.7 m) and her depth was 21.1 ft (6.4 m). Her tonnages were 1,133 GRT and 1,032 NRT.

She had a composite hull with an iron frame and timber planks. Beneath a 61-foot (19 m) poop she was fitted with cabin space, not included in any earlier Bilbe design.

Orient's first owner was James Thomson & Co (also spelt Thompson), who registered her in London. Her United Kingdom official number was 12981 and her code letters were VTHC.

== Career ==
Orient did not immediately enter the trade with Australia for which she was built. The Crimean War began in October 1854, two months before Bilbe completed her. As soon as she was completed, the UK Government chartered her as "Transport No. 78". She started her war service as a troop ship, carrying military materiél and members of the 88th Regiment of Foot to Crimea.

From October 1855 Orient was a hospital ship. In 1856 the UK Government returned her to her owners.

In 1856 Orient finally made her first voyage to Australia. Commanded by Captain A Lawrence she took prospectors to Sydney who were headed for Australia's goldfields.

In 1857 Orient sailed direct from Portsmouth to Adelaide. She made similar trips every year until 1877. It was at the inauguration of a liner service to Australia in 1861 that Thompson & Co began trading as "The Orient Line of Packets", commonly called the "Orient Line".

In January 1862 Orient was sailing from Cape Town to London when she caught fire in the South Atlantic and was nearly destroyed. A Dutch ship was standing by to rescue those on board, and the captain and crew could have left the ship, but resolutely over the course of a day brought the fire under control. She was able to reach Ascension Island, where her damaged cargo was discharged and she was given temporary repairs. Captain Lawrence, his officers and crew were handsomely rewarded by the insurance underwriters for their efforts.

Orient's second Master was Captain Harris, under whom she made some of her fastest passages from Plymouth to Port Adelaide, notably 72 days in 1866. Later Masters were Roland De Steiger 1868–1871, WH Mitchell 1873–1876, and Martin Haffner 1876–1878.

In April 1879 Cox Brothers bought Orient and registered her in Waterford, Ireland, who used her in trans-Atlantic trade. In 1886 they had her rig reduced to a barque. In 1890 Smith, Imossi & Co, agents for the P&O, bought her and turned her into a coal hulk at Gibraltar. In 1925 she was scrapped at Gibraltar.

== Recognition ==
- Australia Post issued a 45 cent stamp featuring Orient.
- In 1888 Charles Conder painted a famous painting of the ship, Departure of the Orient – Circular Quay, shortly before he left Sydney for Melbourne.
- The National Maritime Museum holds painting of Orient' by Thomas Goldsworthy Dutton.

== Some other clippers on the England to Adelaide run ==
- City of Adelaide
- Coonatto
- The Goolwa
- Hesperus
- The Murray
- Rodney
- St Vincent
- South Australian
- Yatala
