= St Vincent (clipper ship) =

English ship built in 1865

History
- Name: St Vincent
- Owner: 1865: Devitt and Moore; 1894: J Beyson; 1896 GT Jorgensen
- Port of registry: 1865: (United Kingdom) London; 1894: (Norway) Kristiansand
- Builder: Pile, Hay & Co, Sunderland
- Yard number: 141
- Launched: 22 July 1865
- Completed: September 1865
- Identification: UK official number 52770; code letters HDRK
- Fate: Scrapped 1907

General characteristics
- Type: clipper
- Tonnage: 892 GRT
- Length: 190.0 ft (57.9 m)
- Beam: 35.0 ft (10.7 m)
- Depth of hold: 18.9 ft (5.8 m)
- Sail plan: 1865: full rig; 1884: barque

St Vincent was a three-masted sailing ship that was built in England in 1865, renamed Axel in 1894 and scrapped in 1907. For the first part of her career she was a clipper, trading between London and Adelaide. She was later re-rigged as a barque, and spent the final part of her career she was under Norwegian ownership.

== Building ==
Pile, Hay & Co of Sunderland built St Vincent in 1865, launching her on 22 July and completing her that September. She was of composite construction (iron frame and timber planking). Her registered length was 190.0 feet (57.9 m), her breadth was 35.0 feet (10.7 m), her depth was 18.9 feet (5.8 m) and her tonnage was 892 GRT. As built, she was a full-rigged ship.

Her first owner was Devitt and Moore's Adelaide Line, who registered her in London. Her United Kingdom official number was 52770 and her code letters were HDRK.

== Career ==
On her maiden voyage she left Plymouth 14 September 1865, with Captain Alexander Louttit, formerly of the Sea Star, as her Master. He remained her captain until 1873, and went on to command the Rodney.

St Vincent's subsequent captains were Walter H Bisset 1873–1875, John Howard Barrett 1875–1881, formerly of Outalpa and subsequently of South Australian, Hesperus and Illawarra, Albert John Ismay 1881–1884, previously of Gateside and Castle Dunbar and later of Barossa, and Malcolm Nicholson 1884–1887, previously of John Rennie, later of Simla.

In 1884 her sail plan was reduced to a barque. In 1894 J Beyson of Kristiansand bought St Vincent and renamed her Axel. In 1896 GT Jorgensen, also of Kristiansand, bought her. She was scrapped in Dunkerque in 1907.

== Some other clippers on the England to Adelaide run ==
- City of Adelaide
- Coonatto
- The Goolwa
- Hesperus
- The Murray
- Orient
- Rodney
- South Australian
- Torrens
- Yatala

== Bibliography ==
- Lubbock, Basil (1921). The Colonial Clippers. Glasgow: James Brown & Son.
