= The Goolwa (clipper ship) =

Three-masted, composite-hulled clipper ship

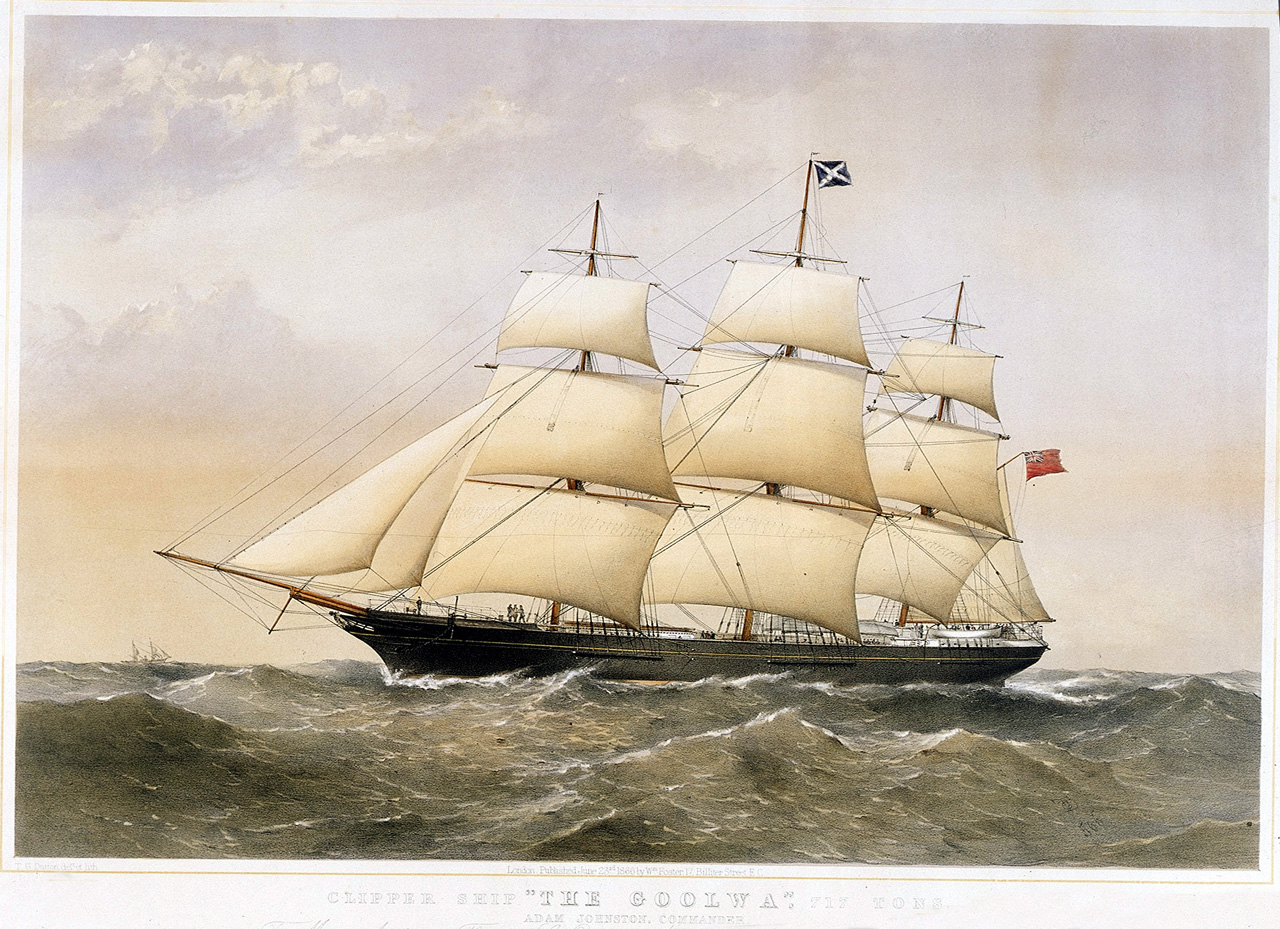
- The Goolwa by Thomas Goldsworthy Dutton and William Foster

History

United Kingdom
- Name: The Goolwa
- Namesake: Goolwa, South Australia
- Owner: Anderson, Thompson & Co
- Port of registry: 1864: London; 1887: Glasgow
- Builder: Alexander Hall & Co, Aberdeen
- Yard number: 237
- Launched: 1864
- Completed: March 1864
- Identification: UK official number 48750; code letters VWCT
- Fate: Sunk 5 February 1888

General characteristics
- Type: composite clipper
- Tonnage: 717 GRT, 717 NRT
- Length: 178.5 ft (54.4 m)
- Beam: 30.7 ft (9.4 m)
- Depth: 18.8 ft (5.7 m)
- Propulsion: sail
- Sail plan: 1864: full rig; by 1877: barque
- Complement: 17

The Goolwa was a three-masted, composite-hulled clipper ship that was built for the trade between Great Britain and South Australia. She was built in Scotland in 1864 and sank in the Western Approaches in 1888.

== Building ==
Alexander Hall & Co built The Goolwa at Aberdeen, completing her in March 1864. Her composite hull had an iron frame and timber planks. Her registered length was 178.5 ft (54.4 m), her beam was 30.7 ft (9.4 m), her depth was 18.8 ft (5.7 m) and her tonnages were 717 GRT and 717 NRT. She had three masts, and was built as a full-rigged ship.

Hall built the ship for Anderson, Thompson & Co, who ran the Orient Line of clippers between London and South Australia. Her owners registered the ship as The Goolwa, presumably to distinguish her from other ships already called Goolwa. Her United Kingdom official number was 48750 and her code letters were VWCT.

== Career ==
The Goolwa's first Master was Captain Adam Johnston, (c. 1824 – 16 March 1891, who had commanded Travancore in 1862. He went on to command Aurora (sister ship to Hesperus) in 1875, and Harbinger 1876–78.

In 1877 one A Lawrence acquired The Goolwa. In 1887 one G Cowper acquired her, and re-registered her in Glasgow.

By 1877 The Goolwa's sail plan had been reduced to a barque. From 1877 until 1885 her Master was John T. Thorkeldson or Torkelson.

== Loss ==
The Goolwa left Penarth in Wales under Captain Cornwall on 23 December 1887 with a cargo of pig iron and coke bound for San Francisco. She experienced heavy weather in the Channel, and sprang two leaks, with which her two manual pumps were unable to cope. Meanwhile, the ship was rolling heavily, the waves carried away her hatches, water poured into her holds and she began to sink. Her lifeboats had been wrecked in the storm, one of her pumps failed, and all but five of her crew were incapacitated. Her crew fired distress rockets, and after two days the steamship Cato rescued them. The Goolwa was abandoned on 5 January 1888 and sank about 100 miles west of the Isles of Scilly.

== Some other clippers on the England to Adelaide service ==
- City of Adelaide
- Coonatto
- Hesperus
- The Murray
- Orient
- Rodney
- St Vincent
- South Australian
- Torrens
- Yatala
