= Yatala (clipper ship) =

English ship wrecked in 1872

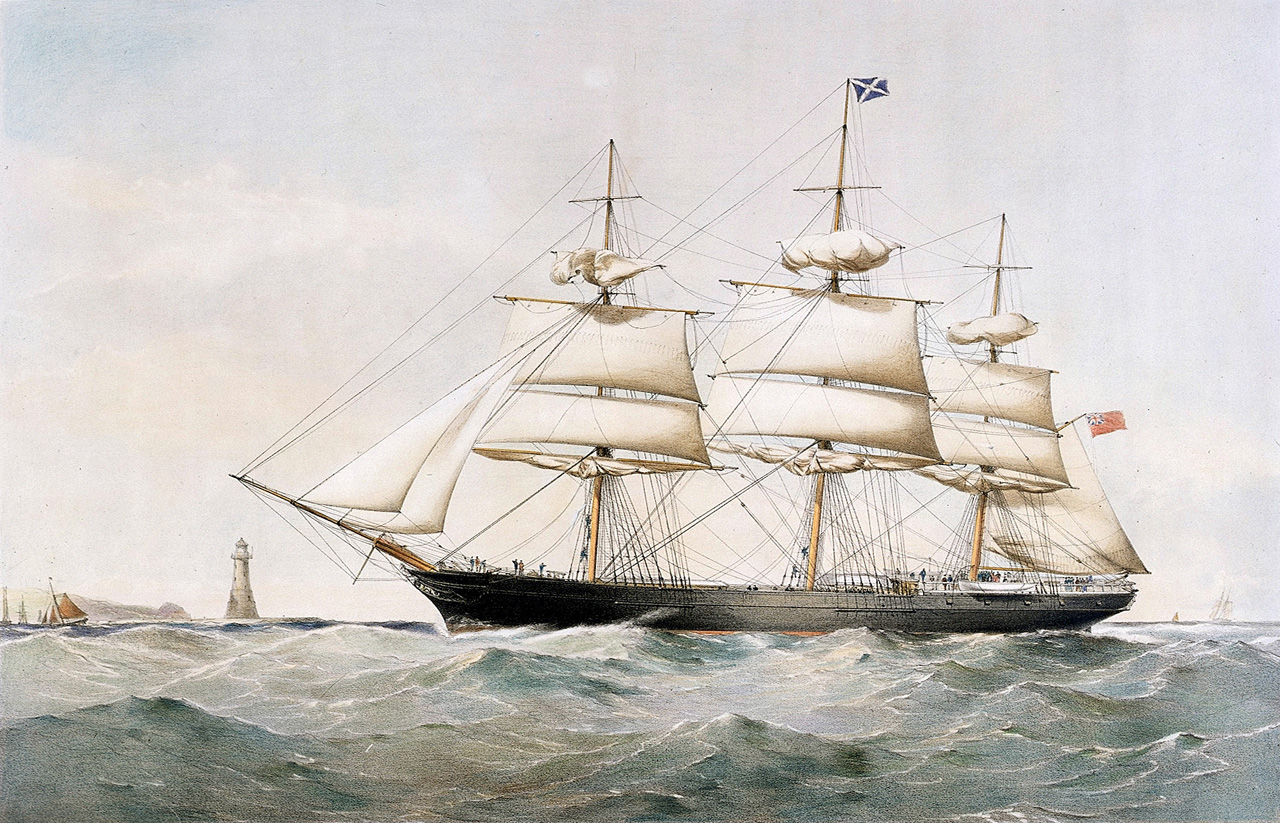
- Yatala by Thomas Goldsworthy Dutton and William Foster, about 1865

History

United Kingdom
- Name: Yatala
- Owner: Anderson, Thomson and Co
- Port of registry: London
- Builder: Thomas Bilbe, Rotherhithe
- Completed: July 1865
- Identification: UK official number 52737; code letters HRKF
- Fate: Wrecked, 27 March 1872

General characteristics
- Type: clipper
- Tonnage: 1,127 GRT
- Length: 203.4 ft (62.0 m)
- Beam: 34.6 ft (10.5 m)
- Depth of hold: 21.1 ft (6.4 m)
- Propulsion: sail
- Sail plan: full rig

Yatala was a British clipper ship that was built in England in 1865 and wrecked on the north coast of France in 1872. She spent her seven-year career with Anderson, Thomson and Co's Orient Line, sailing between London and South Australia.

Until the advent of Torrens in 1875, Yatala was arguably the fastest ship on the route. Her only master was Captain John Legoe, previously of Celestial and The Murray.

== Building ==
Thomas Bilbe built Yatala at Rotherhithe on the River Thames, completing her in July 1865. She was a composite ship of 1,127 GRT, length 203.4 feet (62.0 m), breadth 34.6 feet (10.5 m), and depth 21.1 feet (6.4 m).

Anderson, Thomson and Co registered her in London. Her United Kingdom official number was 52737 and her code letters were HRKF.

== Career ==
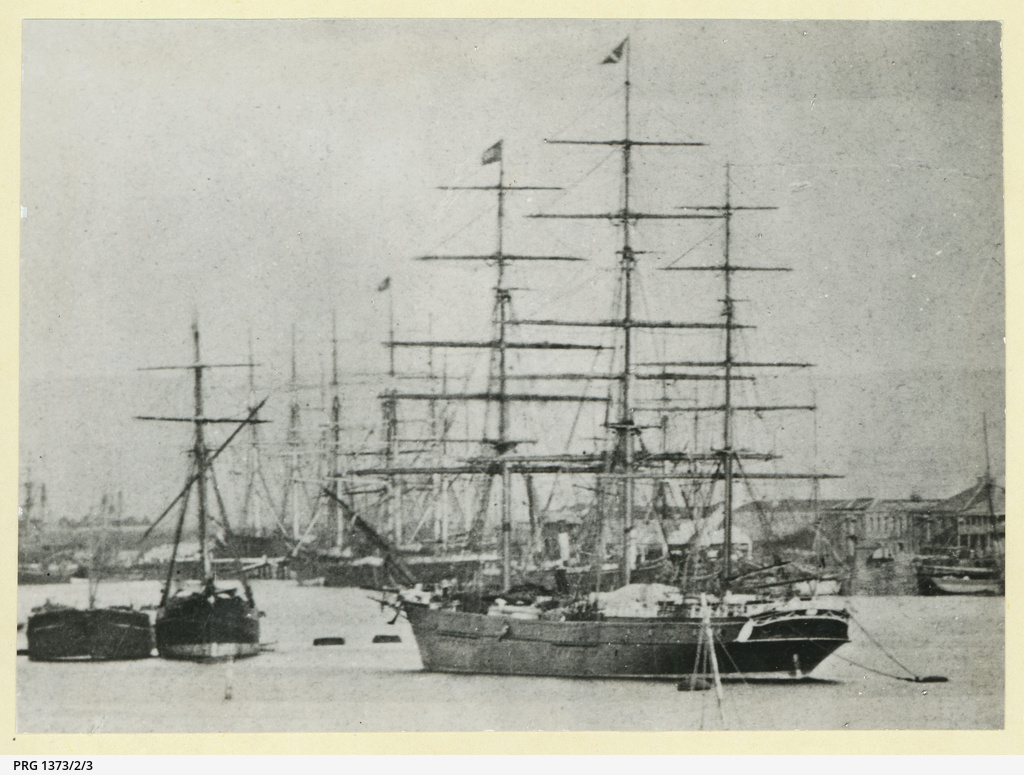
Yatala in Port Adelaide

=== The great race ===
On the eve of departure of Yatala for England after her second voyage to Port Adelaide it became clear that City of Adelaide, a similar though somewhat smaller vessel, was to leave on the same day, and would most likely make a race out of it. Crowds of spectators made their way to Port Adelaide; supporters of Captain Legoe and Yatala staying at one hotel and those of Captain Bruce and City of Adelaide another. Yatala got away at 6 a.m. on 27 December 1866 but City of Adelaide was delayed some five hours due to some oversight.

The pair were evenly matched, and at the Cape of Good Hope the difference had was only three hours, but the larger Yatala reached The Downs a day ahead of City of Adelaide which lost a further day getting to the docks. This was David Bruce's last voyage in command of City of Adelaide; he was succeeded by his son John Bruce.

=== The seven voyages of Yatala ===
Year.	Left Plymouth	Arrived Adelaide	Days Out
1865	4 August	27 October	84
1866	2 August	14 October	73
1867	10 August	15 October	66
1868	9 July	24 September	77
1869	7 August	23 October	77
1870	11 August	26 October	78
1871	6 July	2 October.	88

=== End of Yatala ===
On 18 December 1871, Yatala left Port Adelaide in company with the Elder Line clipper Beltana, which she beat to Cape Horn by a day. Beltana arrived in London safely after a tedious light weather run from the line, but Yatala ran ashore near Cap Gris-Nez shortly after midnight on 27 March 1872, when almost in sight of home. It seems that in the heavy weather that prevailed at the time Captain Legoe mistook the Cap Gris-Nez light for that of Beachy Head on the other side of the Channel. There were no deaths or injuries, the passengers sheltering at the nearby town of Audresselles. Much of the valuable cargo (mostly wool) was saved, but the ship subsequently broke up and was totally lost. The Board of Enquiry found Captain Legoe fully responsible but in view of his long and faultless service and high character, was given the relatively light sentence of six months suspension of his certificate.

Legoe supervised the construction of Hesperus at Greenock, Scotland, completed 1873, as a replacement for Yatala, subsequently serving as her master.

== Other vessels named Yatala ==
Yatala was also the name of:

- The South Australian Government schooner (1848–1864), built in Port Adelaide, used in the late 1830s and early 1840s for delivering supplies to the West Coast of South Australia. In 1858, Captain Bloomfield Douglas, harbour master of Port Adelaide, used the ship to make a detailed survey of that coast, and named Yatala Reef, on the Great Australian Bight just south of Fowlers Bay, after the ship. In 1852 Captain Edward Dowsett sighted and named Port Augusta in the schooner.
- A steam tug (1878–1922)
- A ketch built at Port Adelaide by the well-known shipbuilder Alexander McFarlane (1841–1917) around 1890.

== See also ==
- City of Adelaide
- Coonatto
- The Goolwa
- Orient
- Rodney
- St Vincent
- South Australian
- Torrens
