= South Australian (clipper ship) =

Ship, built 1868

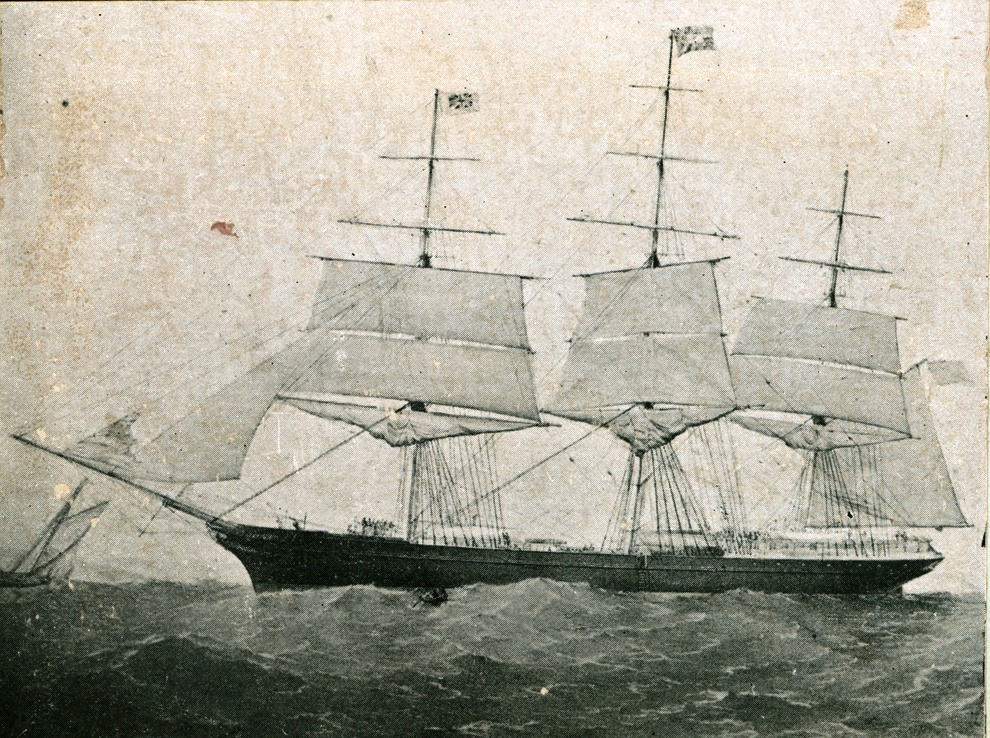
- South Australian about 1870

History

United Kingdom
- Name: South Australian
- Owner: 1868: Joseph Moore; 1887: Ship South Australian Co Ltd
- Operator: 1868: Devitt & Moore; 1887: William Woodside
- Port of registry: 1868: London; 1887: Belfast
- Builder: William Pile, Sunderland
- Launched: 24 February 1868
- Completed: July 1868
- Identification: UK official number 60837; code letters HFJC
- Fate: Sunk 14 February 1889

General characteristics
- Tonnage: 1,040 GRT
- Tons burthen: 1,230 BM
- Length: 201.0 ft (61.3 m)
- Beam: 36.0 ft (11.0 m)
- Depth: 20.1 ft (6.1 m)
- Sail plan: full-rigged ship

South Australian was a composite-hulled clipper ship that was built in Sunderland in 1868 and sank in the Bristol Channel in 1889. She was a successor to clippers St Vincent and City of Adelaide. For nearly two decades she voyaged annually between London and South Australia.

== Building ==
William Pile built South Australian at North Sands, Sunderland, launching her on 24 February 1868 and completing her that July. Her registered length was 201.0 feet (61.3 m), her breadth was 36.0 ft (11.0 m) and her depth was 20.1 feet (6.1 m). Her tonnages were 1,040 GRT and 1,230 tons BM. She had three masts and was a full-rigged ship.

Captain David Bruce supervised her building, and she was named by a daughter of Henry Martin, a South Australian part-owner.

South Australian's original owner was Joseph Moore of Devitt and Moore's "Adelaide Line" of packet boats, underwritten by a consortium of investors. Moore registered her in London. Her United Kingdom official number was 60837 and her code letters were HFJC.

== Clipper career ==
Captain Bruce was South Australian's first Master, and commanded her until 1872. She was then commanded alternately by his sons: John Bruce 1872–74 and 1877–80, and Alexander Bruce 1876–77. John Howard Barrett commanded her 1882–83 and 1885–86. Barrett had previously been Master of Outalpa and St Vincent, and later commanded Hesperus and Illawarra.

== Final years ==
In 1887 William J Woodside of Belfast bought South Australian. He used her to carry cargo to India and New Brunswick, commanded by Captain James Arthurs.

On 13 February 1889 while on a passage from Cardiff to Rosario, Argentina loaded with railway rails and fishplates, she ran into a gale off Lundy and the captain decided to run before the wind. As the ship rolled in the great seas her cargo began to shift in her hold as a solid mass. In the early hours of 14 February the cargo broke through her hull.

As the ship began to sink, her crew launched a lifeboat in difficult conditions and all but one of the crew survived. They drifted for 12 hours, until the schooner Spray rescued them. They were transferred to the steam trawler Flying Scotchman, which landed them at Swansea.

== Wreck ==
In 1986 members of the Ilfracombe & North Devon Sub-Aqua Club found South Australian's cargo of iron at a depth of 42 metres (140 ft) in the Bristol Channel. It is about three miles northeast of Lundy. In 2015 Wessex Archaeology undertook a geophysical mapping survey of the wreck for the club.

== Some other clipper ships on the England to Adelaide service ==
- City of Adelaide
- Coonatto
- The Goolwa
- Hesperus
- The Murray
- Orient
- Rodney
- Torrens
- St Vincent
- Yatala
