= David Bruce (captain) =

David Bruce (July 1816 – 25 February 1903) was a Scottish master mariner, remembered as skipper of the well-known clipper ships Irene, City of Adelaide and South Australian.

== History ==
Captain Bruce made his first of many trips to South Australia as captain of the clipper ship Irene in 1855, then took command of the clipper City of Adelaide for her first voyage to Adelaide in 1864. He was a keen rival of Captain John Legoe and his clipper Yatala, both being primarily engaged in the wool trade, but with accommodation for passengers in some style and comfort, and quite speedy to boot. His last command of the "City" was notable for the race between these two from Port Adelaide to London, narrowly won by Yatala.

After making several voyages in the City of Adelaide, Captain Bruce in 1868 brought out the South Australian, of which he was part owner. His elder son John Bruce succeeded him as master of City of Adelaide, and the younger, Alexander Bruce, succeeded him as master of South Australian.

== Family ==
David Bruce married Janet McIntyre ( – ). Their ten children included two ship's captains:

- John Bruce (9 October 1839 – 17 August 1915) born in Perth, Scotland, he married Ada Eleanor Angas (1 June 1853 – 1931), second daughter of George Fife Angas, on 28 November 1874. He became harbourmaster of the Tyne, retired in 1912 to Hallgarth, Tasmania.
- Alexander Bruce (19 June 1848 – 3 September 1891) born in Perth, Scotland, he married Jane Buik (2 December 1856 – 19 August 1925), second daughter of W. C. Buik on 29 November 1876. They had four children.
