= Devitt and Moore =

House flag of Devitt and Moore

Devitt and Moore was a British shipping company formed by Thomas Henry Devitt and Joseph Moore in 1836. They became shipowners and entered the passenger and cargo trade to Australia managing and owning many clipper ships such as City of Adelaide and South Australian. With the advent of steam, they developed a training scheme for cadets and formed Pangbourne College.

== Devitt and Moore fleet ==
In purchasing their first two full-rigged ships from Duncan Dunbar in 1863, Devitt and Moore started their long connection with Australia as shipowners. Over the next fifty-five years until the end of the First World War when they finally conceded to the competition from steamships, at various times the Devitt and Moore fleet comprised twenty-nine square-rigged sailing ships and two steamships carrying passengers, wool, copper and general cargo between Great Britain and Australia. Thomas Henry Devitt's grandson Howson Foulger Devitt went on to establish the insurance broker Devitt Insurance in 1936.

The following list of ships owned by Devitt and Moore was adapted from a book by Captain AG Course.

Vessel Name	Original Rig	Material	Builders	Date Built	Period Owned	Gross tonnage	Net Tonnage	Length Overall (feet)	Breadth (feet)	Depth(feet)
Vimiera	Ship	Wood	James Laing, Sunderland	1851	1863-1872	967	925	165.7	33	22.9
La Hogue	Ship	Wood	James Laing, Sunderland	1855	1863-1886	1331	-	226	35	22.9
City of Adelaide	Ship	Composite	W Pile & Co, Sunderland	1864	1864-1887	791	696	176.8	33.2	18.8
Saint Dunstan	Barque 3-masted	Wood	-, Sunderland	1858	1864-1868	441	-	128.5	27.5	18
Grasmere	Barque 3-masted	Wood	G. Gardner, Sunderland	1865	1865-1883	465	-	142	28.5	17.5
Pekina	Ship	Wood	Smith, Aberdeen	1865	1865-1880	770	-	177	30.6	18.4
St Vincent	Ship	Composite	W Pile & Co, Sunderland	1865	1865-1887	892	-	190	35	18.9
Parramatta	Ship	Wood	James Laing, Sunderland	1866	1866-1887	1521	-	231	38.2	22.8
Dunbar Castle	Ship	Wood	James Laing, Sunderland	1864	1866-1881	925	-	182.7	33.9	21.5
South Australian	Ship	Composite	W Pile & Co, Sunderland	1868	1868-1887	1078	1049	201	36	20.1
Hawkesbury	Ship	Composite	W Pile & Co, Sunderland	1868	1868-1888	1179	1120	203	36.2	21.5
Chaa-Sze	Ship	Wood	A Hall & Sons, Aberdeen	1860	1868-1874	595	550	170	29.1	18.1
Outalpa	Ship	Iron	W Pile & Co, Sunderland	1869	1871-1881	717	676	187.7	30.6	18
Gateside	Barque 3-masted	Iron	A. McMillan, Dumbarton	1869	1871-1884	739	698	184.6	29.6	18
John Rennie	Ship	Iron	J. and G. Rennie, Millwall	1863	1872-1890	848	-	177	32.6	20
Collingwood	Ship	Iron	W. Hood & Co, Aberdeen	1872	1872-1893	1064	1015	211.1	34.8	21
Sobraon	Ship	Composite	A Hall & Sons, Aberdeen	1866	1872-1889	2130	-	272	40	27
Rodney	Ship	Iron	W Pile & Co, Sunderland	1874	1874-1896	1519	1447	235.6	38.4	22
Glenelg	Steamer	Iron	Samuda Brothers, Blackwall	1873	1875-1880	1316	-	249.7	32.8	22.3
Duke of Atholl	Ship	Iron	Denny & Rankin, Dumbarton	1865	1880-1889	963	-	199.2	33.2	20.9
Illawarra	Ship	Iron	Dobie & Co, Glasgow	1881	1881-1907	1963	1887	269.1	40.6	24
Simla	Barque 4-masted	Iron	Tod & McGregor, Glasgow	1854	1882-1883	2288	2172	330.2	39.8	26.7
Derwent	Ship	Iron	A. McMillan, Dumbarton	1884	1884-1904	1970	1890	275	40.2	23.7
Macquarie	Ship	Iron	R. & H. Green Blackwall, London	1875	1887-1904	1965	1857	269.8	40.1	23.7
Tamar	Ship	Steel	Napier, Shanks & Bell, Dumbarton	1889	1889-1900	2115	2048	286.8	42.5	24
Harbinger	Ship	Iron	R. Steele & Co, Port Glasgow	1876	1890-1898	1585	1506	253.5	37.6	22.4
Hesperus	Ship	Iron	R. Steele & Co, Port Glasgow	1873	1890-1899	1859	1777	262.2	39.7	23.5
Irvine	Ship	Iron	W. Doxford & Son, Sunderland	1867	1899-1901	673	655	170.6	29.5	19.1
Port Jackson	Barque 4-masted	Iron	A Hall & Sons, Aberdeen	1882	1906-1916	2212	1994	286.2	41.1	25.2
Medway	Barque 4-masted	Steel	A. McMillan & Son, Dumbarton	1902	1910-1918	2516	2298	300	43.2	24.8
St George	Barquentine	Iron and teak sheathing	Ramage & Ferguson, Leith	1890	1919-1921	694	-	191	32.1	17.8
Sunbeam	Barquentine	Composite	Bowdler, Chaffer & Co, Seacombe	1874	1920-1922, training ship	334	-	170	27.5	13.8

== Gallery ==
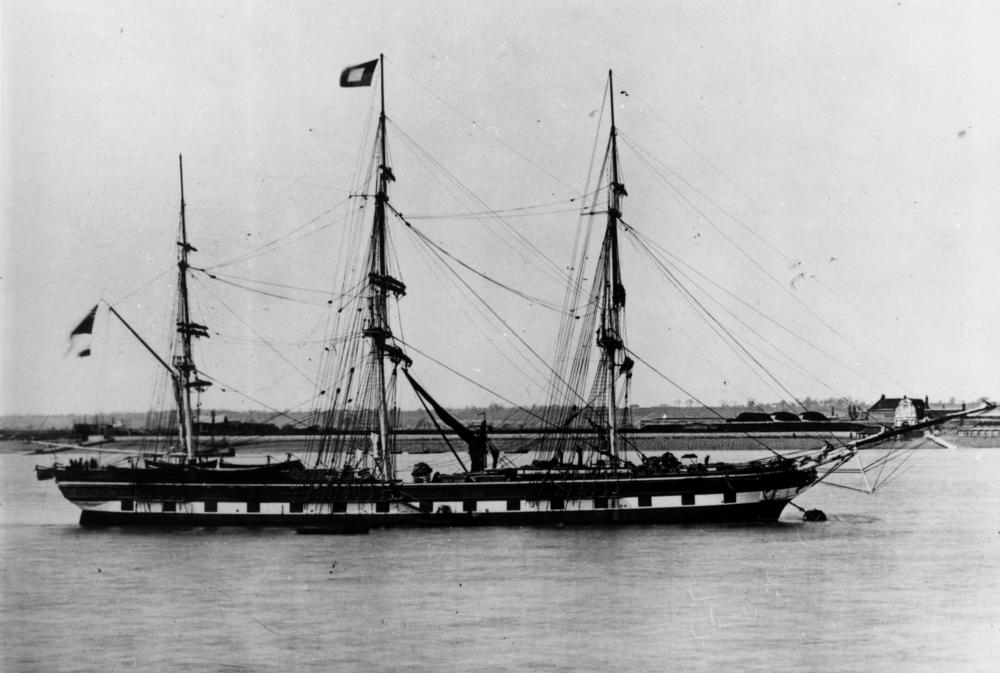
La Hogue

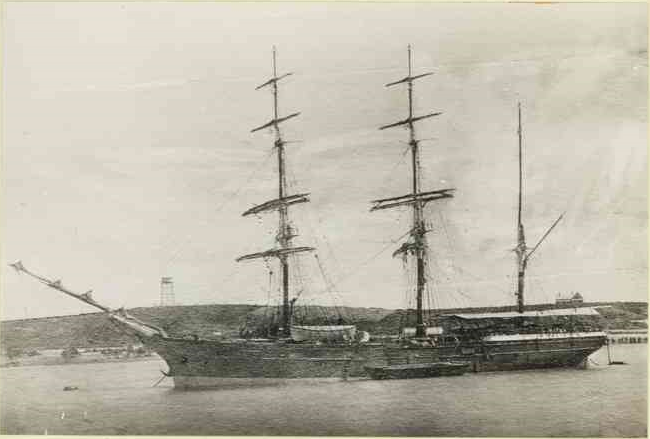
City of Adelaide at Port Augusta c1882-83, after conversion to a barque.

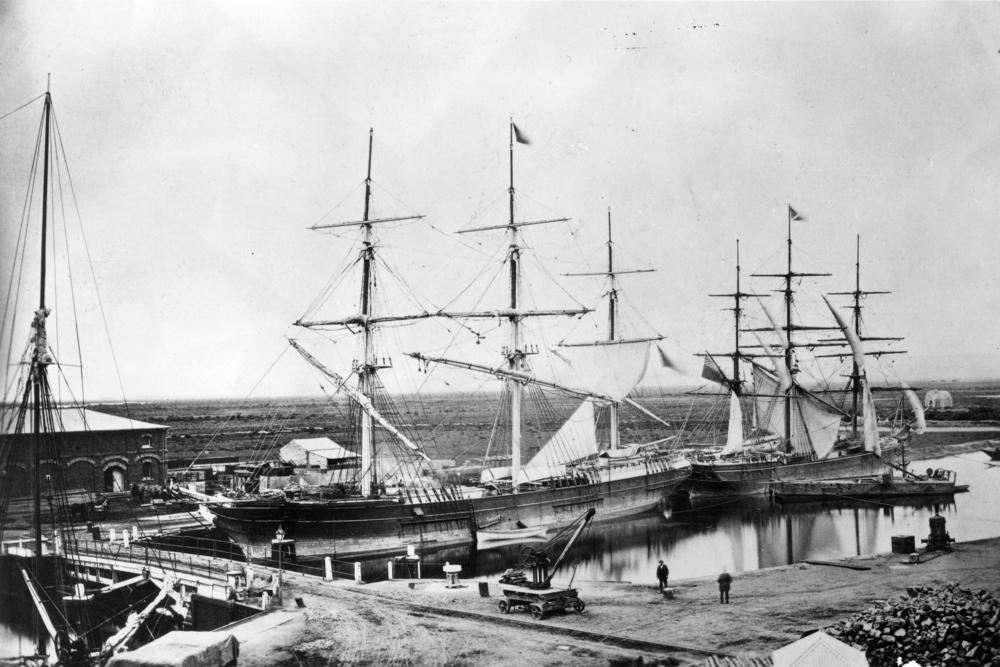
Pekina

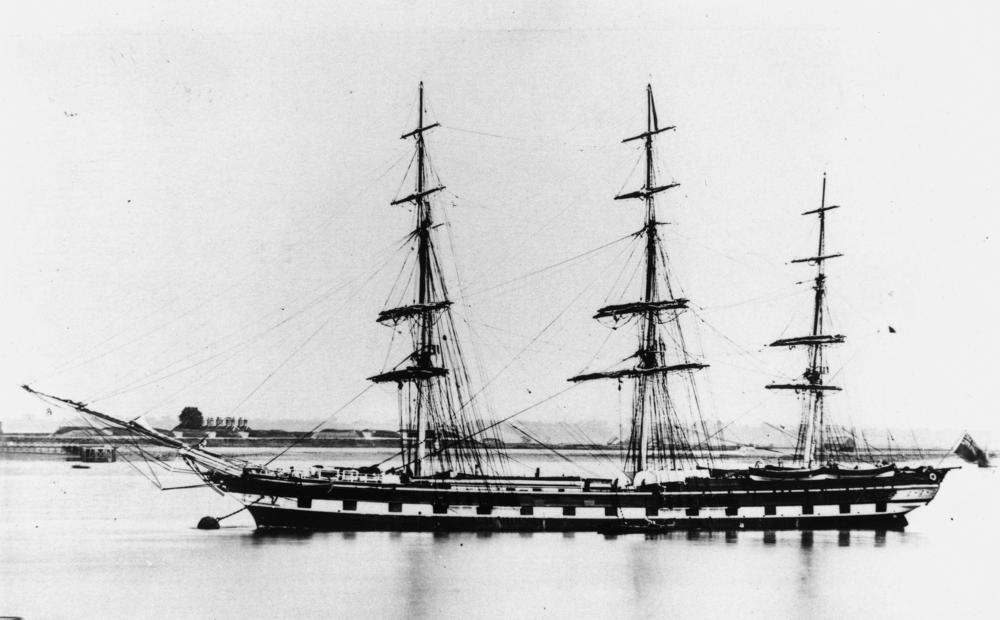
Parramatta

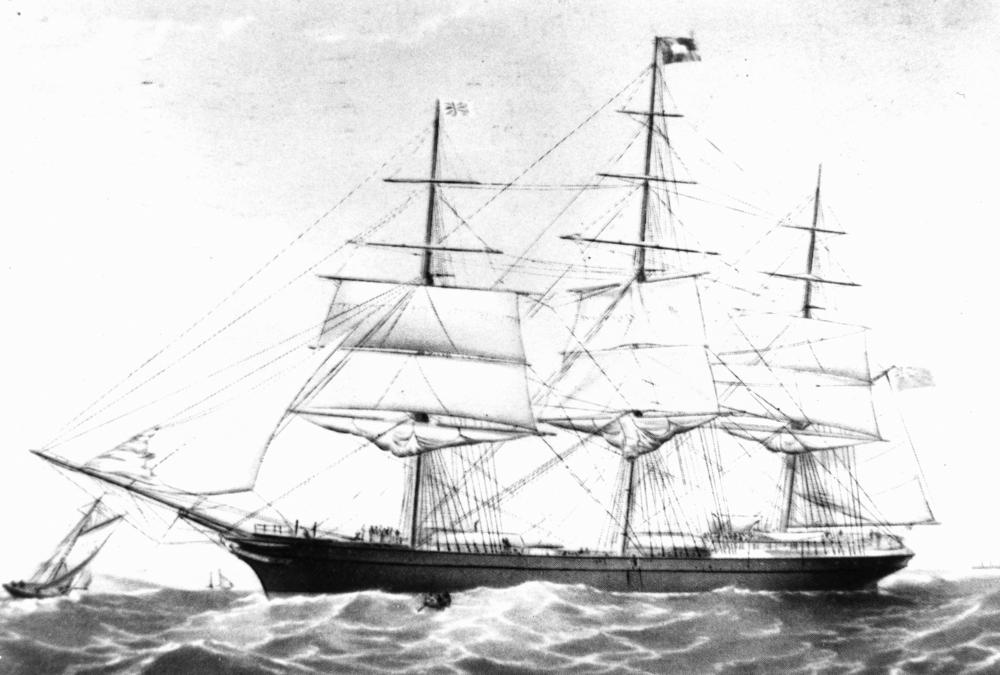
South Australian

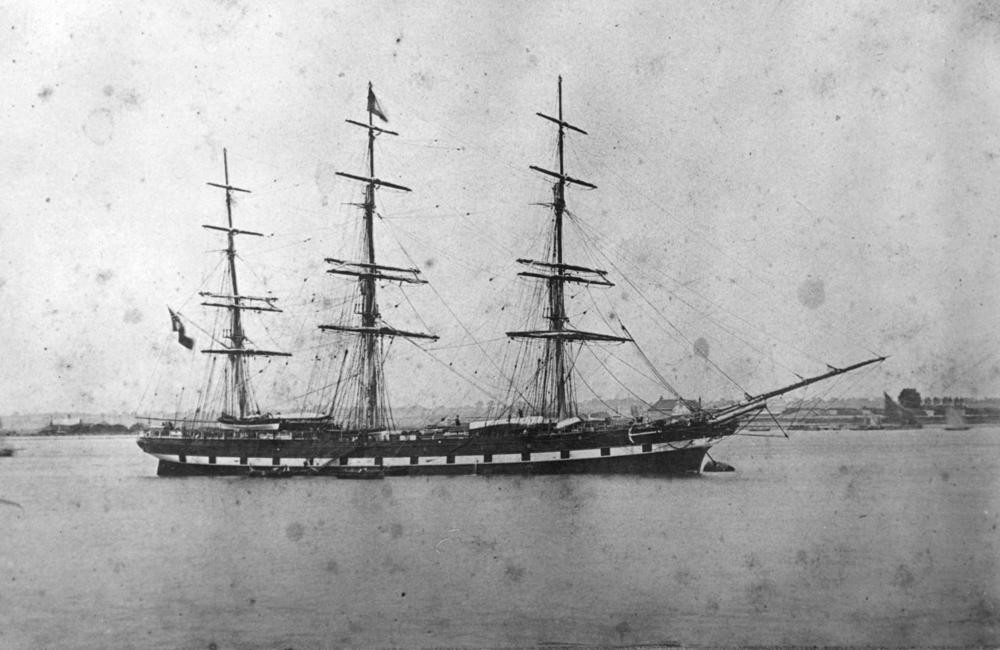
Hawkesbury

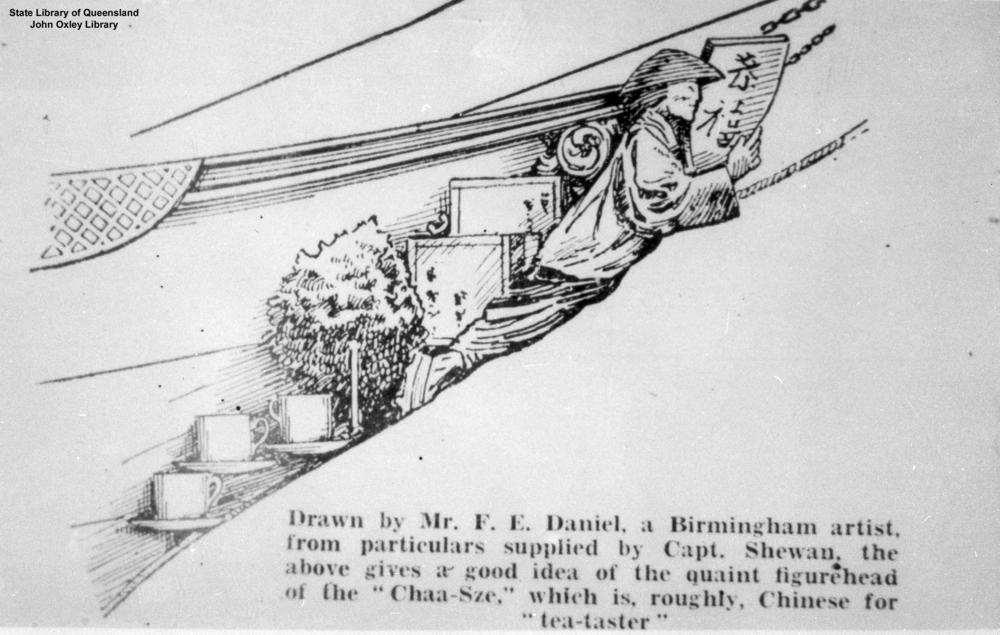
Figurehead of Chaa-Sze

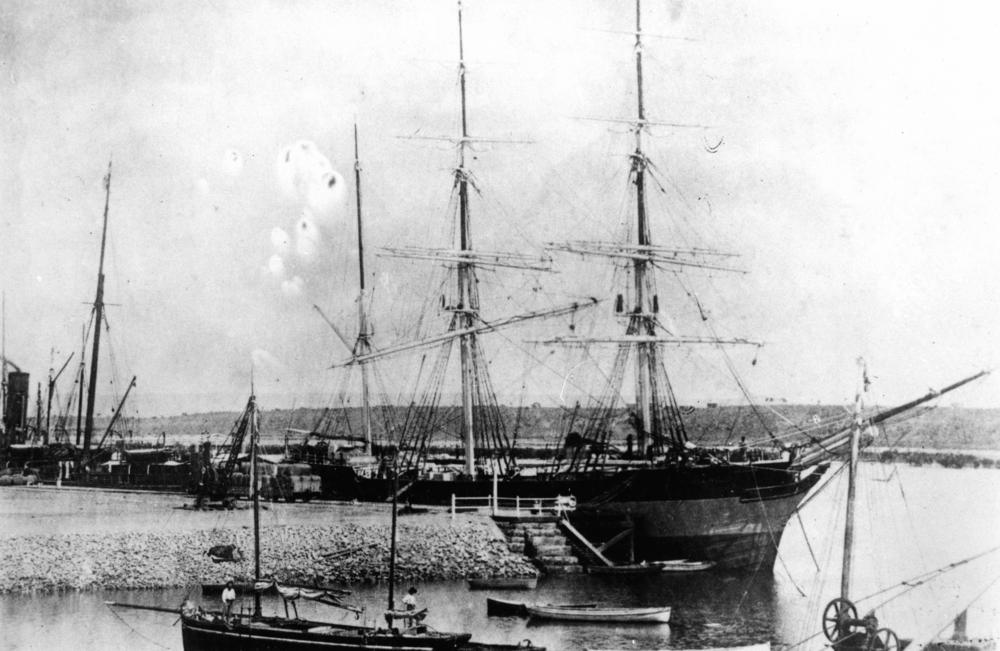
John Rennie

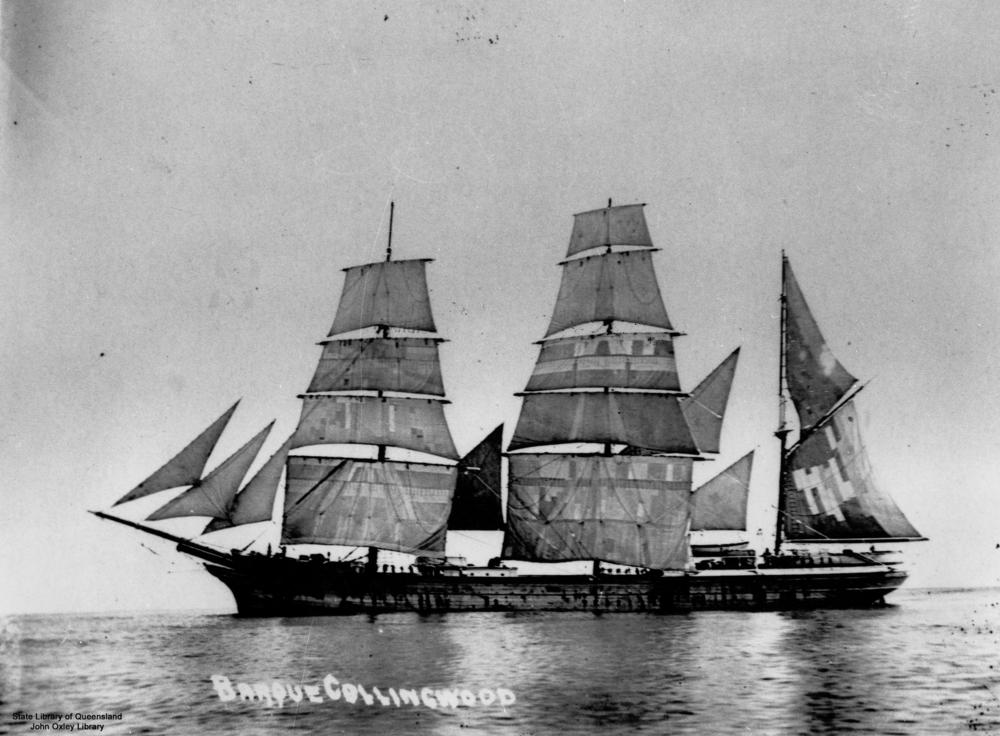
Barque Collingwood

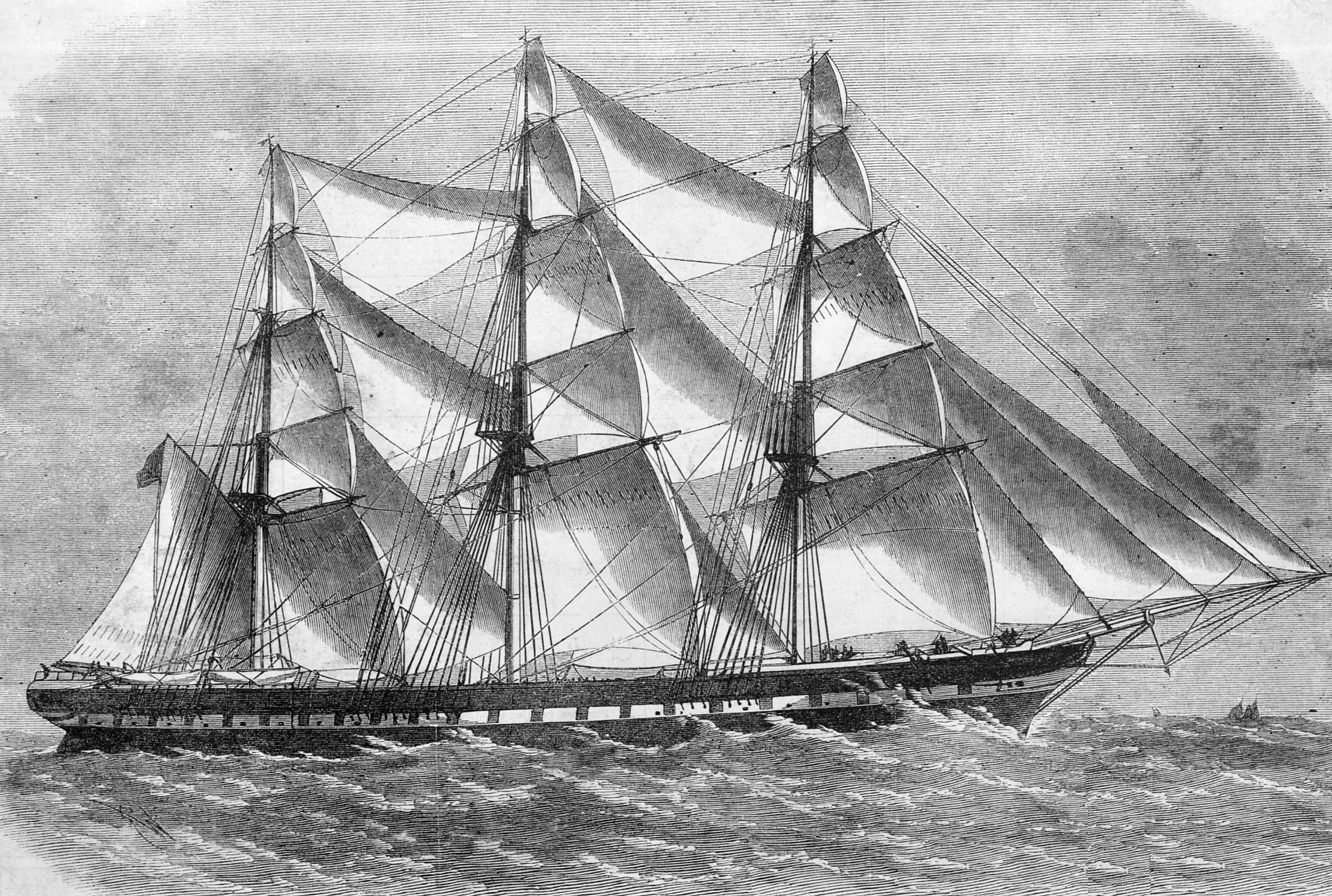
Sobraon

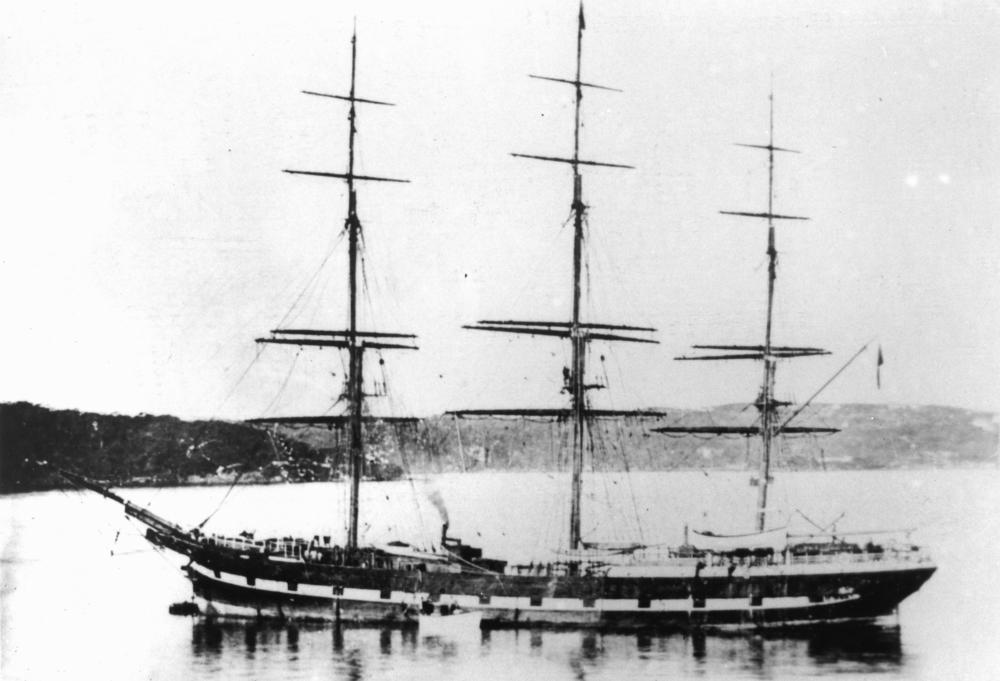
Rodney

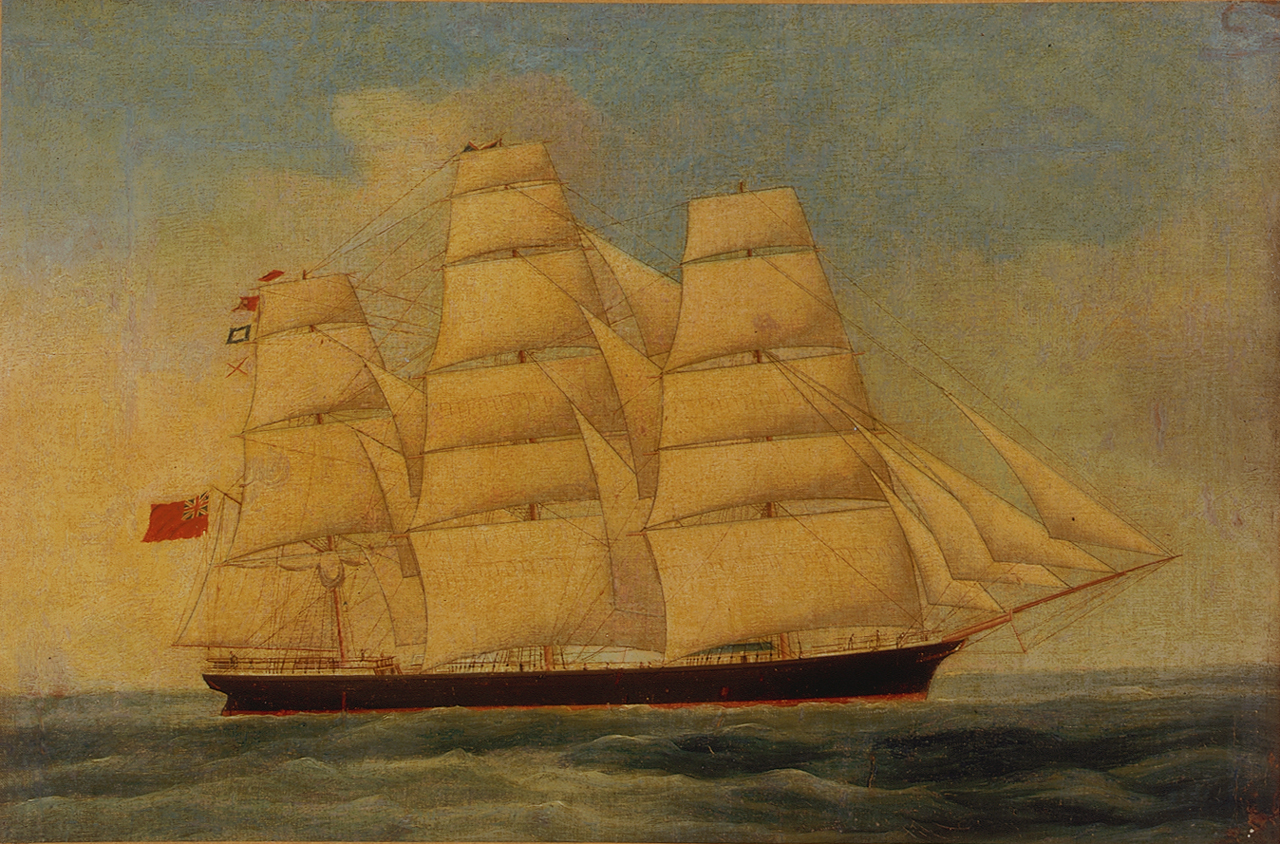
Duke of Atholl

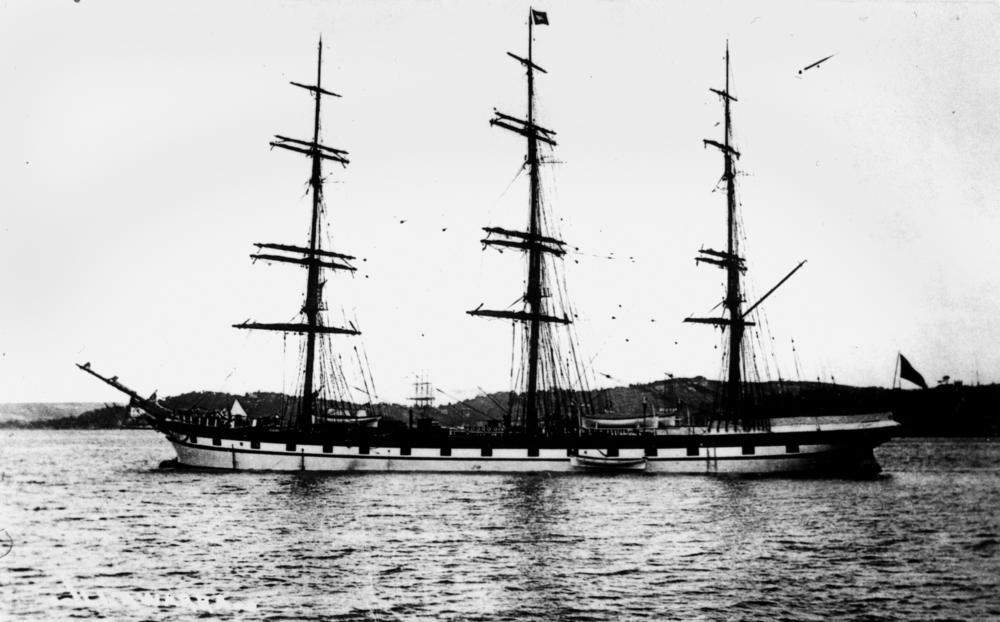
Illawarra

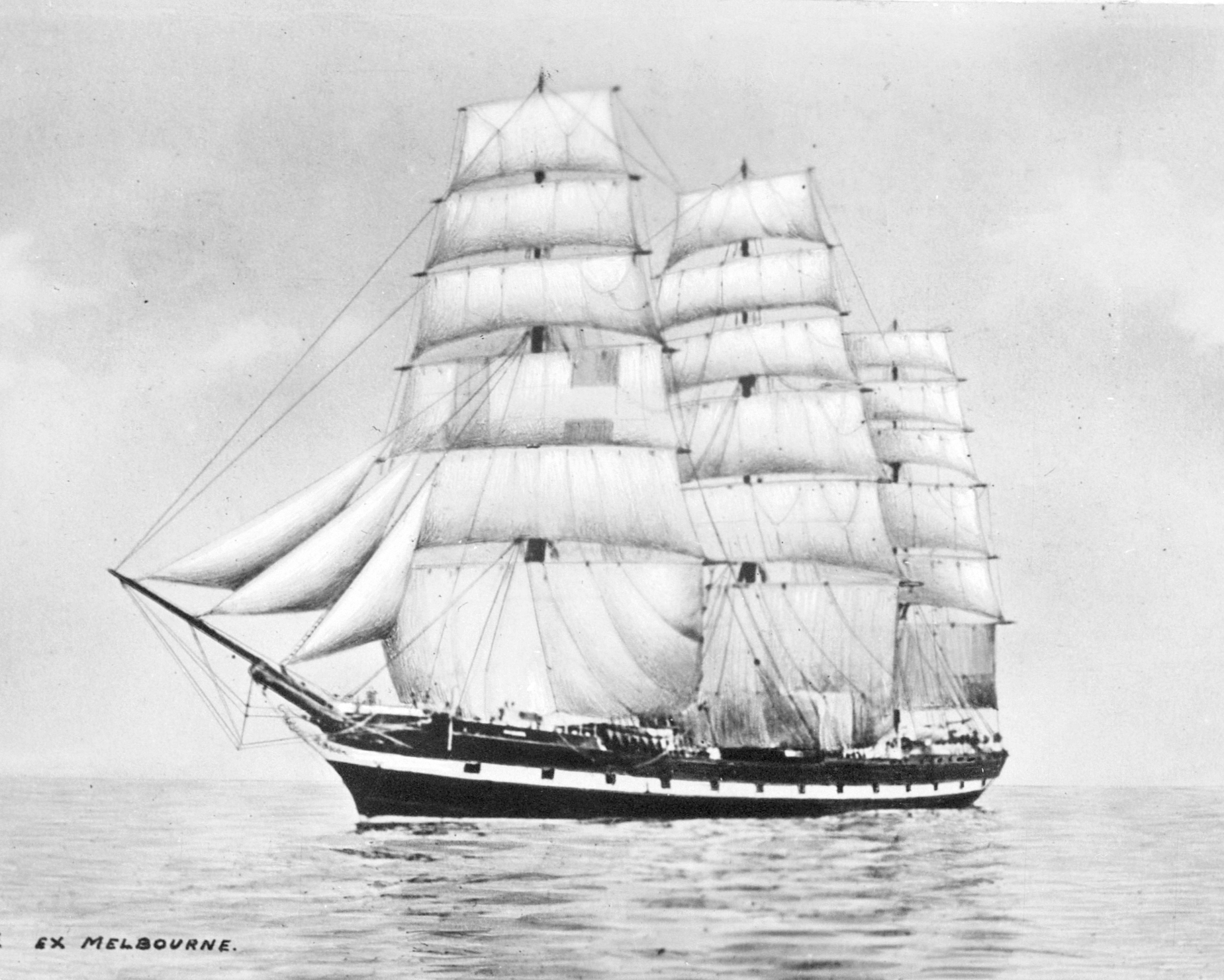
Macquarie

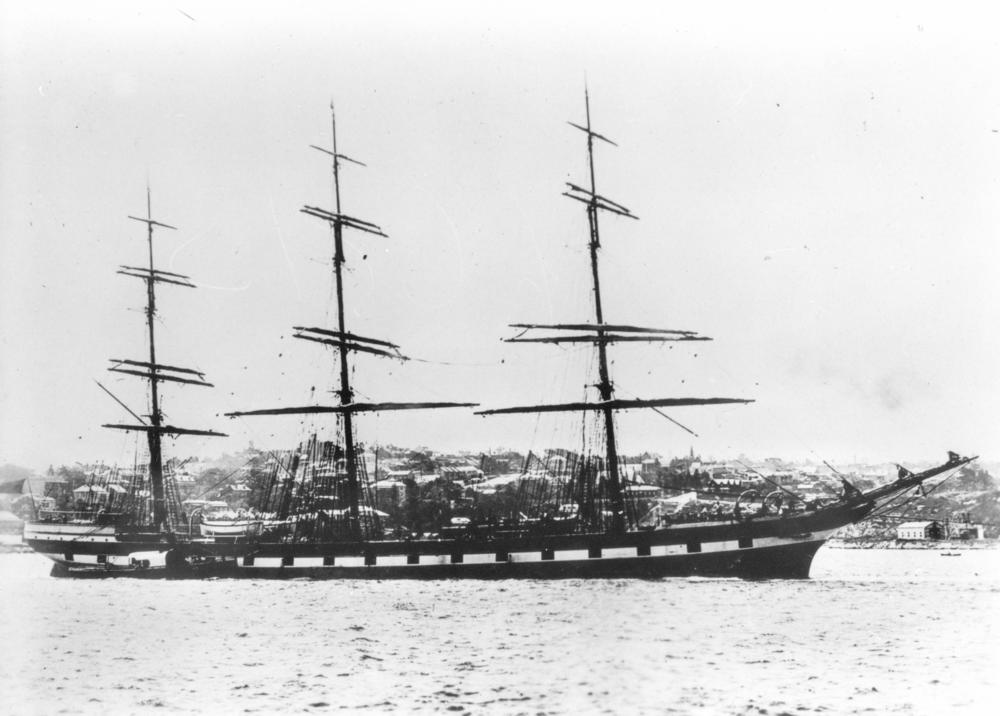
Tamar

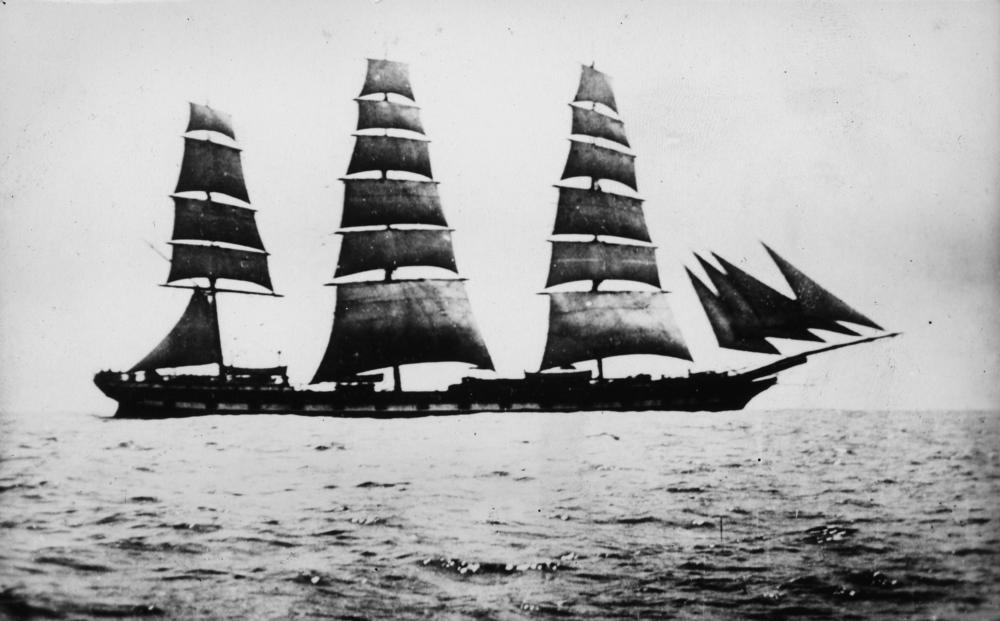
Harbinger

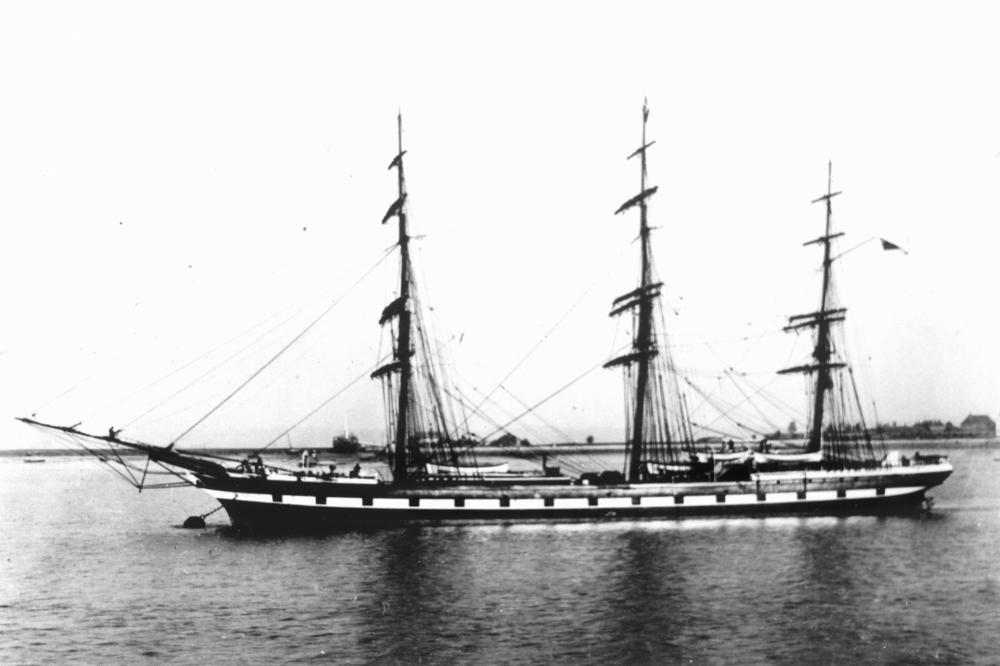
Hesperus

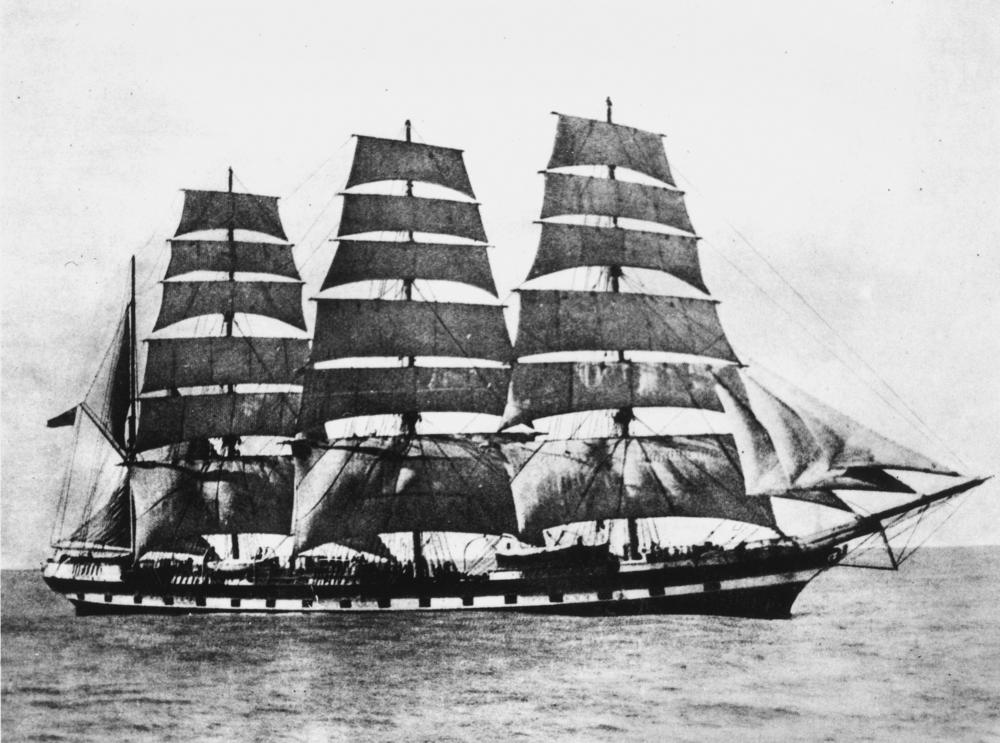
Port Jackson

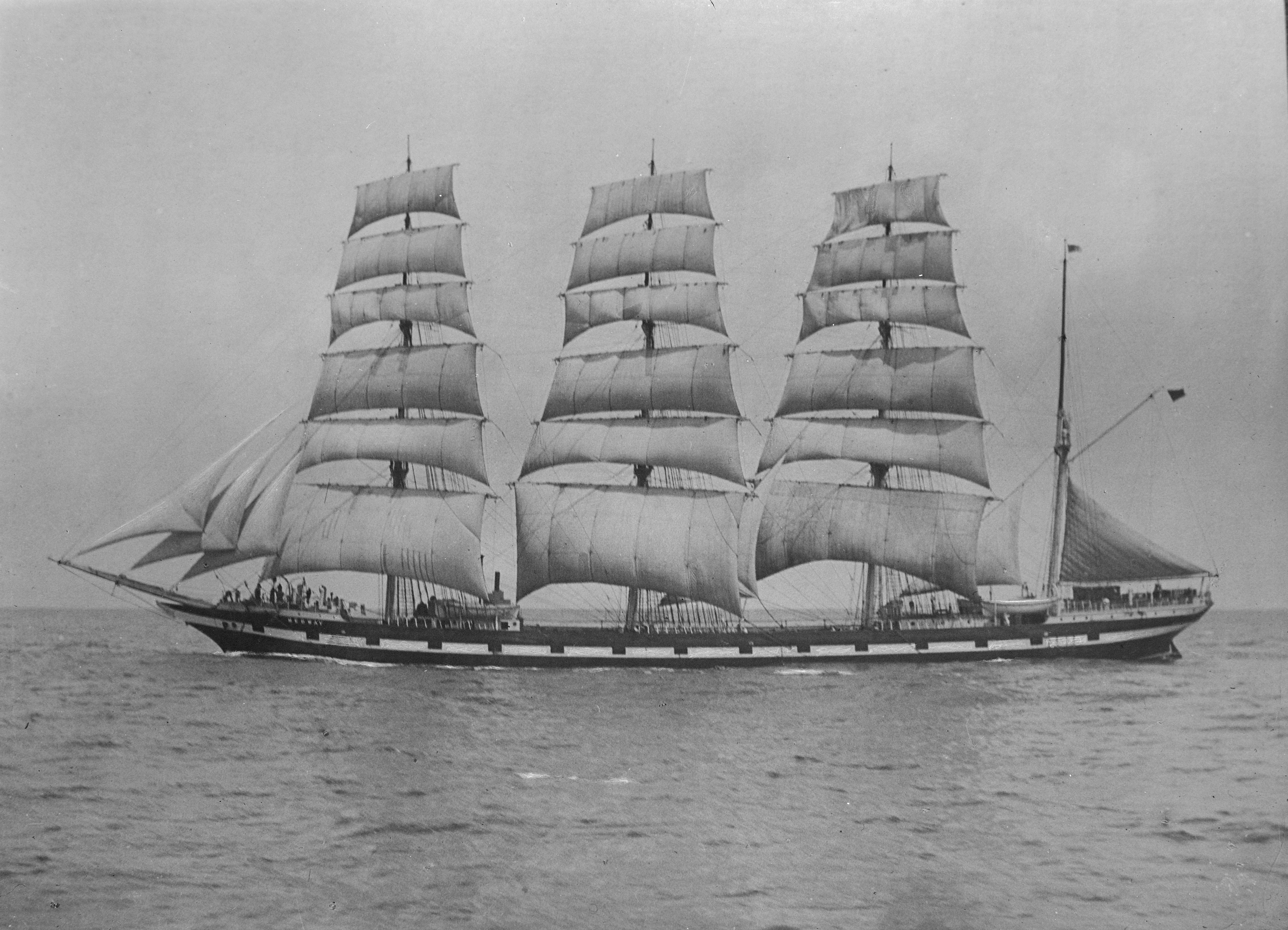
Medway
