= The Murray (clipper ship) =

Three-masted, wooden-hulled clipper built in 1861 and wrecked in 1884

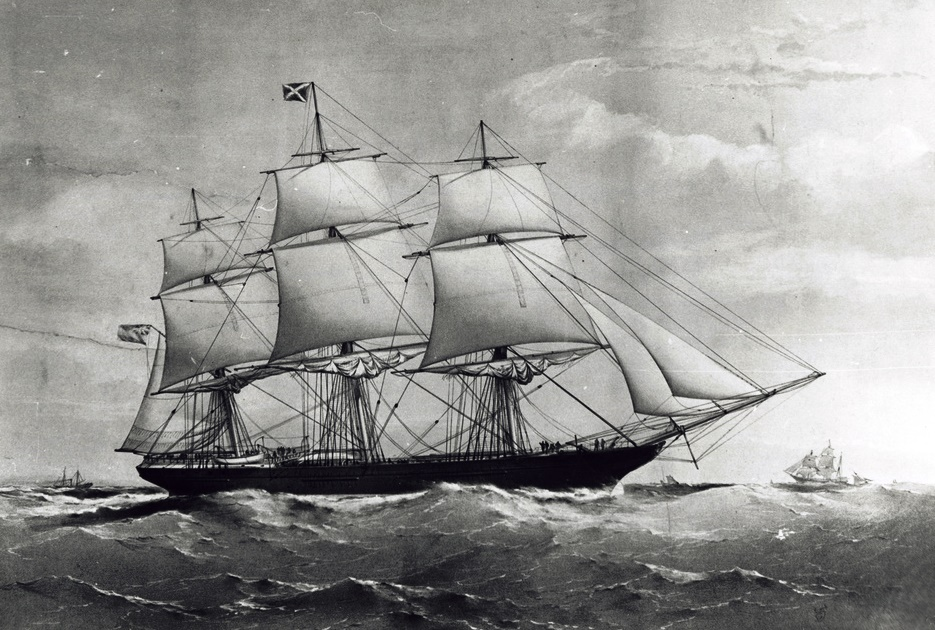
- Clipper The Murray, circa 1863

History
- Name: 1861: The Murray; 1880: Freia
- Owner: 1861: James Thompson & Co.; 1880: OL Roed
- Port of registry: 1861: (United Kingdom) Aberdeen; 1880: (Norway) Tønsberg
- Builder: Alexander Hall & Co, Aberdeen
- Yard number: 222
- Launched: 25 May 1861
- Maiden voyage: July 1861
- Identification: UK official number 29788; code letters QHCT
- Fate: Wrecked 1884

General characteristics
- Type: clipper
- Tonnage: 902 GRT
- Tons burthen: 1,019 tons bm
- Length: 193.7 ft (59.0 m)
- Beam: 33.2 ft (10.1 m)
- Depth: 20.2 ft (6.2 m)
- Propulsion: sail
- Sail plan: full rig

The Murray was a three-masted clipper ship that was built in Scotland in 1861 and lost off the coast of Sweden in 1884. For nearly 20 years, the Orient Line sailed between London and South Australia. In 1880, Norwegian owners bought her and renamed her Freia.

== Details ==
The Murray was the first ship built for the packet service of James Thompson & Co. of London, better known as the Orient Line. She was the last of their ships to be built entirely of wood. Alexander Hall & Co. built her in Aberdeen. Her registered length was 193.7 ft (59.0 m), her breadth was 33.2 ft (10.1 m), and her depth was 20.2 ft (6.2 m). Her tonnages were 1,019 BM and 902 GRT. She was launched on 25 May 1861.

Thompson registered The Murray at Aberdeen. Her United Kingdom official number was 29788, and her code letters were QHCT.

== Career as The Murray ==
Her first master was the highly regarded Captain John Legoe, whose wife named her The Murray. She sailed from Gravesend on her first voyage to Australia in July 1861.

She carried both passengers and cargo, making very fast times. In 1863, she left Plymouth on 15 July and arrived in Adelaide on 26 September, making the entire journey in 73 days, equal to the 1860 record of Yatala, considered the fastest on the route until the advent of Torrens.

James Norval Smart in 1867, William Begg in 1869–1872 (previously of Sebastian and Coonatto), and Thomas L. Wadham in 1874–1876 all succeeded Captain Legoe, formerly Celstial.

On the night of 26 May 1870 in mid-Atlantic between Brazil and West Africa, a lookout aboard The Murray saw a ship on fire, and Begg made his towards it. It was the Italian barque Mannin Barabino, out of Genoa, bound for the River Plate (Puerto Rico) with a cargo of spirits. The fire had started in the galley and swiftly engulfed the ship; the ship's boat was lowered but was soon overloaded and capsized, and the few survivors managed by clinging to the upturned boat or floating spars, and more than 120 were lost by fire or drowning. Captain Begg was awarded a silver medal by the Italian government for his part in the rescue.

== Career as Freia ==
In 1880, OL Roed of Norway bought The Murray, renamed her Freia, and registered her in Tønsberg.

In December 1884, Freia sailed from North Shields, England, with a cargo of coal for Vrengen, Norway. She was wrecked on the Koster Islands off the west coast of Sweden and lost with all hands.

== The Murray in art ==
The National Maritime Museum in Greenwich, London, holds a lithograph of the Clipper Ship 'The Murray' (1861) by Thomas Goldsworthy Dutton.

== Some other clippers on the route between England and South Australia ==
- City of Adelaide
- The Goolwa
- Hesperus
- Orient
- Rodney
- St Vincent
- South Australian
- Torrens
