= La Hogue (1855) =

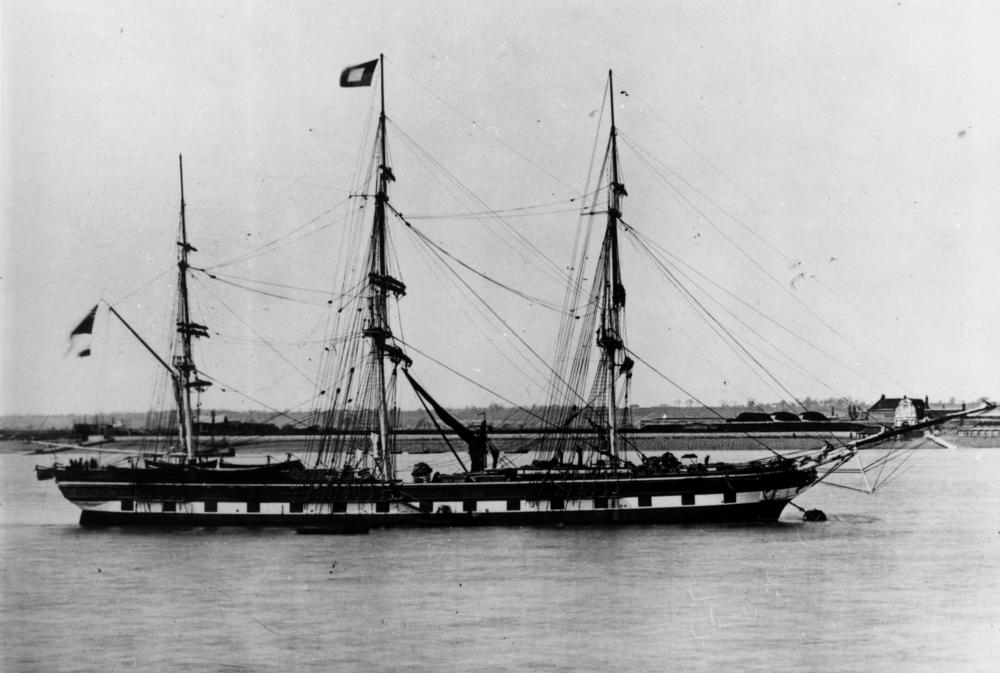
- La Hogue

History
- Name: La Hogue
- Owner: Devitt and Moore (1863–1886)
- Port of registry: British Reg. No. 26531
- Builder: James Laing, Sunderland
- Launched: 16 July 1855
- Identification: PLMR

General characteristics
- Tonnage: 1331 GRT, 1331 NRT
- Length: 226 ft (69 m)
- Beam: 35 ft (11 m)
- Draught: 22 ft 9 in (6.93 m)

La Hogue was a wooden full-rigged ship built by James Laing, Sunderland and launched in 1855 for Duncan Dunbar. She was used in the passenger and cargo trade to Australia and New Zealand. Her figurehead was a lion rampant supporting a shield with the St Andrew's Cross.

She was sold to Devitt and Moore, London in 1863 and continued her passenger and cargo trade to Australia and New Zealand. In 1886, she was sold to Thomas Hick, London and was used in the timber trade from the Baltic to London.
