= William Pile (shipbuilder) =

19th-century English shipbuilder

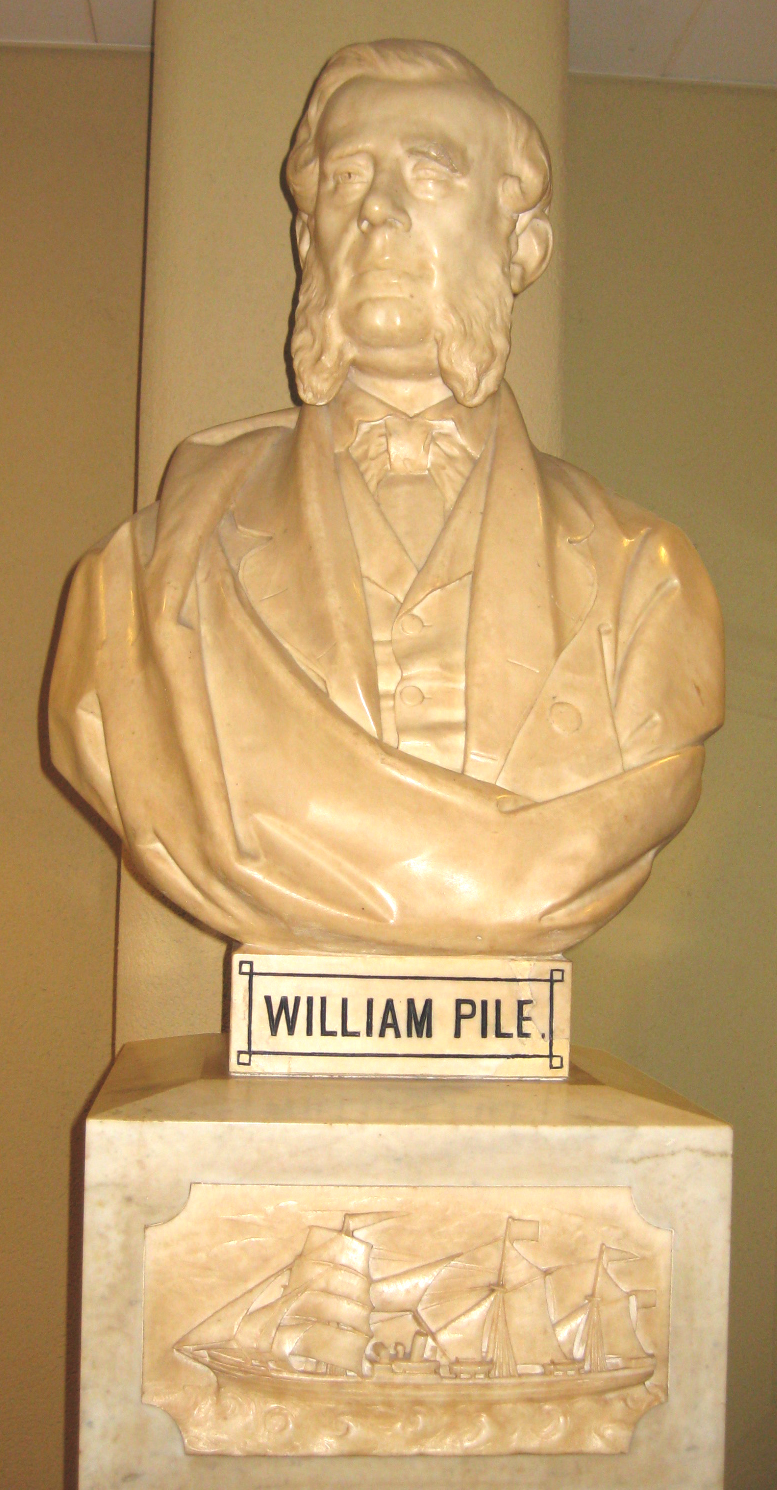
- Designer, shipwright and engine builder
- Born: 10 October 1823; Sunderland, England
- Died: 5 June 1873 (aged 49); Hotel, Bishopsgate Street, London, England
- Citizenship: British

William Pile (10 October 1823 – 5 June 1873) was a British shipbuilder. 'His genius was displayed in the building of ships, wherein he was not excelled. As Watt was great as a builder of engines; and Stephenson was great as a builder of railways; so William Pile was great as a builder of ships.'

He was the first to introduce the Clipper class of ship to the river Wear, Sunderland.

A testament to his art can be seen today, the Composite Clipper ship City of Adelaide. The ship was classed as "Experimental" by Lloyd's of London in 1864; it would be a few years before Lloyds would formalise the rules for constructing composite ships, the rules for which were used for the design and construction of the composite Clipper ship Cutty Sark.

His bust, now on display in the Sunderland Museum and Winter Gardens, was paid for by donations from his friends.

== Childhood ==
William Pile was born on 10 October 1823 at the White House, Low Southwick, Sunderland, son of William and Mary Pile and brother to John. (Note: His brother, John Pile, was born at Sunderland in 1820, and served his apprenticeship in Yarm. In 1852 he moved to Hartlepool to develop a shipyard in the newly opened Jackson's Dock. In 1889 the people of West Hartlepool presented him with a marble bust of himself, now in the collection at the Gray Art Gallery, Hartlepool, in recognition of the role he played in the industrial development of the town.) The house was surrounded by the shipyard of J. Mills, for whom his grandfather, another William Pile, was superintending the construction of wooden ships. He was baptised at St Peter's Church, Monkwearmouth on 28 October 1823.

Pile's ancestors, who were farmers, had arrived in Sunderland around 1770 from Rothbury, Northumberland. His grandfather was the first shipbuilder of the family, being so adept that he was made manager of a shipyard shortly after completing his apprenticeship. Preferring to manage rather than build on his own account, his ships were considered to be well-built and fast. He passed on his good knowledge of both the theory and practice of shipbuilding to many of people who subsequently built on the Wear, including William. Pile's father was also noted for his well-modelled ships and considered the first shipbuilder of his day.

At a very early age, Pile took great interest in everything connected with ships and could not be kept out of the shipyard. In 1823 he moved to Monkwearmouth. He began constructing little ships with paper sails from the age of five and from these he advanced to little yachts with cotton sails which he sailed in local ponds and streams. When asked by a friend, as to the shape of his yachts, he replied "Cod's head and mackerel tail", a shape favoured by British boat designers from as far back as the 18th century.

During the 1830s, Sunderland became the most important shipbuilding centre in the country, and by 1840 there were 65 shipyards on the river. It was at this time, that Pile walked the banks of the River Wear, visiting the shipyards and never growing tired of seeing ships in the various stages of construction. As he grew older he could tell the name of every ship belonging to Sunderland, and who built them. It was said of him after his death, that being born in a shipyard he was hardly ever out of one.

== Education ==
Pile disliked school and thus received little education. He was put to work very young. His character was more practical than theoretical, trusting more to their eye than the plan. He constantly watched the progress of the ships he had built, corresponding with their captains. His custom was to seek information where he thought it was to be got, and to get it he used periodically to visit the largest ports of the United Kingdom.

== Shipwright training ==
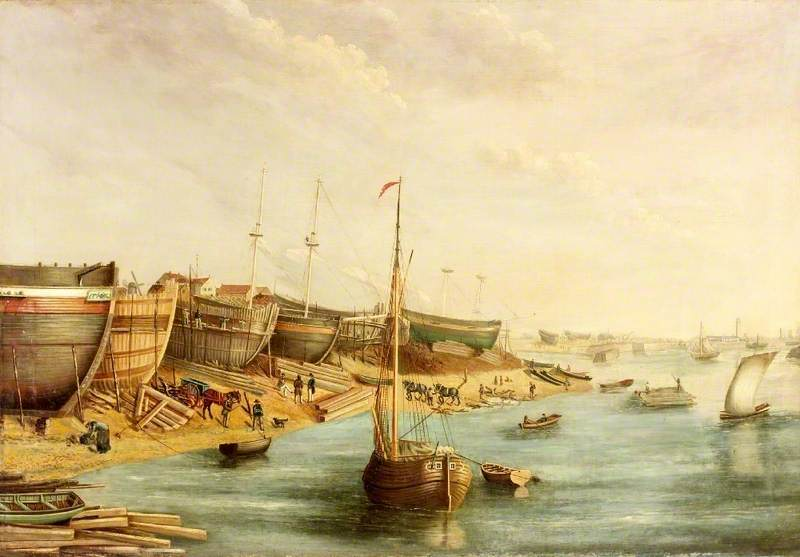
William Pile's Shipyard, North Sands, Sunderland

Pile's mother and or father apparently did not appreciate his shipbuilding disposition and preferred him to work in a ropery. This employment however did not last long, as he ended his engagement by running away from it after six weeks. His family must have relented as it is recorded that he served his time as a shipwright with his father.

In 1836, Pile's family moved to Stockton-on-Tees. At the age of 18, an accident caused his right hand to be nearly cut in two; this crippled him to a great extent for the rest of his life. On his recovery, he went to a shipbuilder in Monkwearmouth to complete his apprenticeship. There his talent was recognised; he was promoted to foreman and was in charge of a yard with a large number of men.

He continued with his relations until 1848 when he left their yard to commence on his own account. When his brother moved to Hartlepool, in 1853, William took the whole of the establishment.

== Death ==
William Pile died on 5 June 1873, aged 49. He was suddenly seized with contractions of the bowels and died after suffering severely for a few hours. He was survived by his wife and six surviving children. He had married Isabella Rickaby, of Coniscliffe, near Darlington in 1849.

Pile's funeral was conducted at St Mary's Roman Catholic Church, Sunderland. The church was crowded and many were unable to gain admission; the funeral procession was over two miles in length and comprised over 3000 people. The Sunderland Times said that "His genius was displayed in the building of ships, wherein he was not excelled. As Watt was great as a builder of engines; and Stephenson was great as a builder of railways; so William Pile was great as a builder of ships."

== Accolades ==
John Thompson writes of what he saw on the river Wear in the year 1850:

At this period a complete revolution in shipbuilding took place, when both Mr. John Pile and his brother William got in full swing. Their mode of construction eclipsed all that had ever previously taken place on the Wear, and even in any other part of the country ... their vessels were acknowledged, and held by many, to be the swiftest sailing vessels in the China trade, known as Opium Clippers and Tea Clippers.

Thompson also noted that the Pile brothers were among the first, at all events, in this river, to introduce long ships with beam in proportion. Their vessels were of large dimensions, and the items of their fittings enormously costly, and they won for the builders the high name they attained in every quarter of the globe.

It was here the first improvements in modelling took place, the old-fashioned counter was abolished, and all the planking turned up to the arch-board; the old-fashioned stern-frame and transoms were done away with, and the vessel framed all round the stern. The first clipper stem was her put up that was seen on the Wear, and was, as it was then termed, turned inside out and upside down, and which is still continued by the builders on the Wear up to the present day.(1874). Pile was the first to introduce the Clipper class of vessel to Sunderland and by his skill in building them he gained recognition in the nautical world.

== Ships ==
Pile built more than a hundred wooden ships, a similar number made of iron, and a number of composite ships. Although many of the iron ships were steamers, it was his sailing ships that brought renown to his name.

The following are some of the ships built by Pile:

Vessel Name	Original Rig	Material	Owners / Agents	Date Built	Period Owned	Gross tonnage	Net Tonnage	Length Overall (feet)	Breadth (feet)	Depth (feet)
Lizzie Webber				1852						
Crest of the Wave				1853						
Lammermuir	Ship	Composite	John Willis & Son	1856	1856–63	952	952	178	34	22
Windsor Castle	ship	Composite	Richard Green	1857	1857–84	1075	1075	195.5		
Kelso				1861						
City of Adelaide	Ship	Composite	Devitt and Moore	1864	1864–87	791	696	176.8	33.2	18.8
St Vincent	Ship	Composite	Devitt and Moore	1865	1865–87	892	–	190	35	18.9
Maitland				1865						
Jumna	Ship	Iron	Norse Line	1867	1867–98	1048	1048	208.6	34.1	20.1
Poonah	Ship	Composite	Tyser & Haviside	1867		1199				
South Australian	Ship	Composite	Devitt and Moore	1868	1868–87	1078	1049	201	36	20.1
Hawkesbury	Ship	Composite	Devitt and Moore	1868	1868–88	1179	1120	203	36.2	21.5
Syria	Ship	Iron	Nourse Line	1868	1868–84	1010	1010	207.7	34.1	20.8
Outalpa	Ship	Iron	Devitt and Moore	1869	1871–81	717	676	187.7	30.6	18
Miako	Barque	Composite	Killick Martin & Company	1869	1869–85	536	516	160	30.2	17.2
Osaka	Barque	Composite	Killick Martin & Company	1869	1869–85	546	527	165	30.2	17.3
Rodney	Ship	Iron	Devitt and Moore	1874	1874–96	1519	1447	235.6	38.4	22
