= Hesperus (clipper ship) =

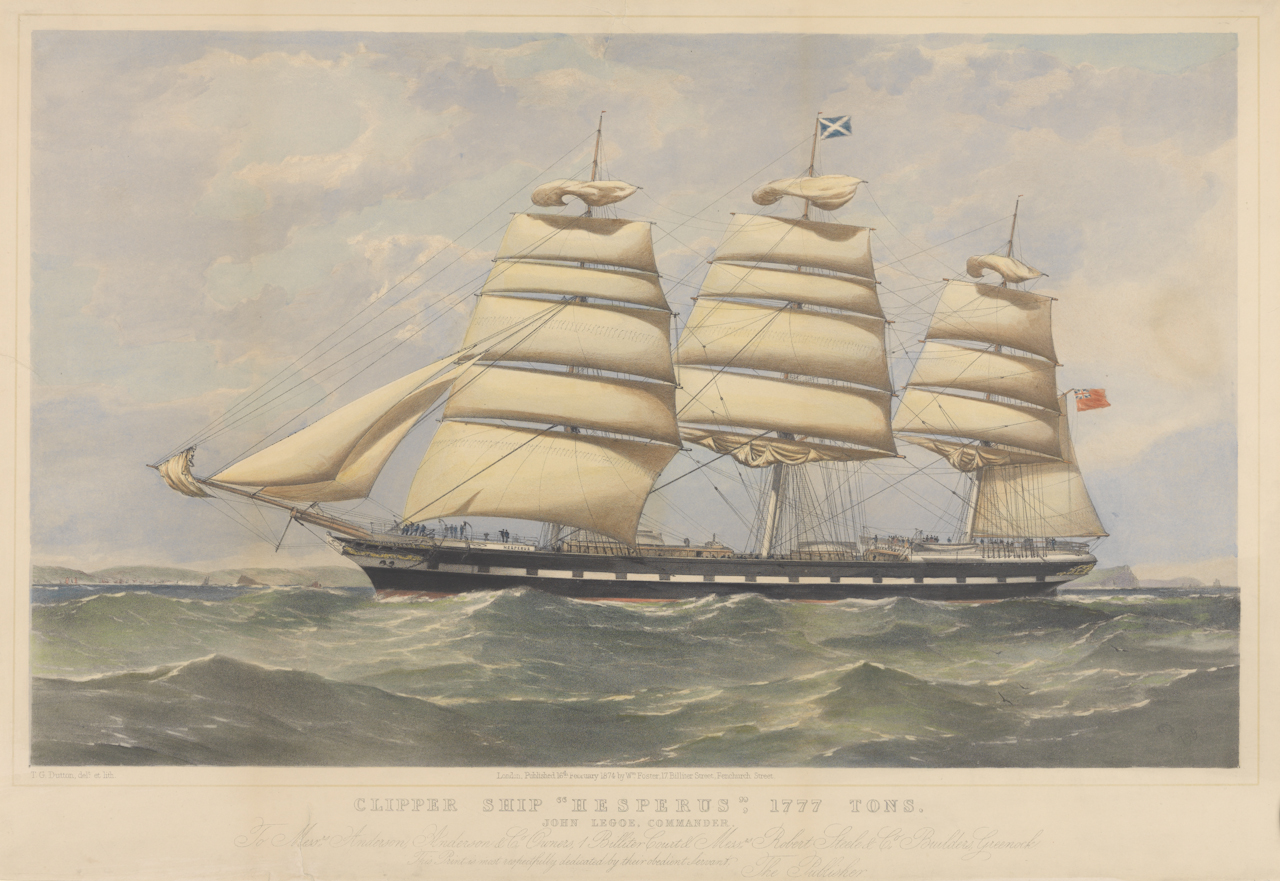
- Hesperus under way

History
- Name: 1873: Hesperus; 1899: Grand Duchess Maria Nikolaevna; 1921: Silvana
- Namesake: 1873: Hesperus; 1899: Grand Duchess Maria Nikolaevna of Russia
- Owner: 1874: James Anderson; 1890: Joseph Moore; 1899: Board of Trustees, Odessa Navigation School; 1921: London & Foreign Trading Corp, Ltd
- Operator: 1874: Anderson, Thompson & Co; 1890: Devitt & Moore's Ocean Training Ships Ltd; 1921: William JM Bell
- Port of registry: 1874: (United Kingdom of Great Britain and Ireland) London; 1880: (United Kingdom of Great Britain and Ireland) Aberdeen; 1890: (United Kingdom of Great Britain and Ireland) London; 1899: (Russian Empire) Odessa; 1921: (United Kingdom of Great Britain and Ireland) London
- Builder: Robert Steele & Company, Greenock
- Yard number: 82
- Launched: 20 November 1873
- Completed: 1874
- Identification: UK official number 68500; code letters MNDL
- Fate: Scrapped 1923

General characteristics
- Type: iron-hulled clipper
- Tonnage: 1,777 GRT, 1,574 NRT
- Length: 262.2 ft (79.9 m)
- Beam: 39.5 ft (12.0 m)
- Depth: 23.5 ft (7.2 m)
- Propulsion: sail
- Sail plan: full rig
- Notes: sister ship: Aurora

Hesperus was an iron-hulled, three-masted, passenger clipper ship that was built in Scotland in 1874 and scrapped in Italy in 1923. She was built for Thompson and Anderson's Orient Line service between Great Britain and South Australia.

In 1890 she was converted into a training ship. In 1899 she was sold to the Russian Empire and renamed Grand Duchess Maria Nikolaevna. In 1921 she was bought by British owners and renamed Silvana.

== Building ==
Robert Steele & Company built Hesperus in Greenock, Scotland, launching her on 20 November 1873 and completing her in 1874. She was built to replace Thompson and Anderson's clipper Yatala, which had been wrecked in the English Channel in 1872. Captain John Legoe, who had been Master of Yatala, supervised Hesperus' construction.

Hesperus was the first Orient Line ship to have an iron hull. Her registered length was 262.2 feet (79.9 m), her beam was 39.5 feet (12.0 m) and her depth was 23.5 feet (7.2 m). Her tonnages were 1,777 GRT and 1,574 NRT. She had three masts and was built as a full-rigged ship.

Her first owner was James Anderson of Thompson and Anderson, who registered her in London. Her United Kingdom official number was 68500 and her code letters were MNDL.

== Career ==
John Legoe was Hesperus' first Master. On her maiden voyage she took 340 migrants to Adelaide. On the voyage, someone aboard produced a slim and modest newspaper called The Hesperian.

Her last voyage under Captain Legoe brought his wife, daughter and three sons to settle in South Australia. She left London on 18 July 1877 and reached Adelaide shortly before 15 October. Other passengers on that voyage were Colonel Downes, for many years military commandant in Adelaide, and later in Victoria, and C. Angel, later an Adelaide stockbroker.

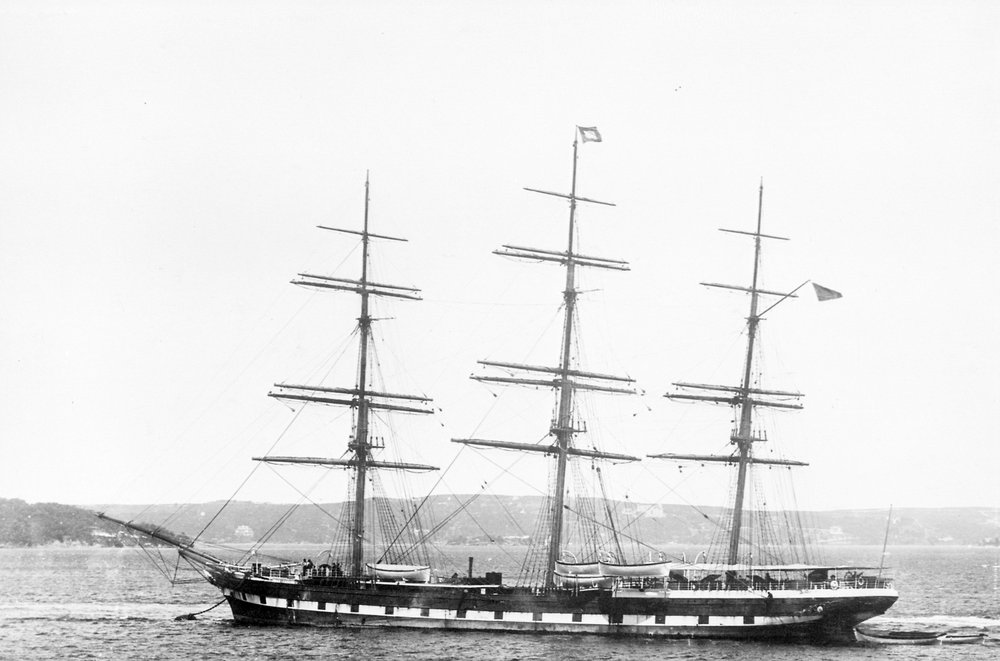
Hesperus in about 1885

The Orient Line sent Captain Thomas Row Harry to command Hesperus on her return voyage. He remained master of Hesperus until 1886.

The ship's log book, the last prepared by the captain, was a prized possession of one of Captain Legoe's sons.

In 1890 Joseph Moore of Devitt bought Hesperus, had her converted into a training ship, and registered her in Aberdeen Harbour. Captain John Howard Barrett became her Master.

In 1899 the Imperial Russian Government bought Hesperus as a sail training ship on the Black Sea. She was renamed Grand Duchess Maria Nikolaevna after the newborn third daughter of Tsar Nicholas II and Tsarina Alexandra, and was registered in Odessa. In 1913 Swan, Hunter & Co on the River Tyne in England re-fitted the ship for her Russian owners.

In 1921 the London Steamship and Trading Corporation bought Grand Duchess Maria Nikolaevna, renamed her Silvana and registered her in London. She sailed from Birkenhead in merchant service but was commercially unsuccessful. By September 1922 she had been seized for debt. She was scrapped in Genoa in 1923.

== Some other clippers on the England to Adelaide run ==
- City of Adelaide
- Coonatto
- The Goolwa
- The Murray
- Orient
- Rodney
- St Vincent
- South Australian
- Yatala

== Sister ship ==
Hesperus had a sister ship, Aurora, that Robert Steele & Co launched in 1874. She was lost near the Azores in 1875 when her cargo of wool caught fire. Her Master, Adam Johnston, was cleared of blame.
