= John Legoe =

John Legoe (c. 1824 – 24 March 1895) was a ship's captain, associated with the sailing ships Celestial, The Murray, Yatala and Hesperus, before settling in South Australia, where he and his family were notable citizens.

== History ==
John Legoe was born at Trefresa Farm near the village of Rock in the Parish of St Minver, North Cornwall. Rock lies on the eastern shore of the estuary of the River Camel. Opposite, on the western shore lies the small port of Padstow. He went to sea at an early age, working his way up the order (and gaining his Master Mariner's certificate from the Board of Trade in 1856) until he was put in charge of Celestial, a ship of 438 tons, on the China trade route. It was in this service that he first visited Australia, sailing from Foo Choo Foo or Foo Chow (Fuzhou) in April 1858.

His next landfall in Australia was in command of the clipper The Murray in July 1861. He brought her three more times, in 1862, 1863 and 1864.

He was appointed commodore of the Orient Line company, in charge of the new clipper Yatala which made her first voyage to Adelaide in 1865, arriving 27 October after a journey of 88 days.

The following year, Adelaide's two favourite skippers, Captains Bruce and Legoe and their respective clipper ships City of Adelaide and Yatala were due to leave Port Adelaide on the same day, 27 December 1866 and public expectation was that they would make a race of it. Large and partisan crowds were at the docks to see them off; Yatala getting away around 6 am, and City of Adelaide some five hours later, owing to some oversight. At the Cape the difference had been whittled down to three hours The lead see-sawed between the two, but the larger Yatala reached The Downs a day ahead of the City which was subject to another day's delay in berthing. This was David Bruce's last voyage in command of the City; his son John Bruce (who married a daughter of George French Angas) succeeded him.

Yatala made five more voyages to Adelaide: 1867, 1868, 1869, 1870 and 1871, all in good time with no real difficulties. Once, according to a report difficult to verify, Legoe ran up the Port River under her own sail and safely berthed after a record voyage from London of 64 days.

The 1871 return voyage of Yatala was not so felicitous, the ship being grounded off Cape Grisnez in heavy weather shortly after midnight on 28 March 1872, after having mistaken the Cape Grisnez light for that of Beachy Head on the other side of the Channel. There were no deaths or injuries, the passengers sheltering at the nearby town of Audresselles. Much of the valuable cargo (mostly wool) was saved, but the ship subsequently broke up and was totally lost. The Board of Enquiry found Capt. Legoe fully responsible but in view of his long and faultless service and high character was given the relatively light sentence of six months suspension of his Certificate.

He supervised building of Hesperus at Greenock, Scotland, completed 1873, to replace Yatala. She was chartered by Francis S. Dutton, Agent-General for South Australia, to bring out migrants to Adelaide, leaving Plymouth on 23 February 1874 and arriving 10 May 1874, a voyage of 77 days. The next voyage, leaving England July 1875 had William Gumming at the helm. Legoe took the next, which left June 1876. His last voyage was in charge of the Hesperus, on which brought his own family from Cornwall to settle in South Australia, left 19 July 1877 and arrived in October.

Legoe was in 1877 a founding member of the South Australian Stevedoring Company, other members being Capt. William Begg, Joseph Stone, and Charles A. Brown.

In August 1882 he was appointed a warden member of the newly formed Marine Board, representing the underwriters, and remained a member until his death. In June 1883 he was the sole dissenter against the condemnation of Capt. Marshall for the Investigator incident, and steadfast in his defence of the ship's master. Captain Hobbs, a fellow warden who had worked under Legoe, remembered him as being always considerate of those working under him, and was greatly respected.

== Family ==
John Legoe (c. 1824 – 24 March 1895) married Grace Lenn Rogers (c. 1832 – 21 September 1910). Their family included:

- Grace Lenn Legoe ( – 20 March 1944) married stockbroker Charles (James Henthorn) Morton Todd ( – 21 December 1916) on 15 June 1882. They had a home at 62 LeFevre Terrace, North Adelaide.
- John Rogers Legoe (c. 1861 – 7 April 1932) may have attended J. L. Young's Adelaide Educational Institution, and was employed by the Bank of South Australia in London for a few years from 1877, then in Adelaide for two years before joining Green & Co., land agents of Pirie Street. He was then appointed manager of the Port Adelaide branch of the Commercial Bank of Australia, followed by Melbourne then Sydney. He was a member of the Sydney Stock Exchange 1909–1930.
- (George) Glen Legoe (7 January 1864 – 7 July 1951) was educated at J. L. Young's Adelaide Educational Institution, Parkside. He joined the Commercial Bank of South Australia in 1879, when H. D. O'Halloran was manager. He joined with G. & R. Wills & Co. in 1882, then in June 1889 with Sydney Wilcox bought out the interests of William Mofflin in the business of W. Mofflin & Co. He was associated with George Wilcox & Co. for 38 years and for 20 with the Executor Trustee and Agency Co. Limited. He had a home at Victoria Avenue, Unley Park which he subdivided in 1922, and a grazing property at Binnum, South Australia, which may have been contiguous with properties owned by several of the Wilcox family. He married Jessie Dean ( – 1938) in 1893; their children included:

- Esther Lenn Legoe (1898–1990) married Denis Gordon Baylis (1901–1973) before 1928, had a home at Medindie, later of Balmoral, Victoria. She was the first woman to study architecture at Adelaide University, though she never practised,
- Richard John Legoe (1900 – 7 June 1958) married Mary Isobel Barr Smith ( –1990) on 5 November 1924. Mary was the third daughter of T. E. Barr-Smith and Mary Isobel "Molly" Barr Smith CBE (1863–1941) of "Birksgate", Glen Osmond.
- Nancy Grace Legoe (1901 – 14 May 1998) married Dr. John Edwin Digby "Edwin" Crozier (1900–1979) on 11 August 1926

- Digby Glen Crozier MP (16 May 1927 – )

- Mary Alathea "Thea" Legoe (1906 – 15 September 1922)

- William "Willie" Legoe (c. 1868 – 8 June 1926) married Margaret Mary "Daisy" Dobbin ( – ) on 9 April 1907. He, too, was educated at AEC, Parkside, then the German College, Hahndorf, and St. Peter's College. He served with the Bank of Adelaide for a few years, then joined G. & R. Wills & Co. and later farmed at Rendelsham, Mount Gambier and Riverton, where Glen Legoe and Frederick Norton had the extensive Wooroora vineyard and large cellars, abandoned 1919.

== Gallery ==
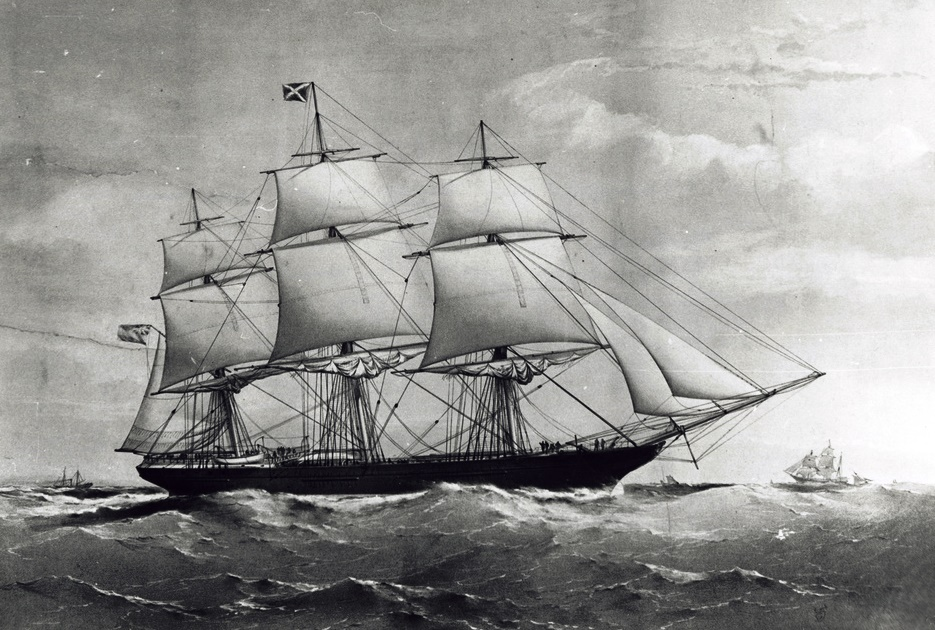
Clipper The Murray c. 1863

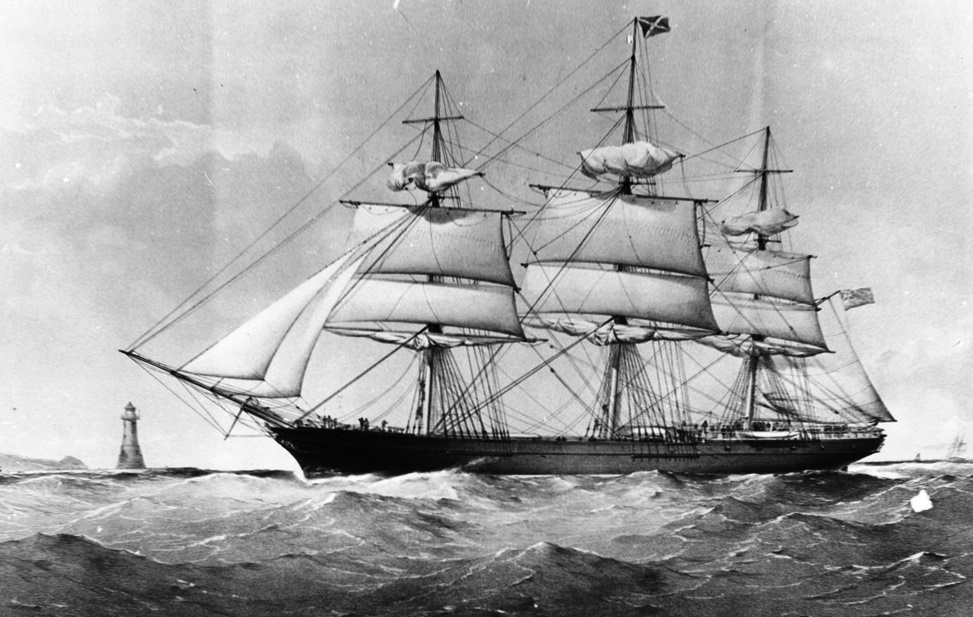
Clipper Yatala c. 1865

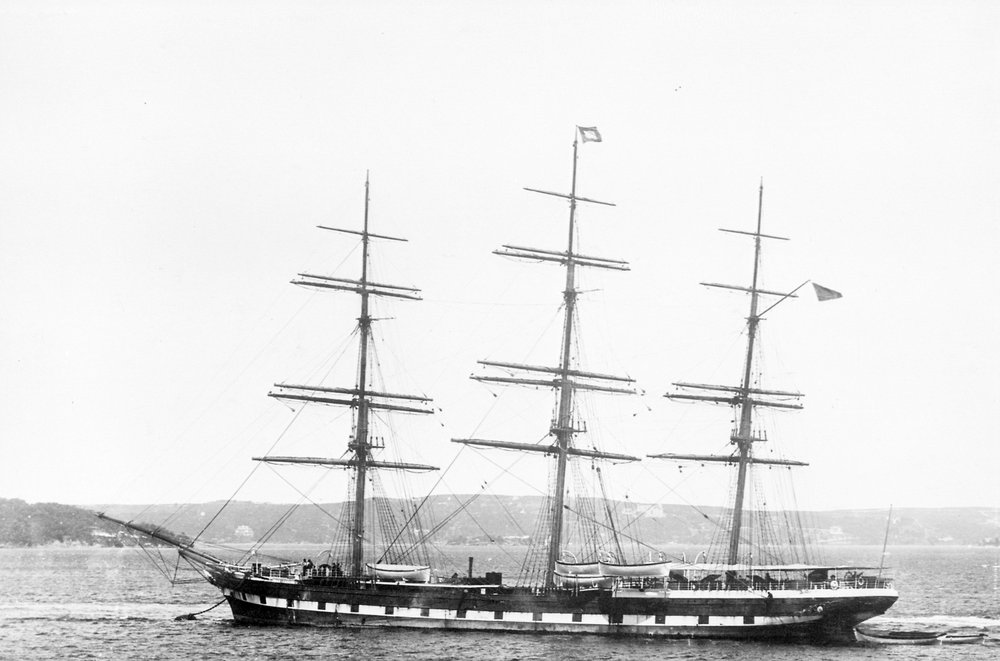
Ship Hesperus c. 1885
