= William Begg =

Scottish-born Australian captain and privateer (1821–1889)

William Begg (31 May 1821 – 26 July 1889) was a ship's captain in the merchant navy and as a privateer who made many voyages between England, Africa, East Asia and Adelaide, South Australia, where he later settled and had success as a businessman in Port Adelaide.

== History ==
Begg was born in Montrose, Scotland, the son of Captain Robert Begg, was apprenticed as ship's carpenter and served as a seaman for several years before around 1840 being put in charge of a cargo boat shipping timber from the Baltic. In 1855 he was appointed captain of the Sebastian (426 tons) on the India route, calling in at Adelaide and Mauritius on the return voyage. His next appointment was as captain of the Orient Line clipper Coonatto trading between England and Adelaide from 1863 to 1866, when he was put in charge of The Murray, on which he served until 1872, making very good voyages, and impressing his passengers with his urbanity and sailor-like qualities, an asset to the reputation and no doubt profitability of the Orient Line.

He settled in Adelaide and was made manager of the Tug Company, then was appointed ship's surveyor for Lloyd's of London. In 1877 he and John Legoe had a part in formation of the Port Stevedoring Company, and he served with that company until a few weeks before his death.

== Recognition ==
Begg was awarded a silver medal by the Italian government for his part in rescuing sailors from a burning vessel. This was the Mannin Barabino, which caught fire while sailing from Genoa to Puerto Rico in May 1870. Begg and the crew of The Murray went to her aid and did what they could to rescue survivors, but 120 perished either in the inferno, the barque's cargo being largely spirits, or in the sea after her overloaded boat capsized.

== Family ==
Begg was married twice; by his first wife he had three children:

- Robert Caithness Begg (c. 1851 – 21 September 1922), master of the barque Pakwan 1875–1878 married Eliza Allsop, youngest daughter of Captain Allsop on 19 November 1873.
- Elizabeth Begg ( – ) married John Fletcher ( – ) on 23 December 1875. John was son of slipmaster Henry C. Fletcher.
- Helen Wylie Caithness "Nellie" Begg ( –1909) married George Wafford Dempster (1853–1918) on 3 December 1878

He married again, to (Sarah) Eleanor Allsop (1840 – 19 September 1927), daughter of Captain Allsop (a rare instance of father and son marrying sisters). They had seven children, including:

- William John Allsop Begg ( –1947) married Ada Haussen (1864–1952) on 3 March 1888. She was a step-daughter of F. E. Bucknall.
- Henry Allsop Begg (1867 – 12 Jan 1954) married Agnes Augusta Parr Hanson (1864–1951) on 16 October 1891
- Percy William Begg (1870 – 22 November 1958) born London
- Charles Murray Begg (1871 – 9 November 1947) born aboard The Murray prior to her arrival at Port Adelaide.
- Charlotte Downie Begg (1875 – 26 September 1903) married Charles John Young (c. 1878 – c. 30 December 1917) on 27 December 1900. He was founder of the firm of C. J. Young, shoe retailers.
- Frederick James Begg (1877–1941)
- Ida Katharine Begg (25 March 1880 – 1966) married her sister's widower Charles John Young (c. 1878 – c. 30 December 1917) on 10 October 1912

They had a home at The Semaphore, where he died after a short illness.
