= Thomas Bilbe =

English shipbuilder and shipowner (1803–1884)

Thomas Bilbe (1803 – 28 November 1884) was an English shipbuilder and shipowner based in Rotherhithe. He built tea clippers and was involved in the opium trade with China.

Thomas was born in Sheerness, Kent and married Eliza Ann Chappell 30 January 1826, St. John's, Horsleydown.
