= Composite ship =

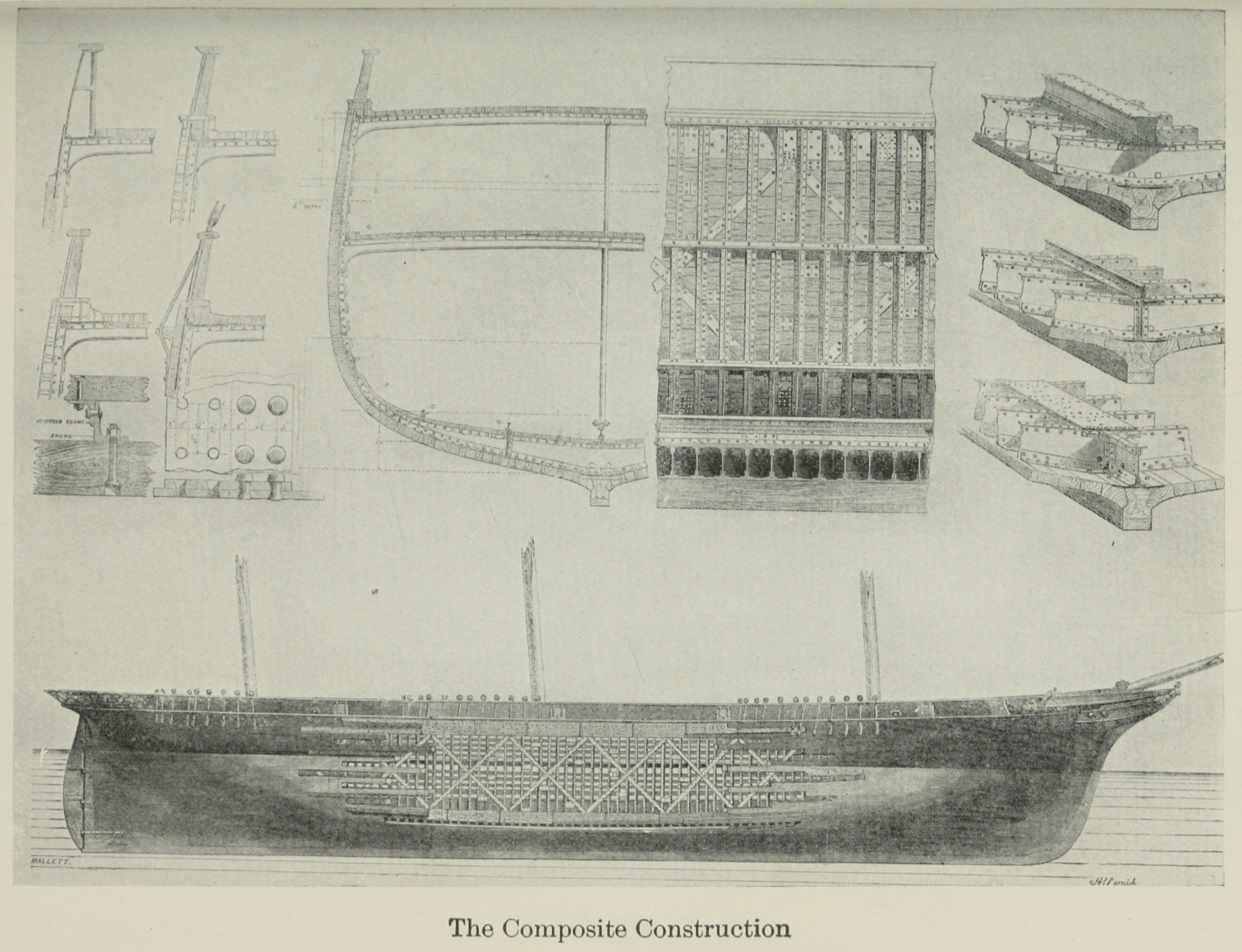
Contemporary plans of composite ship construction

The technique of composite ship construction (wooden planking over a wrought iron frame) emerged in the mid-19th century as the final stage in the evolution of fast commercial sailing ships.

Construction of wrought iron hulled vessels had begun in the 1820s and was a mature technology by the time of the launch of the SS Great Britain in 1843. However, iron hulls could not be sheathed with copper alloy (due to bimetallic corrosion) and so would become festooned with drag-inducing weed during long voyages in the tropics.

The wooden planking of a composite ship allowed the copper sheathing essential for fast ocean crossings under sail while the iron frame made the ship relatively immune from hogging and sagging, and took up less interior space than wooden framing.

The brief reign of composite clippers as the fastest mode of transport between Europe and Asia was brought to a close by the opening of the Suez Canal in 1869 and ongoing improvement in the performance of steam ships.

Composite construction was also used for some steamships. An idea of the proportion of composite ships built can be gained from the statistics for vessels constructed on the Clyde (and tributaries thereof) in 1869. Of the 206 ships launched there in the year, 22 were of composite construction, compared to 168 of iron and 16 of wood. Of the 22 composite vessels, 16 were sailing ships and 6 steamers.

Today only five ships of this type survive, in various states of preservation or decay.

- City of Adelaide (1864), Passenger Clipper, Transported to Port Adelaide, South Australia, in February 2014; currently on barge, awaiting selection of final shore-based location
- Cutty Sark (1869), Tea Clipper, Restored, Greenwich, England
- Ambassador (1869), Tea Clipper, Beached skeleton, Estancia San Gregorio, Chile
- HMS Gannet (1878), Naval Sloop, Restored, Chatham, England
- Darra beached wreck, Ōtamahua / Quail Island, Lyttelton Harbour / Whakaraupō, New Zealand
