= Rodney (clipper) =

Ship

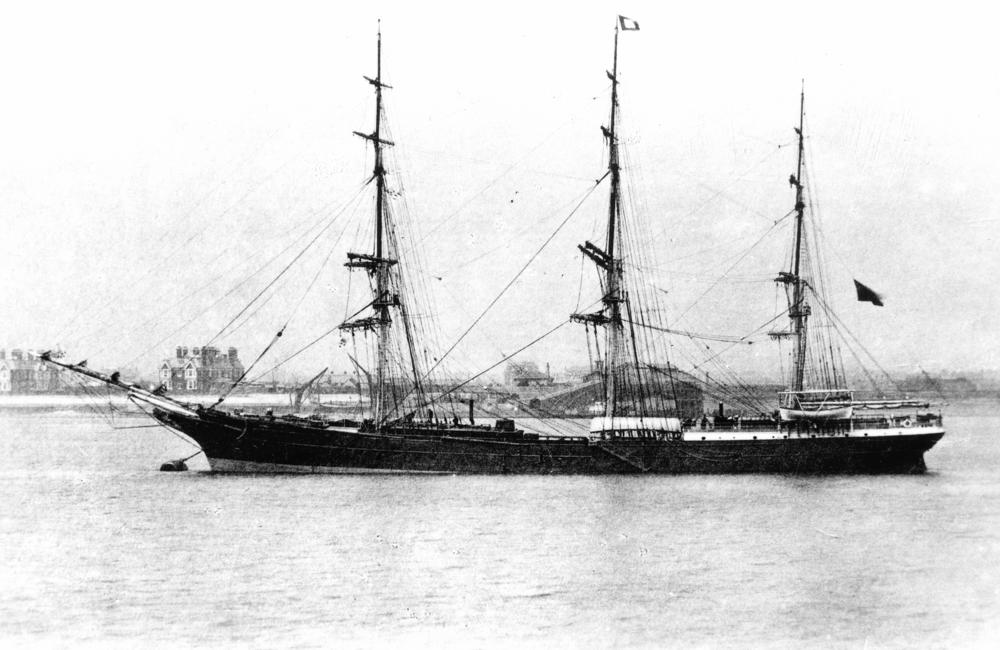
- Photograph of Rodney

History
- Name: 1874: Rodney; 1897: Gipsy
- Owner: 1874: Devitt and Moore; 1897: F Boissière
- Port of registry: 1861: (United Kingdom) London; 1897: (France) Nantes
- Builder: William Pile, Sunderland
- Yard number: 234
- Launched: 2 March 1874
- Completed: April 1874
- Identification: UK official number 68905; code letters NCSH
- Fate: wrecked 1901

General characteristics
- Type: iron-hulled clipper
- Tonnage: 1,519 GRT, 1,447 NRT
- Length: 235.6 ft (71.8 m)
- Beam: 38.4 ft (11.7 m)
- Depth: 22.6 ft (6.9 m)
- Decks: 2
- Sail plan: full rig

Rodney was an iron-hulled clipper ship that was built in Sunderland in 1874 and wrecked on the Cornish coast in 1901. She was one of the last ships built for the Australian migration trade. Devitt and Moore operated her between Britain and Australia for more than two decades. Rodney set numerous records for speed, and had luxuries that were unusual for her era.

In the 1890s French interests bought Rodney and renamed her Gipsy. She was working as a cargo ship when she was wrecked.

== Building ==
William Pile, Junior built Rodney in Sunderland, County Durham. She was launched on 2 March 1874 and completed that April. Her registered length was 235.6 ft (71.8 m), her beam was 38.4 ft (11.7 m) and her depth was 22.6 ft (6.9 m). Her tonnages were 1,519 GRT and 1,447 NRT.

Rodney had berths for passengers in first class. Her cabins were unique for their era as they had fitted lavatory basins, and chests with drawers. She also had bathrooms that provided hot and cold water. All of these things were considered a luxury at the time.

Pile built Rodney for Devitt and Moore, who registered her at London. Her United Kingdom official number was 68905 and her code letters were NCSH.

== Service ==
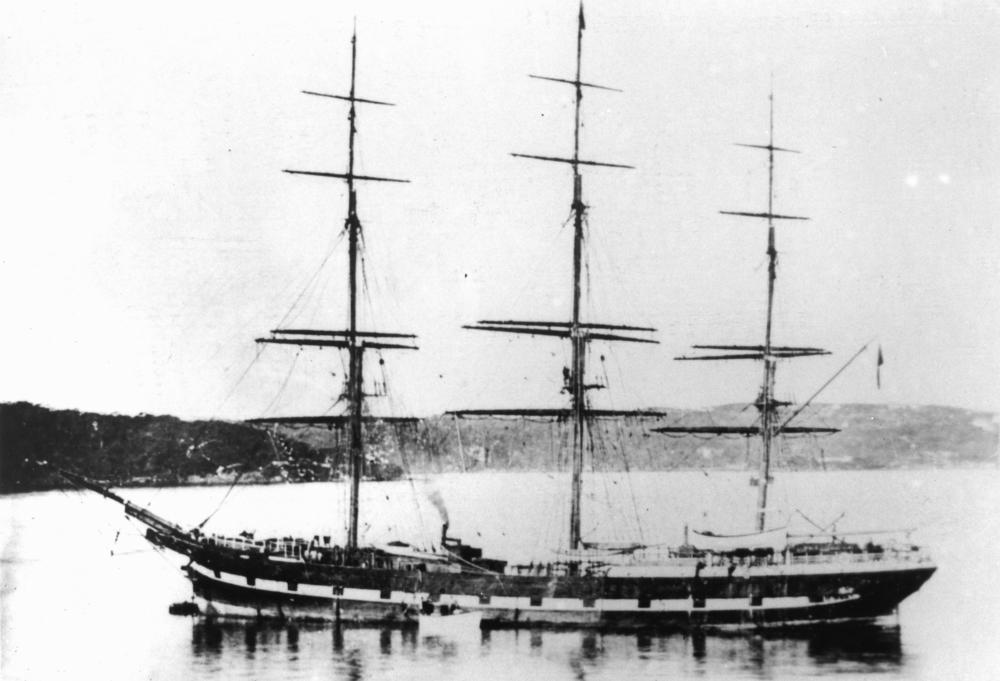
Rodney painted with false gun ports

Rodney was promoted for her speed. In 1880 she made her best trip to Adelaide, arriving in 74 days. Under Captain A Louttit in 1882, she made her best trip to Melbourne, which took only 69 days from the English Channel. Rodney beat her own record five years later from The Lizard to Sydney under Captain Barrett, arriving in 67 days. This equalled a record that Patriarch set in 1870.

Her best voyage home to the Lizard from Sydney was 77 days in 1889–90. On that voyage Rodney raced with the clipper Cutty Sark, the two shifted positions and passed each other numerous times. Cutty Shark won the race in 73 days, but Rodney was one of the few ships to have been competitive.

On 1 November 1895 Rodney lost her lion figurehead in a gale in the English Channel while en route from Gravesend, Kent to Sydney, New South Wales. The figurehead washed ashore at Whitsand Bay, Cornwall six months later.

In 1896 or 1897 (Note: Sources available for Rodney give conflicting years for when Boissière bought her.) F Boissière bought Rodney, renamed her Gypsy, and registered her in Nantes. On 7 December 1901 she was sailing from Iquique, Chile to France with a cargo of nitrate when she was wrecked at Downderry on the coast of Cornwall. Her insurers declared her a total loss.
