= Dunbar (surname) =

Dunbar is a surname. Notable people and fictional characters with the surname include:

== People ==
- Adrian Dunbar (born 1958), Northern Irish actor
- Aynsley Dunbar (born 1946), English musician
- Bobby Dunbar, a child who disappeared in 1912
- Bonnie J. Dunbar (born 1949), American astronaut
- Bonnie S. Dunbar (born 1948), vaccine developer
- Carl Owen Dunbar (1891–1979), American paleontologist
- Charles Davidson Dunbar (1870–1939), pipe major
- Charles Franklin Dunbar (1830–1900), American economist
- Chloe Dunbar (born 2009), Canadian para-athlete
- Council Julian Dunbar Jr. (1922–2020), American politician
- Cyrus Dunbar (1856–1920), Washington state pioneer and businessman
- David Dunbar (disambiguation)
- Donald Dunbar (born 1983), American poet
- Donald P. Dunbar (fl. 1983–2019), American National Guard major general and former Adjutant General forced to resign
- Dorothy Dunbar (1902–1992), American actress and socialite
- Emmons Dunbar (1882–1954), American agriculturalist and college football coach
- Erica Armstrong Dunbar, American historian
- Evelyn Dunbar (1906–1960), British artist
- Forrest Dunbar (born 1984), American politician and attorney
- Gavin Dunbar (disambiguation)
- Gavin Dunbar (archbishop of Glasgow)
- George Dunbar (disambiguation)
- George II, Earl of March (c. 1370–1457), also known as George de Dunbar, 11th Earl of March
- Helen Flanders Dunbar (1902–1959), psychiatrist and psychobiologist
- Jackie Dunbar, Scottish politician
- James Dunbar (disambiguation)
- Jennifer Dunbar Dorn
- Jesse Dunbar, American colonist
- Jim Dunbar (1929–2019), American radio personality
- John Dunbar (disambiguation)
- Jubilee Dunbar (born 1947), American football player
- Karen Dunbar (born 1971), Scottish comedian
- Lance Dunbar (born 1990), American football player
- Michael Dunbar (1863–1921), Scottish footballer
- Mike Dunbar (1948–2013), American football coach
- Moira Dunbar (1918–1999), Scottish-Canadian glaciologist
- Nan Dunbar (1928–2005), Fellow and Tutor in Classics at Somerville College, Oxford
- Paul Laurence Dunbar (1872–1906), American poet
- R. Scott Dunbar, American astronomer
- Roberta Dunbar (died 1956), American club woman and peace activist
- Robin Dunbar (born 1947), British anthropologist and evolutionary biologist
- Rockmond Dunbar (born 1973), American actor
- Ron Dunbar (1939–2018), American songwriter and record producer
- Roxanne Dunbar-Ortiz (born 1938), née Dunbar, American historian, writer, professor and activist
- Rudolph Dunbar (1907–1988), Guyanese conductor, clarinetist and composer
- Sly Dunbar (1952–2026), Jamaican drummer
- Steven Dunbar Jr. (born 1995), American football player
- Susan Ames Dunbar
- Tom Dunbar (1959–2011), American professional baseball player
- Vaughn Dunbar (born 1968), American college football player
- William Dunbar (disambiguation)

== Fictional characters ==
- Dunbar, in the novel Catch-22
- Daniel Dunbar, also known as Dan the Dyna-Mite, from The Young All-Stars
- First Lieutenant John J. Dunbar, the protagonist/narrator of Dances with Wolves
- Heather Dunbar, erstwhile Solicitor General and 2016 Democratic Primary challenger to President Frank Underwood
- Russell Dunbar, a character in Rules of Engagement (TV series)
- William Dunbar, a recurring character in Code Lyoko who becomes a main character in Code Lyoko: Evolution
- Zeke Jedediah Dunbar, the protagonist's sidekick in the 2009 video game Infamous

== See also ==
- Alice Dunbar-Nelson (1875–1935), American poet, journalist and political activist
- Vicki Nelson-Dunbar
