= Robert Dunbar (disambiguation) =

Robert Dunbar (1812–1890) was a Scottish mechanical engineer.

Robert Dunbar may also refer to:

- Robert C. Dunbar (1878–1973), American football player and coach
- Robert Clarence Dunbar (1908–1966), American child who vanished in 1912; see Disappearance of Bobby Dunbar
- Robert Nugent Dunbar (1798–1866), British poet

== See also ==
- Dunbar (surname)
