= William Dunbar (explorer) =

Scottish-born American explorer (1749–1810)

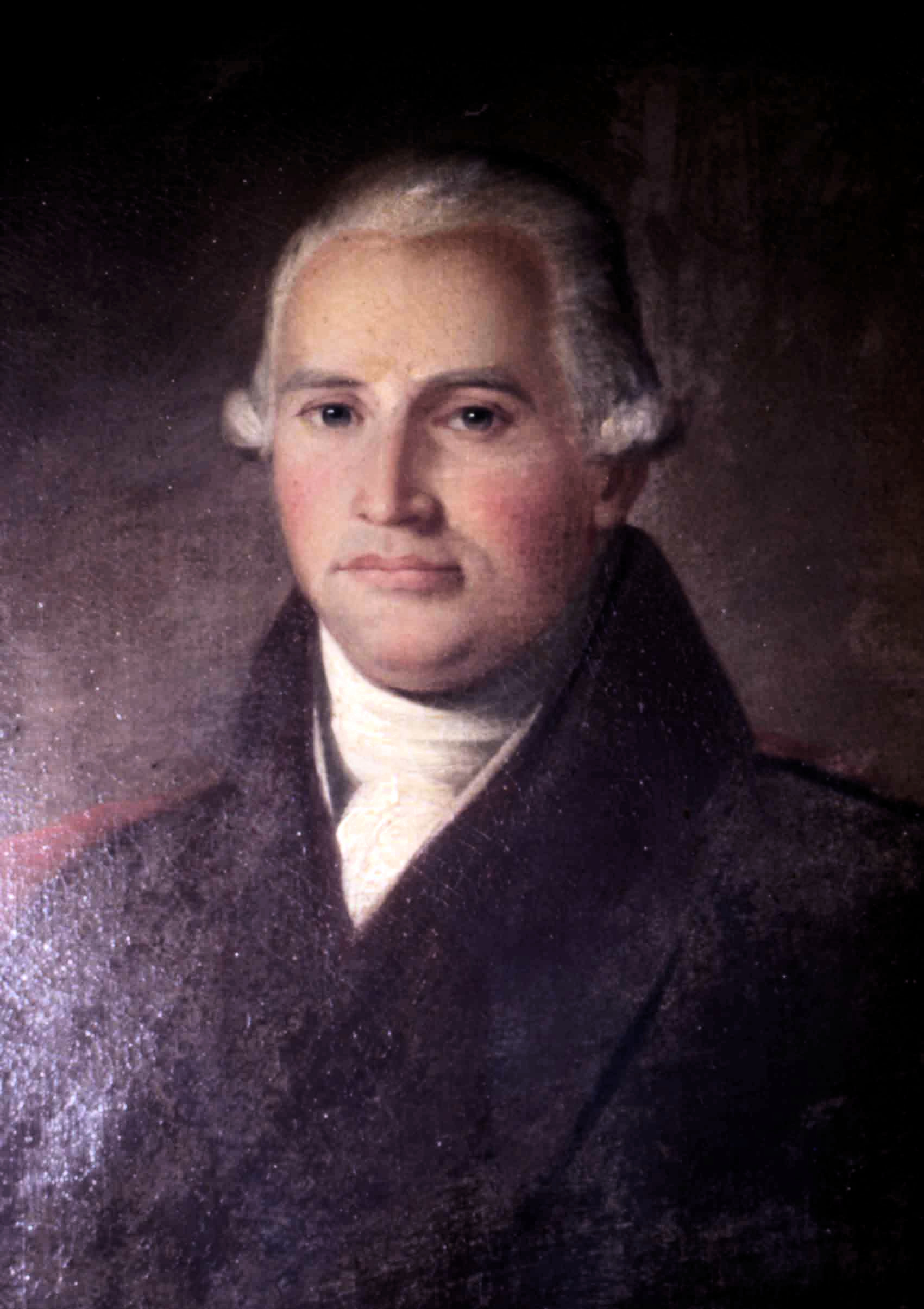
- Born: November 18, 1749; Duffus, Scotland
- Died: October 16, 1810 (aged 60); Augusta, Georgia, US
- Education: King's College, Aberdeen
- Occupations: Planter, explorer
- Children: Archibald, Robert, Alexander, Helen Dunbar Huntington
- Parent(s): Sir Archibald Dunbar, 4th baronet of Northfield and Duffus; Helen Dunbar

William Dunbar (November 18, 1749 – October 16, 1810) was a Scottish-born American merchant, plantation owner, naturalist, astronomer, and explorer.

== Early life and education ==
William Dunbar was born on November 18, 1749, in Duffus. His family's roots can be traced back to at least the tenth century. His father, Sir Archibald Dunbar, 4th baronet of Northfield and Duffus, married his cousin Helen Dunbar, with whom he had at least one girl and three boys: Archibald, Robert and Alexander. Helen died in 1748 and in 1750 Anne Bayne became Archibald's second wife. They had three children: William, Thomas and Peggy. William's father thought him a sissy and worried about his health, because he was quiet and serious-minded, unlike his half-brothers, who hunted, fished, and drank. Archibald did not recognise William's brilliance.

William entered King's College in Aberdeen in autumn 1763, and graduated with a Master of Arts degree on March 30, 1767. After his return to Elgin, William continued his study and research in the natural sciences. The deaths in 1762 of his two eldest half-brothers, Archibald and Robert, brought William from fourth to second in line to inherit the family estates, but William's father Archibald died in 1769, leaving him only about 500 pounds.

His remaining half-brother, Alexander, as the oldest surviving male, inherited the full rights to all of the estates – he became Sir Alexander Dunbar, 5th baronet of Northfield and Duffus. William probably could have expected assistance from his father in making his way in Britain, but not from a half-brother with whom he had never really been close.

== Career ==
In spring 1771, William Dunbar sailed from London to Philadelphia to try his luck in America. He initially became a merchant in Philadelphia, transporting goods he brought with him from London in an effort to enter the Indian trade. In 1773, he formed a partnership with John Ross, another Scottish merchant from Philadelphia, in the British province of West Florida. He then went to Pensacola and obtained a grant of land near Baton Rouge, which was at the time called Fort New Richmond, from the British governor. He was a Judge of Probate in 1780. In 1784, he established, together with Ross, a plantation near Natchez, Mississippi called "The Forest", where he cultivated Indigo and cotton. He also identified deposits of red ochre and yellow ochre on his land and mined them to ship for sale in England.

The mansion was reportedly constructed beginning in 1792, and was described in 1915 as "a magnificent home of great architectural beauty and fine proportions. This house became the precedent, for many homes built later on, with its wide halls and stately rooms, and the galleries extending entirely around the house on the upper and lower stories and supported by fine Corinthian columns. Monticello, the Shields' home was built on this plan...This home was burned in 1856 and unfortunately no sketch exists of this lordly Dunbar mansion with its winding carriage way, imposing entrance and delightful galleries." Dunbar was also the patriarch of a lineage in Natchez known as the "city Dunbars", distinguishing them from another unrelated Dunbar family in Natchez called the "country Dunbars".

After Ross' death in 1800, he bought out his interest from Ross' heirs. In 1785, he married Dinah Clark from Whitehaven, England, with whom he had nine children. By 1803 Dunbar owned some 4,000 acres (16 km^{2}) – he also owned "The Grange" and other lots within Natchez given him for his service to the Spanish Government as surveyor. In 1807 he wrote Charleston merchants, Thomas Tunno and John Price, to purchase a shipload of African slaves excepting those from 'the Iboa nation' and those 'nearer the coast, such as Bornon, Houssa, Zanfara, Zegzeg, Kapina, Tombotoo, all or near the river Niger'. Dunbar died in The Forest on October 16, 1810.

== Scientific achievements ==
William Dunbar was known for his engineering and scientific talents, which he employed in plantation work. He invented a screw press and introduced the square baling of cotton, and was the first to suggest the manufacture of cottonseed oil. He was Surveyor General for West Florida in 1798 and made the first meteorological observations in the Mississippi Valley in 1799. Dunbar built an astronomical observatory in Union Hill near his Natchez home and opened it to the public.

In 1799, Daniel Clark introduced Dunbar to Thomas Jefferson (then Vice President) through a letter, saying "for Science, Probity & general information [he] is the first Character in this part of the World". Through Jefferson, Dunbar would be introduced to the rest of the American scientific establishment. Dunbar met Jefferson for the first time in person two weeks before his death, but the two corresponded for many years, and Jefferson asked him to lead the Red River expedition in 1804 and to organize another one in 1806. He was elected to the American Philosophical Society in 1800 and contributed twelve articles to the Society Transactions on subjects in natural history, astronomy and American Sign Language. In 1803, Dunbar, with others, established the Mississippi Society for the Acquirement and Dissemination of Useful Knowledge. After returning from the expeditions, and until his death in 1810, he devoted himself to scientific inquiry, gathering a significant collection of data on Indian vocabulary, as well as using chemical analysis in geology, seasonal river levels, fossils, astronomical phenomena, and utilizing a method of finding longitude by astronomical means.

== Grand Expedition ==
On March 13, 1804, Thomas Jefferson (who was President at the time) wrote to Dunbar, charging him with the task of assembling the first scientific expedition into the southern territory of the Louisiana Purchase which was referred to as "The Great Expedition". Jefferson sanctioned four other such expeditions: the 1804 Lewis and Clark Corps of Discovery expedition to the northern territory of the Louisiana Purchase (post Dundar and Hunter), Willam Dunbar's Red River expedition of 1806, the Red River Expedition of Thomas Freeman and Peter Custis, and the Pike Expedition in 1806–07.

Jefferson assigned George Hunter, a prominent Philadelphia chemist and also a Scot, to be second in command to Dunbar. The proposed southern journey was later called the Grand Expedition. The trip was drastically altered due to friction with the Osage Indians and Spanish colonial officials, resulting in a shorter journey.

On October 16, 1804, Dunbar and Hunter set off with a party of 15 on the expedition, which lasted just under three months. They explored the Red River, Black river, and Ouachita River. The crew brought back a wealth of scientific information, geological surveys, and records of flora and fauna. One important note from the expedition was that they recorded the first detailed chemical analysis of the Hot Springs of Arkansas.

Another expedition preliminarily named the "Great Excursion" was planned by Jefferson in order to continue the exploration of the Red River. Although Dunbar's failing health prevented him from participating in the expedition, he nevertheless was charged by Jefferson with the task of organizing it, together with Secretary of War Henry Dearborn. Dunbar used his experience from the first Red River expedition to plan this one; among his ideas was to use a boat suited for inland river exploration in the trans-Mississippi region. This expedition was led by astronomer/surveyor Thomas Freeman and medical student Peter Custis, and it reached 615 miles (990 km) up the river before being halted by a Spanish military force.

The Hunter-Dunbar expedition was the first American government financed expedition into the recent Louisiana Purchase. This particular expedition is somewhat overlooked because Lewis and Clark made their expansive and dramatic expeditions shortly after the Hunter-Dunbar expedition and "The Grand Expedition" was overshadowed. While Lewis and Clark's travels into then unknown territory produced some of the most expansive and well documented maps, journal writings, drawings and scientific studies, it was Hunter and Dunbar who first officially explored parts of this dangerous, unknown and mysterious territory for the American government. Originally the team was to venture only into southern regions of the Louisiana Purchase. However, their route changed several times due to trouble with the local indian tribes which eventually detoured them into southern Arkansas. "It provided Americans with the first scientific study of the varied landscapes as well as the animal and plant life of early southern Arkansas. The expedition resulted in arguably the most purely scientific collection of data among all of the Louisiana Purchase explorations". The Hunter-Dunbar expedition was extremely important to the future for the United States because the information garnered was essential to the American expansion westward. The expedition was not as long as other expeditions, but was no less relevant. The Hunter-Dunbar Expedition set many things in place for future expansion based upon their findings during their sojourn into that uncharted territory.

The success of this expedition is based upon Hunter and Dunbar's extensive journal entries, their scientific observations and a few geological experiments that were conducted during the trip". Dunbar and Hunter were not the first to travel the Ouachita River or to taste the waters of the hot springs, nor were they the first to describe the region in journals or publications. They did succeed in the first scientific mapping and description of the Ouachita River valley".

"As Dunbar and Hunter ascended the Red, Black and Ouachita rivers, the journals of both men became replete with descriptions of soil types, water levels, flora, fauna, and daily astronomical and thermometer readings."
