= Duncan Dunbar =

Duncan Dunbar may refer to:

- Duncan Dunbar (brewer) (1764–1825), Scottish brewer and wine merchant, father of the shipowner
- Duncan Dunbar (shipowner) (1803–1862), Scottish businessman, son of the brewer
- Duncan Dunbar (ship), a clipper

== See also ==
- Duncan (disambiguation)
- Dunbar (disambiguation)
- Dunbar (ship), several ships
