= Dunbar (disambiguation) =

Dunbar is a town in East Lothian, Scotland.

Dunbar may also refer to:

== Places ==
=== Australia ===
- Dunbar Station (Queensland), a pastoral lease, now a cattle station

=== United Kingdom ===
- Dunbar (Parliament of Scotland constituency), a pre-1707 constituency
- Dunbar Castle, Dunbar, Scotland
- Dunbar sands or Doom Bar, Cornwall, England, a sand bar

=== United States ===
- Dunbar, Georgia, an unincorporated community
- Dunbar, Iowa, an unincorporated community and former railroad depot village
- Dunbar, Kentucky, an unincorporated community
- Dunbar, Nebraska, a village
- Dunbar, Ohio, an unincorporated community
- Dunbar, Oklahoma, an unincorporated community
- Dunbar, Pennsylvania, a borough
- Dunbar, Georgetown County, South Carolina, an unincorporated community and census-designated place
- Dunbar, Marlboro County, South Carolina, an unincorporated community
- Dunbar, Virginia, an unincorporated community and census-designated place
- Dunbar, West Virginia, a city
- Dunbar, Wisconsin, a town
  - Dunbar (CDP), Wisconsin, a census-designated place within the city
- Williamsburg, Michigan, an unincorporated community formerly called Dunbar
- Dunbar Township, Fayette County, Pennsylvania

== People and fictional characters ==
- Dunbar (surname)
- Clan Dunbar, a Scottish Lowlands clan

== Titles ==
- Earl of Dunbar, a dormant title in the Peerage of Scotland
- Viscount of Dunbar, an extinct title in the Peerage of Scotland
- Dunbar baronets, five titles, four of them extant

== Other uses ==
- Dunbar (novel), a novel by Edward St Aubyn
- Dunbar (ship), several ships
- Dunbar railway station, serving Dunbar, Scotland
- Dunbar Hotel and Club, Los Angeles
- Dunbar Theatre (disambiguation)
- Dunbar, a locomotive character from Chuggington, a British animated TV series

== See also ==
- Dunbar's number, a value important in sociology and anthropology
- East Dunbar, Fort Myers, Florida, a neighborhood
- Dunbar–Southlands, a residential neighborhood in Vancouver, Canada
- Allied Dunbar, a defunct British life insurance firm
