= John Dunbar =

John Dunbar may refer to:

- John Dunbar (artist) (born 1943), British artist, collector
- John Dunbar, Earl of Moray (died 1390), Scottish nobleman
- Lt. John Dunbar, a fictional character in the film Dances with Wolves
- John Dunbar (MP) (died 1878), British Member of Parliament for New Ross, 1874–1878
- John Dunbar (triathlete), U.S. Navy SEAL and ironman triathlete
- John Dunbar (actor) (1914–2001), British actor in the film Love Among the Ruins
- Sir John Greig Dunbar (1907–?), Lord Provost of Edinburgh, 1960–1963
- John Dunbar (missionary) (1804–1857), missionary who tried to Christianize the Pawnee Indians of Nebraska
- Vet Dunbar (Johnny Dunbar), American baseball player
