= Dunbar, South Carolina =

Dunbar, South Carolina, may refer to two unincorporated communities:

- Dunbar, Georgetown County, South Carolina, also a census-designated place
- Dunbar, Marlboro County, South Carolina
