= Dunbar baronets of Hempriggs (1706) =

Escutcheon of the Dunbar baronets of Hempriggs

The Dunbar baronetcy of Hempriggs, Caithness, was created for Hon. James Dunbar, formerly James Sutherland, on 10 or 21 December 1706. He was a younger son of James Sutherland, 2nd Lord Duffus, and brother of the attainted Jacobite Kenneth Sutherland. He married Elizabeth Dunbar, daughter and heiress of Sir William Dunbar, 1st Baronet of the Dunbar baronets of Northfield (1700).

The remainder of the Dunbar baronets of Hempriggs is to heirs whomsoever, rather than only heirs male.

== Dunbar baronets of Hempriggs (1706) ==
- Sir James Dunbar, 1st Baronet (died 1724). He was Shire Commissioner for Caithness in the Parliament of Scotland 1706–1707 and represented Caithness in the British House of Commons 1710–1713, after an unopposed election for which he cultivated John Erskine, Earl of Mar. He had issue, the male line in remainder to the Lords Duffus until succeeding in 1827 and falling extinct in 1875.
- Sir William Dunbar, 2nd Baronet (died 1793). He married three times. By his third wife Henrietta Rose, daughter of Hugh Rose, 16th of Kilvarock, he had a son and heir:
- Sir Benjamin Dunbar, 3rd Baronet (1761–1843). He married Janet Mackay, and was succeeded by his son.
- Sir George Sutherland Dunbar, 4th Baronet (1799–1875). The title then passed to a nephew.
- Sir Benjamin Duff Dunbar, 5th Baronet (1808–1897)
- Sir George Duff-Sutherland-Dunbar, 6th Baronet (1878–1962)
- Sir George Cospatrick Duff-Sutherland-Dunbar, 7th Baronet (1906–1963)
- Dame Maureen Daisy Helen Dunbar, 8th Baronetess (1906–1997)
- Sir Richard Francis Dunbar, 9th Baronet (born 1945)
