= James Dunbar =

James Dunbar may refer to:

- James Dunbar (writer) (1742–1798), philosophical writer
- James W. Dunbar (1860–1943), US representative
- Jim Dunbar (1929–2019), radio programme director
- James Dunbar (rower) (1930–2018), American rower and Olympic gold medallist
- Sir James Dunbar, 1st Baronet (died 1718), of the Dunbar baronets, MP for Caithness
- Sir James Dunbar, 3rd Baronet (died 1782), of the Dunbar baronets
- Sir James George Hawker Roland Dunbar, 10th Baronet, (1862–1953) of the Dunbar baronets
- Sir James Michael Dunbar, 14th Baronet (born 1950), of the Dunbar baronets

== See also ==
- James Dunbar-Nasmith, English conservation architect
- Dunbar (disambiguation)
