= Maureen Dunbar =

Canadian baronetess (1906–1997)

Dame Maureen "Daisy" Helen Dunbar, 8th Baronetess, or more commonly known as Dame Maureen Dunbar (née Moore; 19 August 1906 – 14 February 1997), was the only daughter of Courtenay Edward Moore (1870–1951) and Janie King Moore (née Askins) (1873–1951). The baronetcy passed to her through her predeceased father's line in 1963, making her one of only four baronetesses in British history. Her brother, Edward Courtnay Francis "Paddy" Moore (1898–1918), had been killed in action in 1918.

== Early life ==
Born Maureen Daisy Helen Moore in Ireland, she lived with her mother Janie King Moore (née Askins) and C. S. Lewis for 22 years, until 1940, when she married Leonard James Blake (died 1989). Janie Moore was the mother of Lewis's university friend Paddy Moore, who had been killed in the First World War. When Lewis and Paddy served in the army they promised to care for each other's family if one of them died. She and her mother had started living with Lewis in late 1918 or early 1919, when she was a 13-year-old schoolgirl at Headington School and Lewis was a 19 or 20-year-old university student. Lewis’s brother, Warren Lewis, joined the household in 1930. Janie Moore was married, though separated from her husband Courtenay, and remained in that state until her death in 1951, the same year her husband died. Janie Moore stayed with Lewis until her death.

Towards the end of her mother's life, Maureen would sometimes trade houses with Lewis, helping him take care of her mother. Dame Maureen had a son, Richard Francis Dunbar of Hempriggs (born Richard Francis Blake on 8 January 1945), so the baronetcy returned on her death in 1997 to the male line.

== Succession to baronetcy ==
She succeeded to the Scottish baronetcy in the most roundabout of ways possible. Garden Duff-Dunbar of Hempriggs had predeceased his father, leaving two young sons, George, afterwards Sir George Duff-Sutherland-Dunbar, 6th Baronet, and Lt. Cdr. Kenneth Duff-Dunbar, who died in World War I and whose only son, Capt. Kenneth Duff-Dunbar, died in World War II. The widow of Garden Duff-Dunbar, Louise Duff-Dunbar, died just after World War II. Her eldest son, Sir George, succeeded as 6th Baronet on his grandfather’s death in 1897, but took no part in the administration of the estates, spending most of his life in India as an administrator, where he became well known as one of the country’s greatest historians.

On his death, his only son, George, who had been a barrister in London for some years, succeeded as 7th Baronet. He died comparatively young and unmarried, in 1963. His first cousin and heir Capt. Kenneth Duff-Dunbar had fallen in World War II and in terms of the remainder, his second cousin, Maureen, great granddaughter of Capt. Benjamin Duff, by the only one of his daughters to leave issue, succeeded to the honours and estates and became 8th Baronetess of Hempriggs.

Dame Maureen Dunbar was recognized in the name of Dunbar of Hempriggs by Lyon Court in 1965. The male heirs of the first baronet having died out, this Nova Scotia Baronetcy was conferred with remainder to heirs whatever, i.e., it can be and has been inherited through or by a female representative of the family. The arms of Hempriggs reflect the families through whom the title has passed. First, quarterly is Dunbar, 2nd is Sutherland, 3rd is Duff, and 4th is Randolph.

When Dame Maureen succeeded to the title, the baronetcy had an estate attached, Ackergill Tower, by Wick, Caithness, Scotland. In the far north east of Scotland, the much-altered tower stands close by the sea shore, about one mile west of the Sinclair stronghold of Girnigoe castle. The earliest part of Ackergill dates back to the 15th century, when an oblong tower house was raised by the Keith family. Dame Maureen lived there and was happy to open the house for inspection to anyone who showed a genuine interest in its history. Today, the Tower is a hotel and conference centre.

The house that she, her mother, Lewis and his brother Warren moved to in 1930, The Kilns, a house in Risinghurst, Headington (a suburb of Oxford), was purchased with funds (£3,300) provided by the Lewis brothers and Dame Maureen's mother, Janie Moore. Janie's name was solely on the deeds of the property and the title allowed Jack and Warren a so-called 'Right of Life' tenancy, which meant they could continue living there after her death (1951). Free and clear title to the house and estates passed to Dame Maureen when Warren Lewis died in 1973.

Baronetage of Nova Scotia
Preceded by George Duff-Sutherland-Dunbar	Baronet (of Hempriggs); 1963–1997	Succeeded by Richard Francis Dunbar
