= Ackergill Lifeboat Station =

Former RNLI lifeboat station in Highland, Scotland

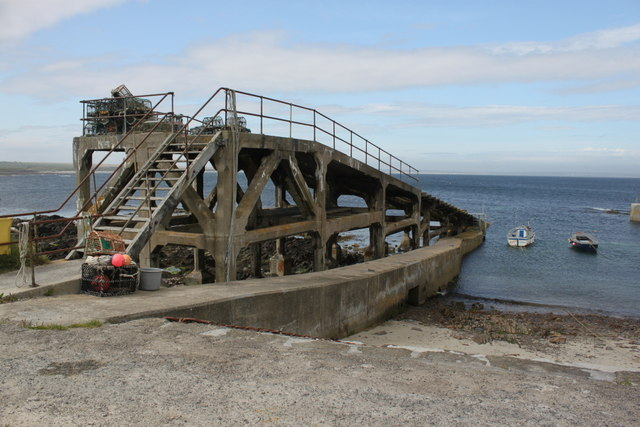
- Ackergill Lifeboat Slipway (1909)

- Ackergill Harbour, Caithness, Scotland

General information
- Status: Closed
- Type: RNLI Lifeboat Station
- Location: The Lifeboat House, Ackergill Harbour, Ackergill, Highland, Scotland
- Coordinates: 58°28′25.9″N 3°06′05.0″W
- Opened: 1878
- Closed: 1932

Ackergill Lifeboat Station is located at Ackergill Harbour, near the town of Wick, in the administrative region of Highland, historically Caithness, in the North-east corner of Scotland.

A lifeboat station was established at Ackergill by the Royal National Lifeboat Institution (RNLI) station in 1878.

After operating for 54 years, Ackergill Lifeboat Station closed in 1932.

== History ==
On 21 November 1860, the sloop Maria was taking shelter in Sinclairs Bay, when the weather worsened. Capt. John Tudor, Coxswain of the private Wick Harbour lifeboat, made arrangements to transport the Wick lifeboat overland to Ackergill. After going on ahead, on arrival at Ackergill, he realised that something must be done immediately. A local boat belonging to Caithness Steam Shipping Co. was launched with Tudor and a crew of nine. The two crew of the Maria were rescued, and landed at Ackergill, just as the Wick lifeboat arrived. Capt. John Tudor, RN, was awarded the RNLI Silver Medal, and the Board of Trade Silver Medal for Gallantry. The nine other crew members were each awarded the Board of Trade Bronze Medal for Gallantry

Sixteen years later, on 23 December 1876, the 120-ton vessel Emilie was driven ashore in Sinclairs Bay, near Ackergill Tower. Nine men, led by Capt. John Cormack, launched a small salmon coble to their aid, but it capsized on the first return journey with three crew of the Emilie. Only five men survived from the coble, and only one of the six crew of the Emilie was saved. Capt. Cormack was posthumously awarded the Board of Trade Bronze Medal for Gallantry.

Following a public enquiry, an approach was made to the RNLI, and at a meeting of the committee of management on 5 June 1877, it was agreed to establish a lifeboat station in Ackergill. The land and building materials were made available by Mr G. Duff Dunbar of Hempriggs, and the boathouse, designed by local architect Mr. Brims, was constructed near Ackergill Tower by local builder Mr Charleson, at a cost of £320.

With few crew available locally, a smaller 8-oared 30-foot self-righting 'Pulling and Sailing' (P&S) lifeboat, one with oars and sail, and costing £275, was constructed by Woolfe of Shadwell, with the launch carriage costing a further £136-3s-0d. The cost was met with £400 raised locally, plus a further £800 gift from Mrs A. Bower, of Lessness Heath. The new lifeboat was transported by rail from London to Wick.

On 14 March 1878, the boat was taken in grand procession through the streets of Wick, led by the Artillery brass band, and followed by Freemasons in their masonic robes, members of various trades, fishermen, and various bagpipers. Taken onto Reiss sands, Mrs Duff Dunbar named the lifeboat George and Isabella, as per the request of the donor, and then the lifeboat was launched on demonstration to the assembled crowd. George Sutherland and Mr Duff Dunbar were respectively appointed Honorary Secretary and president, of the Wick and Ackergill branch of the RNLI, with William Thain appointed Coxswain.

In 1886, the lifeboat house was moved from Ackergill Tower, and rebuilt on a site overlooking Ackergill harbour, at a cost of £213-0s-6d. The following year, on 11 January 1887, after 9 years on service, the George and Isabella would be launched on her only, but significant, service call. When a severe gale blew up, the lifeboat went to the aid of four herring fishing boats, anchored in Sinclairs Bay. In two trips, 30 men were rescued. In the same year, a new lifeboat was provided to Ackergill. A 34-foot 10-oared self-righting (P&S) lifeboat, again built by Woolfe of Shadwell, London, was one of three boats provided from the legacy of Col. E.A.D. Brooshoft, of Kirk Ella, near Hull. The boat was named Jonathan Marshall, Sheffield (ON 170). Serving for nearly 20 years, the boat would launch eight times, and rescue 11 people.

The Wick and Pulteneytown Harbour lifeboat was finally retired in 1895. and the RNLI established a new station at Wick, providing a new lifeboat. Hector Sutherland, Town Clerk at Wick, and now Honorary Secretary of Ackergill lifeboat, was also appointed Honorary Secretary for Wick Lifeboat Station, both stations being run by the same branch committee.

In 1907, Ackergill would receive their third and final lifeboat, a 37-foot 10-oared self-righting (P&S) lifeboat, constructed by Thames Ironworks, and costing £1,048. She was named Co-operator No.3 (ON 582), funded by the Co-operative Union. Launching a lifeboat at Ackergill had always proved difficult, and now a larger heavier lifeboat had been placed on service. In 1909, the RNLI decided to build the first Ferro-concrete slipway, dramatically speeding up launch times, the boat now being kept under a tarpaulin cover, sitting on top of the slipway.

However, the lifeboat was rarely required, launching just three times over a 25-year period, with no record of any lives saved. Motor-powered lifeboats placed at Wick (1921) and Thurso (1929) rendered a 'pulling and sailing' lifeboat obsolete, and the days of the Ackergill lifeboat were numbered. At a meeting of the RNLI committee of management on Thursday 14 April 1932, it was decided to close Ackergill Lifeboat Station.

In 54 years service, three Ackergill lifeboats rescued 38 people. It is often the case that one family name is synonymous with a specific lifeboat station. In the case of Ackergill, the name was Thain. For 52 of those years, Ackergill coxswains came from the Thain family: William Thain (1876–1894); David Thain (1894–1913) and James Thain (1913–1930).

The 1886 boathouse and 1909 slipway still exist. The lifeboat on station at the time of closure, on service at Ackergill for 25 years, Co-operator No.3 (ON 582), was sold from service. No further details of the boat are known.

== Station honours ==
The following are awards made at Ackergill.

- RNLI Silver Medal

Capt. John Tudor, RN, Agent for British Fisheries Society, Coxswain (Wick Harbour Lifeboat) – 1860 (Second-Service clasp)

- Board of Trade Silver Medal for Gallantry

Capt. John Tudor, RN – 1860

- Board of Trade Bronze Medal for Gallantry

Nine crewmen – 1860

Capt. John Cormack – 1876 (post.)

== Roll of honour ==
In memory of those lost whilst serving at Ackergill.

- Lost whilst attempting to save the crew of the Emilie, 23 December 1876

Capt. John Cormack
R. Bain
W. Gunn
J. Sutherland

== Ackergill lifeboats ==
=== Pulling and Sailing (P&S) lifeboats ===
ON (Note: ON is the RNLI's Official Number of the boat.)	Name	Built	On station	Class	Comments
Pre-637	George and Isabella	1878	1877−1888	30-foot Montrose Self-righting (P&S)	(Note: 30-foot x 8-foot (8-oared) Montrose-class self-righting (P&S) lifeboat, gift of Miss A. Bower of Wilmslow, Cheshire, built by Woolfe of Shadwell, London, costing £275.)
170	Jonathan Marshall, Sheffield	1887	1888−1907	34-foot Self-righting (P&S)	(Note: 34-foot x 7-foot 6in (10-oared) self-righting (P&S) lifeboat, lagacy of Col. E. A. D. Brooshoft of Kirk Ella, Yorkshire, built by Woolfe of Shadwell, London,, costing £329.)
582	Co-operator No.3	1907	1907−1932	37-foot 6in Self-righting (P&S)	(Note: 37-foot 6in x 9-foot 3in (10-oared) self-righting (P&S) lifeboat, gift of Manchester Central Co-operative Society, built by Thames Ironworks, of Blackwall, London, costing £879)

Pre ON numbers are unofficial numbers used by the Lifeboat Enthusiast Society to reference early lifeboats not included on the official RNLI list.

== See also ==
- List of RNLI stations
- List of former RNLI stations
- Royal National Lifeboat Institution lifeboats
