= Ackergill =

Coordinates: 58.46113°N 3.11237°W

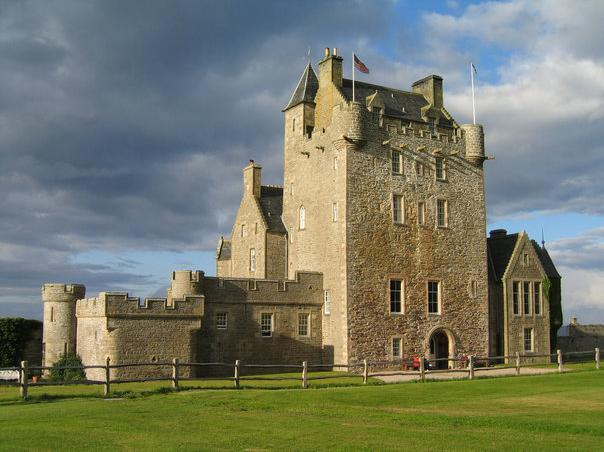
- Ackergill Tower

- Location within the Caithness area
- OS grid reference: ND351530
- Council area: Highland
- Country: Scotland
- Sovereign state: United Kingdom
- Postcode district: KW1 4
- Police: Scotland
- Fire: Scottish
- Ambulance: Scottish
- UK Parliament: Caithness, Sutherland and Easter Ross
- Scottish Parliament: Caithness, Sutherland and Ross

Ackergill is a settlement in the Wick, Caithness, in the Highland Council area of Scotland.

== History ==
In Ackergill is a famous tower/castle named Ackergill Tower. In the 1920s, archaeologists excavated an ancient cemetery in an elongated sand mound at Ackergill, finding ten graves with sixteen burials. Most inhumations were in long cists. Grave goods were found in only one of the burials. A Pictish symbol stone depicting the lower part of a fish together with a rectangular symbol bore the Ogham inscription “NEHTERI,” meaning “Neht, son of Etrios.” It is believed the burial ground may have been important through the first and second centuries.

The Royal National Lifeboat Institution's Ackergill Lifeboat Station operated from 1877until 1932.

== Economy ==
Despite being a small village, Ackergill used to have a lifeboat station, which served the increasing volume of shipping that began to pass through the area with the rise of the herring industry at nearby Wick from the mid-19th century; in poor weather, vessels often sought shelter in Sinclair's Bay. The lifeboat station is no longer used.
