= William Dunbar (disambiguation) =

William Dunbar was a Scottish poet.

William Dunbar may also refer to:

== People ==
- Sir William Dunbar, 7th Baronet (1812–1889), Scottish Liberal Member of Parliament in the British House of Commons
- William Dunbar (bishop) (1661–1746), Scottish Episcopal clergyman
- William Dunbar (explorer) (1750–1810), Scottish and American naturalist, astronomer, explorer
- William Dunbar (politician) (1805–1861), U.S. Representative from Louisiana
- William Dunbar (songwriter) (1852/53–1874), prolific Gateshead songwriter
- William C. Dunbar (1822–1905), Scottish Mormon missionary and Mormon pioneer
- William F. Dunbar (1820–?), American politician and first Minnesota State Auditor
- William P. Dunbar (1863–1922), American physician who made seminal discoveries about cholera control

== Fictional characters ==
- William Dunbar (Code Lyoko), in the animated television series Code Lyoko

== See also ==
- William Dunbar House, Boise, Idaho, United States, on the National Register of Historic Places
