= Duncan Weatherstone =

Scottish politician

Sir Duncan Mackay Weatherstone MC TD (1898–1972) was a Scottish politician who served as Lord Provost of Edinburgh from 1962 to 1966.

== Life ==
He was born in Edinburgh in 1898 the son of Robert Weatherstone of 12 East Northon Place. He trained as an insurance agent, his father's profession.

In the First World War he served in the Cameron Highlanders then won a commission and served as a Captain in the Royal Scots winning the Military Cross for his bravery during operations at Zillebeke.

In the 1960s he became Chairman of the Board of Governors of Heriot Watt College.

In 1963, he succeeded Sir John Greig Dunbar as Lord Provost of Edinburgh. During his term as Lord Provost he gained infamy by asking The Beatles for a £100,000 contribution towards the Edinburgh Festival which they declined suggesting that he should instead pawn his chain of office. This act led to a 3000-signature petition objecting to his "begging" for money. He also campaigned for the demolition of Waverley station and St Andrews Square Bus Station, preferring the use of the motor car.

His massive plans to reorganise traffic with an "inner ring road" also included demolition of many Georgian streets. He also organised the demolition of a group of buildings on Castle Terrace (north of the Usher Hall) to provide a new opera house. This project was only abandoned in 1975 and the gap was only filled in 1995.

During his period in office he was knighted by Queen Elizabeth II (as was standard for the Lord Provost at that time) in the 1965 Birthday Honours. In 1966, he was succeeded as Lord Provost by Sir Herbert Archbold Brechin.

He was appointed a Deputy Lieutenant of Edinburgh, on the recommendation of his successor as Lord Provost, in 1967. His later life was further plagued by scandal, both in marrying a very young bride and in getting into increasing financial difficulties, concluding in his being taken to court for debt in 1972. In his later life he lived at Buckingham Terrace in west Edinburgh.

== Artistic recognition ==
His portrait by Alan Sutherland is held by City of Edinburgh Council.

== Family ==
He and wife Janet married at Inverleith Church in Edinburgh. Their son, Bruce Weatherstone (1926-2009), became Chairman of Lothian Health Board.

Following Janet's death in 1966 he married a second time in 1968 to Elizabeth Evans. He was aged 70 and she was 29.
