= Red River Expedition (1806) =

United States expedition to explore the American West

The Red River Expedition, also known as the Freeman–Custis Expedition, Freeman Red River Expedition, Sparks Expedition, and officially Exploring Expedition of Red River, was one of the first civilian scientific expeditions to explore the Southwestern United States. The 1806 expedition was ordered to find the headwaters of the Red River (Red River of the South) from the Mississippi River as a possible trading route to Santa Fe, which was then under Spanish colonial control in New Mexico; to contact Native American peoples for trading purposes; to collect data on flora, fauna, and topography, and map the country and river; and to assess the land for settlement. The Spanish officials intercepted the expedition 615 miles upriver, in what is now northeastern Texas, and turned it back before the party had achieved all of its goals.

== Planning ==
The third US president, Thomas Jefferson, ranked the Red River Expedition in importance second only to the Lewis and Clark Expedition to reach the Pacific Ocean through the Northwest. The Red River stretches west from its confluence with the Mississippi River across what is now the state of Louisiana and part of south-western Arkansas. Further west, the river forms the present-day southern border of Oklahoma, where it meets Texas, and is now known to originate in the Texas Panhandle.

After acquiring the lands of the Louisiana Purchase in 1803, Jefferson commissioned military groups to explore the unfamiliar territory and to collect scientific data about flora and fauna, topography, and ethnography of the many Native American peoples. By sending a group of explorers up the Red River, Jefferson wanted to verify reports that the river could provide a water route to Santa Fe in New Mexico (then part of New Spain). Other goals were to build trade and political relationships with the various tribes of American Indians, and to locate the Louisiana Purchase's southwestern and western borders with New Spain.

In 1805 and early 1806, the President began to appoint leaders for the expedition. For the scientists, he chose the astronomer/surveyor Thomas Freeman, who had recently been with Andrew Ellicott on his survey of the southern boundary of the United States, and Peter Custis, who was the first academically trained naturalist to accompany an expedition, was still a medical student in Philadelphia, and served as the group's botanist and ethnographer. Captain Richard Sparks was chosen to lead the military troops. As the departure date of the expedition grew closer, more soldiers were recruited until the group numbered twenty-four in all.

President Jefferson persuaded Congress to fund the effort. He worked with foreign diplomats in Washington to convince them that the exploration was for scientific purposes and would not threaten their interests. Both the United Kingdom and France accepted the proposal, but Spain objected, as it also still claimed the lands to be explored, which it had just been forced to turn the Louisiana territories over briefly to Napoleon Bonaparte, who had suddenly unexpectedly turned and sold the vast interior continental lands to the Americans the year before. Spain did not want an armed military expedition within or near its remaining territory.

== Expedition ==
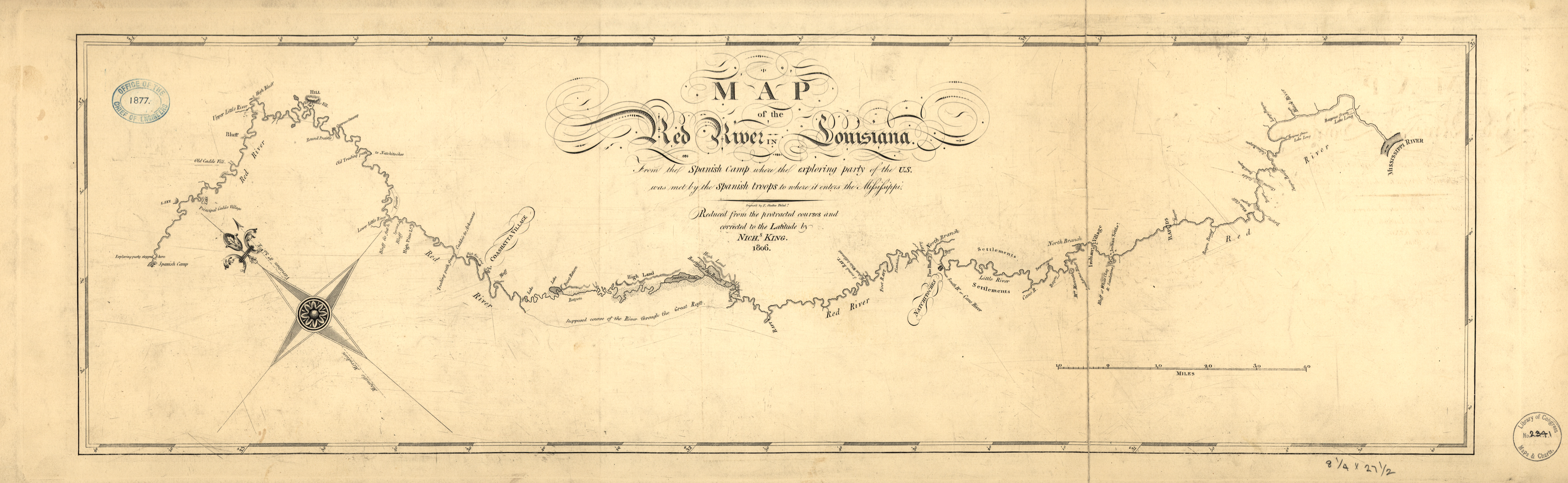
Map of the 1806 Red River Expedition's route. Published by Nich. King, 1806.

On April 19, 1806, the now-24-member party (Freeman and his two assistants; Sparks, who commanded the military party, with two officers, seventeen privates, and a servant) pushed off in two flat-bottomed barges and a pirogue from Fort Adams, near Natchez, Mississippi, and turned into the Red River to go upstream to the west. The group gradually took on soldiers along the route in response to rumors of a possible attack by Spanish troops and soon numbered 45. By July 28, the party was 615 miles upriver, near what is now New Boston, Texas, and heard gunfire in the distance that indicated the presence of Spanish troops.

"Hoping to provoke an international confrontation for personal gain," U.S. General James Wilkinson of the Louisiana Territory had secretly notified Spain of the Freeman expedition (he had had separate dealings with it earlier) and sent two teams of soldiers to intercept the party. The Freeman party was stopped at what has since been called "Spanish Bluff" on the river. Both the Spanish commander and Freeman undertook a parlay. The Spanish said that they had been ordered to fire on any foreign armed troops passing through Spanish territory. In response, Freeman demanded for the Spanish to provide their objections to the team's passage in writing and to name the authority under which they were taking action. The Spanish commander asked when Freeman would start on his return journey. Freeman's crew was highly outnumbered, and Jefferson had ordered the expedition to avoid any conflict with the Spanish. The expedition turned back on the next day and returned downriver to its starting point.

The abrupt end of the expedition, and the political embarrassment that it caused the Jefferson administration overshadowed the findings. Over time, the expedition proved to be a success in some aspects. Coupled with Dunbar and Hunter Expedition in lowland Louisiana, the Red River party demonstrated that exploration of the area was possible. In addition, the scientists reported that the land could support a large population. The border debacle, as it was perceived at the time, received much attention.

However, official comments were not taken concerning those events, and a single printed pamphlet was initially the only material that was published about the journey. Custis's pioneering work in naturalism was not superseded until much later expeditions, but his discoveries became obscured by the more dramatic quantity of material collected by the Lewis and Clark Expedition.

Jefferson commissioned the Pike Expedition through Wilkinson, which was also to seek the headwaters of the Red River and to explore the west of the Louisiana Territory, along the Arkansas River. Departing from St. Louis in July 1806, the expedition recorded the discovery in November of what became called Pikes Peak, in present-day Colorado. Many in the party, led by Captain Zebulon Pike Jr., were captured in February 1807 by the Spanish after they had made mistakes in navigation and been forced to winter in New Mexico. Spain protested officially to the U.S. about the military expedition within its territory, but as the nations were not at war, its troops escorted Pike and most of his men to the Louisiana border and released them later that year.

== Results ==
In present-day Louisiana and Arkansas, the expedition established positive relations with the Caddo and Alabama-Quassarte (Coushatta) villages on the river. Freeman and Custis recorded valuable information about the peoples and ecology of the area. In part because of the diplomatic furor aroused by its interception of the expedition, Spain changed its strategy and opened the Red River country to American traders.

Because of the limited duration of the expedition, the scientists gathered little material, compared to the major discoveries of Lewis and Clark. However, Freeman's journal and Custis's pioneering natural history report gave valuable information about the American Indian peoples and the other aspects of the Red River country. Custis's work was published two decades before the expeditions of Thomas Nutall, Edwin James, and Thomas Say but was overlooked for some time.

An American explorer, Randolph B. Marcy, finally located the headwaters of the Red River in 1852.
