= David Dunbar =

David Dunbar may refer to:

- David Dunbar, of the Hope-Dunbar baronets
- David Dunbar (actor) (1886–1953), Australian film actor
- David Dunbar (colonel), 18th century surveyor of king's woods in North America, and Lt. Gov. of New Hampshire
- David Dunbar Buick (1854–1929), Scottish-born American inventor, best known for founding the Buick Motor Company
- David Dunbar-Nasmith (1921–1997), Royal Navy officer

== See also ==
- Dunbar (disambiguation)
