= Sir Charles Gordon-Cumming-Dunbar, 9th Baronet =

The Ven Sir Charles Gordon-Cumming-Dunbar, Bt
- Anglican Archdeacon of Grenada
- Church: Church of England
- See: Barbados
- In office: 1875–1877
- Previous post: Chaplain to the Bishop of Colombo

Personal details
- Born: 14 February 1844
- Died: 8 January 1916 (aged 71) Ramsgate

Charles Gordon-Cumming-Dunbar (14 February 1844 – 8 January 1916) was an Anglican priest in the late nineteenth and early twentieth centuries.

Gordon-Cumming-Dunbar was born in Elgin, Moray, in Scotland. He was educated at Winchester College and the University of Jena; and ordained in 1867. His first post was as Chaplain to the Bishop of Colombo. He later refused the chance to be the first Bishop of Pretoria but accepted the Archdeaconry of Grenada, serving from 1875 to 1877. On his return he held incumbencies at Little Heath and Walthamstow.

On 17 October 1872 he married Edith Wentworth, youngest daughter of William Charles Wentworth. He had one daughter, Beatrix Leyla Marjorie Wentworth, who died on 8 January 1919 in Ramsgate, leaving issue.

Baronetage of Nova Scotia
Preceded by Archibald Hamilton Dunbar	Baronet (of Northfield); 1910–1916	Succeeded by Archibald Edward Dunbar
