= George Dunbar =

George Dunbar may refer to:

- George Dunbar, 10th Earl of March (1338–1422)
- George II, Earl of March (c. 1370–1457), also known as George de Dunbar, 11th Earl of March
- George Dunbar (classical scholar) (1774–1851), Scottish classical scholar and lexicographer
- George Dunbar (MP) (1800–1875), Irish Member of the UK Parliament
- George Harrison Dunbar (1876–1966), Canadian politician
- George Dunbar (Pennsylvania politician) (born 1960), American politician
- Sir George Dunbar, 2nd Baronet (died 1747), of the Dunbar of Mochrum baronets
- Sir George Dunbar, 4th Baronet (died 1799), of the Dunbar of Mochrum baronets
- Sir George Dunbar, 5th Baronet (c. 1750–1811), of the Dunbar of Mochrum baronets

== See also ==
- Sir George Duff-Sutherland-Dunbar, 6th Baronet (1878–1962) of the Dunbar of Hempriggs baronets
