= Jesse Dunbar =

American colonist

Jesse Dunbar (c.1743 – April 9, 1816) was a Tory from Halifax, Massachusetts, a town in Plymouth County, located in what was then called the Province of Massachusetts Bay. In 1774, while anti-British colonists — also known as Whigs or Patriots — tried to stage a boycott on British goods, Jesse Dunbar bought some "fat cattle" from Mr. Thomas, a Mandamus Counsellor from England. The purchase was a violation of the boycott, but by no means illegal. He was approximately 31 years old at the time.

After driving the oxen back home to the town of Plymouth, Jesse Dunbar slaughtered, skinned, and hung up one of the oxen. Rumor spread about where the oxen had come from, and soon a committee of Whigs came to extralegally enforce the boycott by stuffing Jesse Dunbar into the belly of the ox carcass. After stuffing Dunbar into the belly of the ox, the Plymouth mob put the ox carcass into a cart and pushed the cart 4 miles out of town. The mob also stole three more cattle and a horse from Mr. Dunbar.

The Plymouth mob forced Jesse Dunbar to pay them one dollar for the ride. The Plymouth mob also handed over the punishment of Jesse Dunbar over to a mob from Kingston, Massachusetts. The Kingston mob put the carcass onto a cart belonging to a Mr. William Arnold.

At first, the Kingston Mob allowed Jesse Dunbar to walk alongside the ox-cart in shame (as the procession was apparently under control by a Captain Wait Wadsworth). But this brief period of merciful treatment was cut short when many boys - "collected in great numbers" according to Justin Winsor - among the mob started dancing around Jesse Dunbar for the purpose of mocking him. It is not known whether it was an accident or not, but any case, Jesse Dunbar started tripping some of the children's feet up with his own as they danced around him. The Kingston Mob was so outraged by the incident with the children that they forced him back into the belly of ox carcass with renewed violence. After 4 miles the Kingston mob handed Jesse Dunbar and the ox over to a mob in Duxborough, Massachusetts.

The Duxborough (also spelled Duxbury) mob started beating him in the face with the ox's tripe. Two sources mention the mob "endeavoring to cover his entire person in it [the inards of the ox carcass]." Jesse Dunbar almost asphyxiated from all the crowd forcing tripe into his face - "to the endangerment of his life." As he was choking on the tripe, they threw some dirt on him. After some other abuses at the Duxborough mob, the tormentors carried Jesse Dunbar to Mr. Thomas's house and tipped him out in front of the door. The sum of money that the Duxborough mob took from him is unknown. According to the Rivington Gazette, the story of his torture ends with the Duxborough mob making "him pay another sum of money, and he not taking the beef, they flung it in the road and quitted him."

Somehow Jesse Dunbar survived this incident, and may well have gone on living in Plymouth County next to the neighbors who had stolen his property and his dignity. According to his tombstone, located at the Alden or Great Woods Graveyard in Bridgewater, Plymouth County, Massachusetts, Dunbar died on April 9, 1816, at the age of 73. His epitaph reads:

"In memory of Mr. Jesse Dunbar, who died April 9, 1816, aged 73 years Honorable age is not that which standeth in length of time, Nor is it measured in number of years; but wisdom is the Gray hair unto man, and an unspotted life is old age."

His wife, Abigail Dunbar, died a year later. She was three years older than he.

Another tombstone in the graveyard shows that he had a daughter named Dinah with what must have been his first wife, Azuba. Azuba Dunbar is not buried in the cemetery.
