= Robert Nugent Dunbar =

British poet

- Born: 31 May 1798; Alphington Lodge, Exeter, Devon
- Died: 25 July 1866 (aged 68); Paris, France
- Occupations: Poet; landowner

Robert Nugent Dunbar (also Nugent-Dunbar, 31 May 1798 – 25 July 1866) was a British poet.

== Life ==
Nugent Dunbar was born in Exeter, the son of Capt. Robert Skerrett Nugent-Dunbar and Catherine Lister, daughter of Nathaniel Lister, MP of Armitage Park. He was of Scottish and Irish descent on his paternal side and the heir to Machermore Castle, Newton Stewart, Kirkcudbrightshire. His family was prominent in Antigua.

He lived many years in the Antilles and elsewhere in the West Indies. He recorded his impressions of the scenery and romance of the Western Archipelago in sundry volumes of verse, which contain many reminiscences of Byron and Moore. The notes are worth reading.

Nugent Dunbar was also the author of a slight piece, "Garibaldi at the Opera of 'Masaniello'", octavo, London, 1864. As long ago as 1817, he had mourned the death of the Princess Charlotte of Wales in The Lament of Britannia, octavo, London. He died at Paris in 1866.

Nugent Dunbar inherited the entailed estate at Machermore from his father in 1846. He married Annette Ellen Singleton-Atcheson in 1856 and left four young children upon his death. He in turn left it to his eldest son, Robert Lennox Nugent Dunbar (born 1863), held in trust by his son's tutors, with instructions to provide income to his widow and other surviving children, Ellen Catherine, Annette Roberta and Charlotte Mary Emily (who married James Burns, 3rd Baron Inverclyde). However, the estate failed to pay, and in 1872, his widow and three younger children successfully sued Robert Lennox Nugent Dunbar (still then a minor) and his trustees for back payment and interest.

== Writings ==
The titles of his poems are:

1. The Cruise; or, a Prospect of the West Indian Archipelago: a Tropical Sketch, with Notes, Historical and Illustrative, octavo, London, 1835.
2. The Caraguin: a Tale of the Antilles, octavo, London, 1837.
3. Indian Hours; or Passion and Poetry of the Tropics. Comprising the Nuptials of Barcelona and the Music Shell, octavo, London, 1839. The Nuptials of Barcelona was afterwards published separately, octavo, London, 1851.
4. Beauties of Tropical Scenery; Lyrical Sketches, and Love-Songs. With Notes, Historical and Illustrative, octavo, London, 1862; 2nd edition octavo, London, 1864; 3rd edition, with additions, octavo, London, 1866.
