= Dunbar baronets of Mochrum (1694) =

Escutcheon of the Dunbar baronets of Mochrum

The Dunbar baronetcy, of Mochrum, Wigtownshire, was created for James Dunbar in the Baronetage of Nova Scotia on 29 March 1694. He married, firstly, Isabel Nicholson, daughter of the 2nd of the Nicolson Baronets of Carnock (1636), and through her came into the estate of Plean, Stirlingshire.

== Dunbar baronets of Mochrum (1694) ==
- Sir James Dunbar, 1st Baronet (died 1718)
- Sir George Dunbar, 2nd Baronet (died 1747)
- Sir James Dunbar, 3rd Baronet (died 1782)
- Sir George Dunbar, 4th Baronet (died 1799)
- Sir George Dunbar, 5th Baronet (c. 1750–1811)
- Sir William Rowe Dunbar, 6th Baronet (1776–1841)
- Sir William Dunbar, 7th Baronet (1812–1889)
- Sir Uthred James Hay Dunbar, 8th Baronet (1843–1904)
- Sir William Cospatrick Dunbar, 9th Baronet (1844–1931)
- Sir James George Hawker Rowland Dunbar, 10th Baronet (1862–1953)
- Sir Richard Sutherland Dunbar, 11th Baronet (1873–1953), a photographer's artist, first cousin once removed of Sir James Dunbar, 10th Baronet. He held the title for only two days before his death; issue two daughters.
- Sir Adrian Ivor Dunbar, 12th Baronet (1893–1977), who was working as a handyman in Upper Fairmount, Maryland, before inheriting the title from his first cousin.
- Sir Jean Ivor Dunbar, 13th Baronet (1918–1993)
- Sir James Michael Dunbar, 14th Baronet (born 1950)

The heir apparent is the present holder's son Michael Joseph Dunbar (born 1980).
