= Dunbar Theatre =

Dunbar Theatre may refer to:

- Dunbar Theatre (Kansas), a movie theatre in Wichita, Kansas
- Dunbar Theatre (Philadelphia), a theatre and jazz venue in Philadelphia, Pennsylvania
