= Gavin Dunbar =

Gavin Dunbar may refer to:

- Gavin Dunbar (bishop of Aberdeen) (died 1532)
- Gavin Dunbar (archbishop of Glasgow) (c. 1490–1547)
- Gavin Dunbar (musician), bass player with Camera Obscura
