= Dunbar baronets of Northfield (1700) =

Escutcheon of the Dunbar baronets of Northfield

The Dunbar baronetcy of Northfield was created for William Dunbar of Hempriggs House, Caithness, on 10 April 1700. He had served as a Member of the Scottish Parliament for Caithness constituency.

== Dunbar baronets of Northfield (1700) ==
- Sir William Dunbar, 1st Baronet (died 1711)
- Sir Robert Dunbar, 2nd Baronet (died 1742)
- Sir Patrick Dunbar, 3rd Baronet (c. 1676–1763)
- Sir Archibald Dunbar, 4th Baronet (c. 1693–1769)
- Sir Alexander Dunbar, 5th Baronet (1742–1791)
- Sir Archibald Dunbar, 6th Baronet (1772–1847)
- Sir Archibald Dunbar, 7th Baronet (1803–1898)
- Sir Archibald Hamilton Dunbar, 8th Baronet (1828–1910)
- Sir Charles Gordon-Cumming-Dunbar, 9th Baronet (1844–1916)
- Sir Archibald Edward Dunbar, 10th Baronet (1889–1969)
- Sir Archibald Ranulph Dunbar, 11th Baronet (1927–2015)
- Sir Edward Horace Dunbar, 12th Baronet (b. 1977)

The Dunbar baronets of Northfield have lived at the Duffus estate, Duffus, Elgin, since the 17th century.
