= Louisiana Purchase =

1803 acquisition of region of Middle America land by the U.S. from France

Louisiana Purchase Vente de la Louisiane
- Expansion of the United States
- 1803–1804
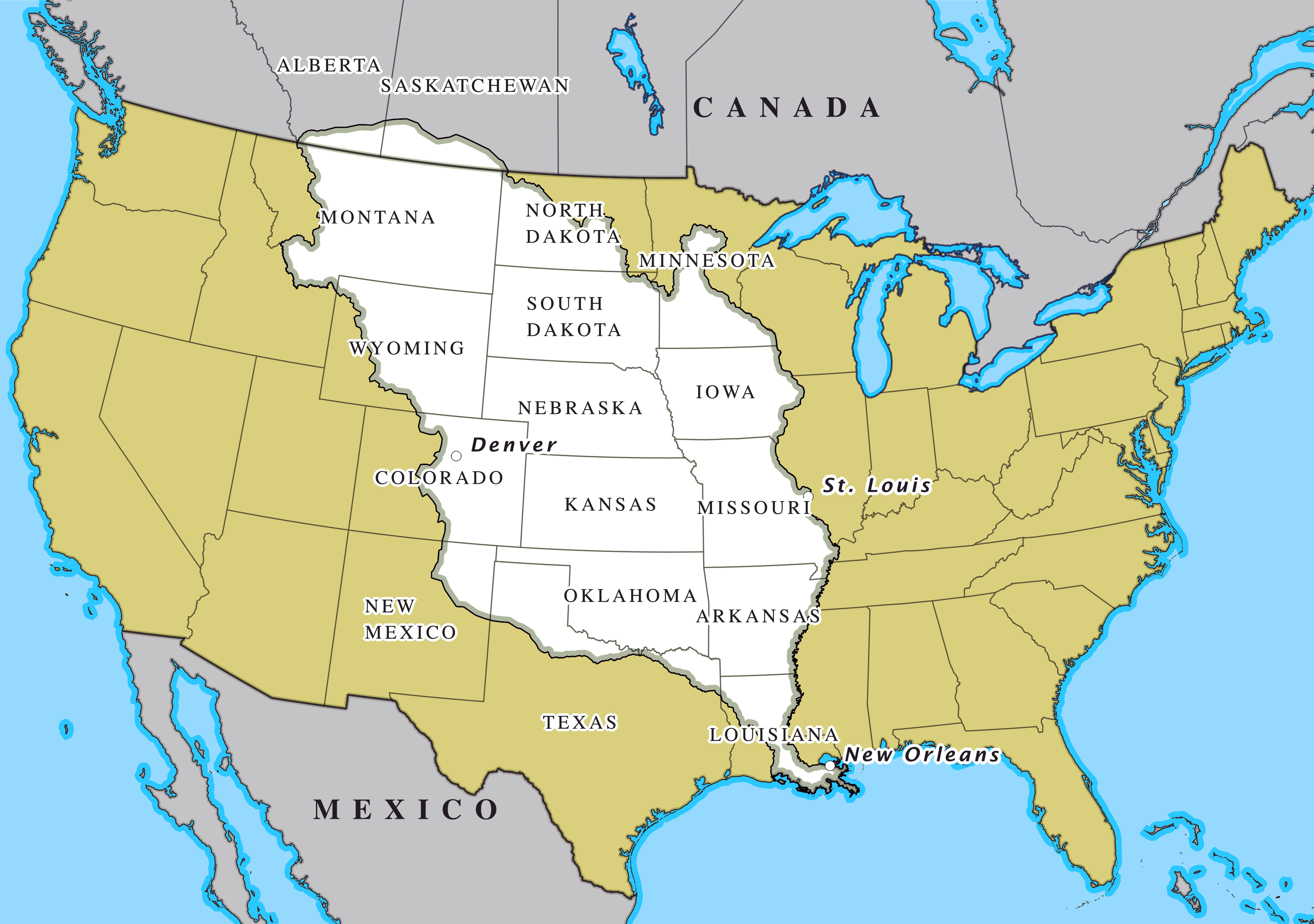
- Modern map of the United States overlapped with territory bought in the Louisiana Purchase (in white)
- History
  - Established: July 4, 1803
  - Disestablished: October 1, 1804
Preceded by	Succeeded by
Louisiana (New France)	District of Louisiana; Territory of Orleans
- Today part of: United States; Arkansas; Colorado; Iowa; Kansas; Louisiana; Minnesota; Missouri; Montana; Nebraska; New Mexico; North Dakota; Oklahoma; South Dakota; Texas; Wyoming; Canada; Alberta; Saskatchewan

The Louisiana Purchase (French: Vente de la Louisiane, lit. 'Sale of Louisiana') was the acquisition of the territory of Louisiana by the United States from the French First Republic in 1803. This consisted of most of the land in the Mississippi River's drainage basin west of the river. In return for $15 million, (Note: About $380 million at 2024 prices.) or approximately $18 per square mile (Note: About $456 per sq. mi. at 2024 prices.) ($7/km^{2}), the United States nominally acquired a total of 828,000 sq mi (2,140,000 km^{2}; 530,000,000 acres) of land now in the Central United States. However, France only controlled a small fraction of this area, most of which was inhabited by Native Americans; effectively, for the majority of the area, the United States bought the preemptive right to obtain Indian lands by treaty or by conquest, to the exclusion of other colonial powers.

The Kingdom of France had controlled the Louisiana territory from 1682 until it was ceded to Spain in 1762. In 1800, Napoleon Bonaparte, the First Consul of the French Republic, regained ownership of Louisiana in exchange for territories in Tuscany as part of a broader effort to re-establish a French colonial empire in North America. However, France's failure to suppress a revolt in Saint-Domingue in the Caribbean, coupled with the prospect of renewed warfare with the United Kingdom, prompted Napoleon to consider selling Louisiana to the United States.

Acquisition of Louisiana was a long-term goal of President Thomas Jefferson, who was especially eager to gain control of the crucial Mississippi River port of New Orleans. Jefferson tasked James Monroe and Robert R. Livingston with purchasing New Orleans. Negotiating with French Treasury Minister François Barbé-Marbois, the U.S. representatives quickly agreed to purchase the entire territory of Louisiana after it was offered. Overcoming the opposition of the Federalist Party, Jefferson and Secretary of State James Madison persuaded Congress to ratify and fund the Louisiana Purchase.

The Louisiana Purchase extended United States sovereignty across the Mississippi River, nearly doubling the nominal size of the country. The purchase included land from fifteen present U.S. states and two Canadian provinces, including the entirety of Arkansas, Missouri, Iowa, Oklahoma, Kansas, and Nebraska; large portions of North Dakota and South Dakota; the area of Montana, Wyoming, and Colorado east of the Continental Divide; the portion of Minnesota west of the Mississippi River; the northeastern section of New Mexico; northern portions of Texas; New Orleans and the portions of the present state of Louisiana west of the Mississippi River; and small portions of land within Alberta and Saskatchewan. At the time of the purchase, the territory of Louisiana's non-native population was around 60,000 inhabitants, of whom half were enslaved Africans. The western borders of the purchase were later settled by the 1819 Adams–Onís Treaty with Spain, while the northern borders of the purchase were adjusted by the Treaty of 1818 with the British.

The Louisiana Purchase corresponds, nowadays, to more than 26% of the present area of the contiguous United States, which is 2,959,064.44 square miles (7,663,941.7 km^{2}).

== Background ==
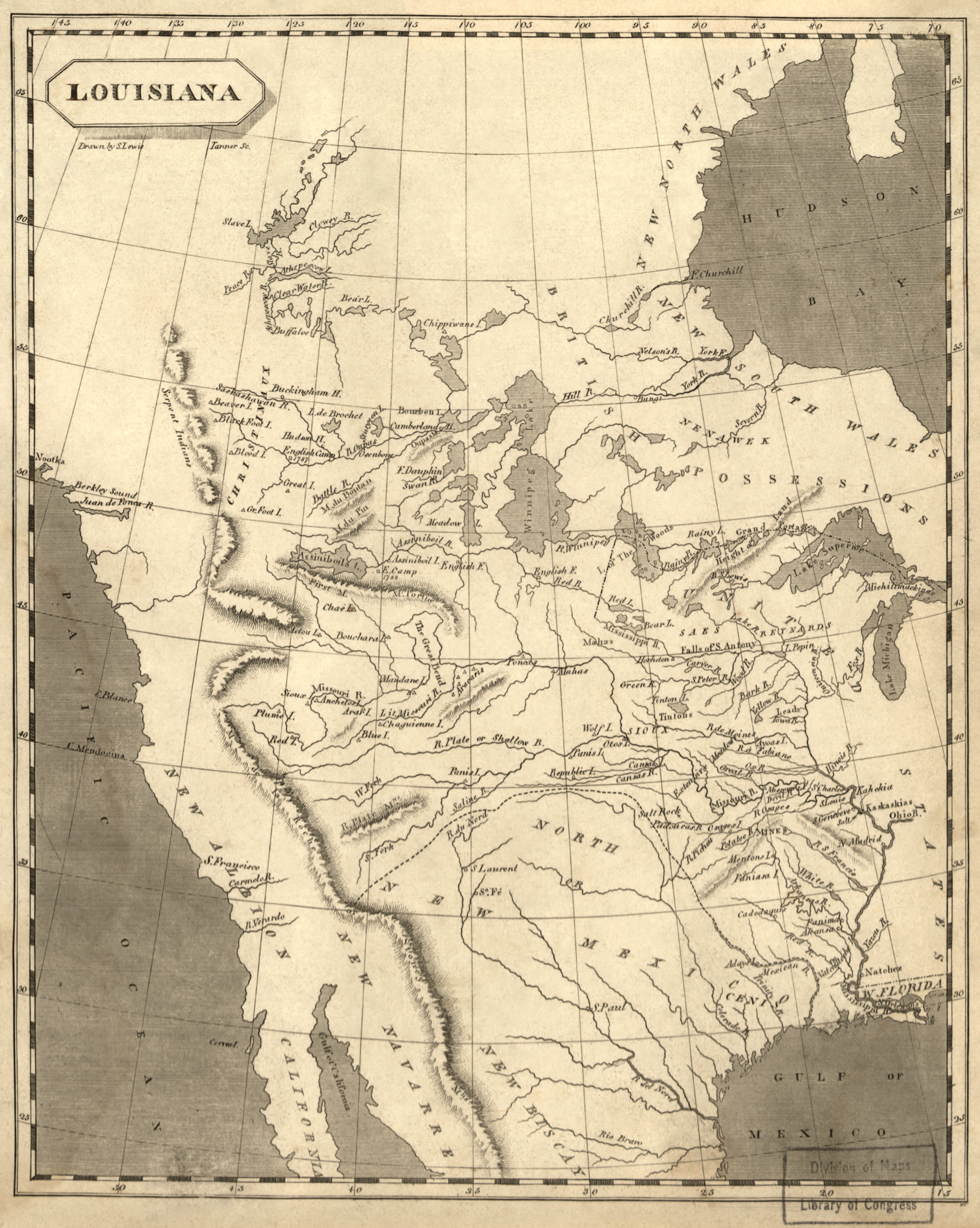
An 1804 map of "Louisiana", bounded on the west by the Rocky Mountains

Throughout the second half of the 18th century, the French colony of Louisiana became a pawn for European political intrigue. The colony was the most substantial presence of France's overseas empire, though its population was sparse and largely concentrated in small settlements along the Mississippi River and its tributaries. France ceded the territory to Spain in 1762 in the secret Treaty of Fontainebleau. Following French defeat in the Seven Years' War, Spain gained control of the territory west of the Mississippi, and the British received the territory to the east of the river.

Following the establishment of the United States, the Americans controlled the area east of the Mississippi and north of New Orleans. The main issue for the Americans was free transit of the Mississippi out to sea. As the lands were being gradually settled by American migrants, many Americans, including Jefferson, assumed that the territory would be acquired "piece by piece". The risk of another power taking it from a weakened Spain made a "profound reconsideration" of this policy necessary.

New Orleans was already important for shipping agricultural goods to and from the areas of the United States west of the Appalachian Mountains. Pinckney's Treaty, signed with Spain on October 27, 1795, gave American merchants "right of deposit" in New Orleans, granting them use of the port to store goods for export. The treaty also recognized American rights to navigate the entire Mississippi, which had become vital to the growing trade of the western territories.

In 1798, Spain revoked the treaty allowing American use of New Orleans, greatly upsetting the Americans. In 1801, Spanish Governor Don Juan Manuel de Salcedo took over from the Marquess of Casa Calvo, and restored the American right to deposit goods. However, in 1800, Spain had ceded the Louisiana territory back to France as part of Napoleon's secret Third Treaty of San Ildefonso. The subsequent 1801 Treaty of Aranjuez established that Spain's cession of Louisiana was a "restoration" of the territory to France, not a retrocession. The territory nominally remained under Spanish control, until a transfer of power to France on November 30, 1803, just three weeks before the formal cession of the territory to the United States on December 20, 1803.

== Negotiation ==
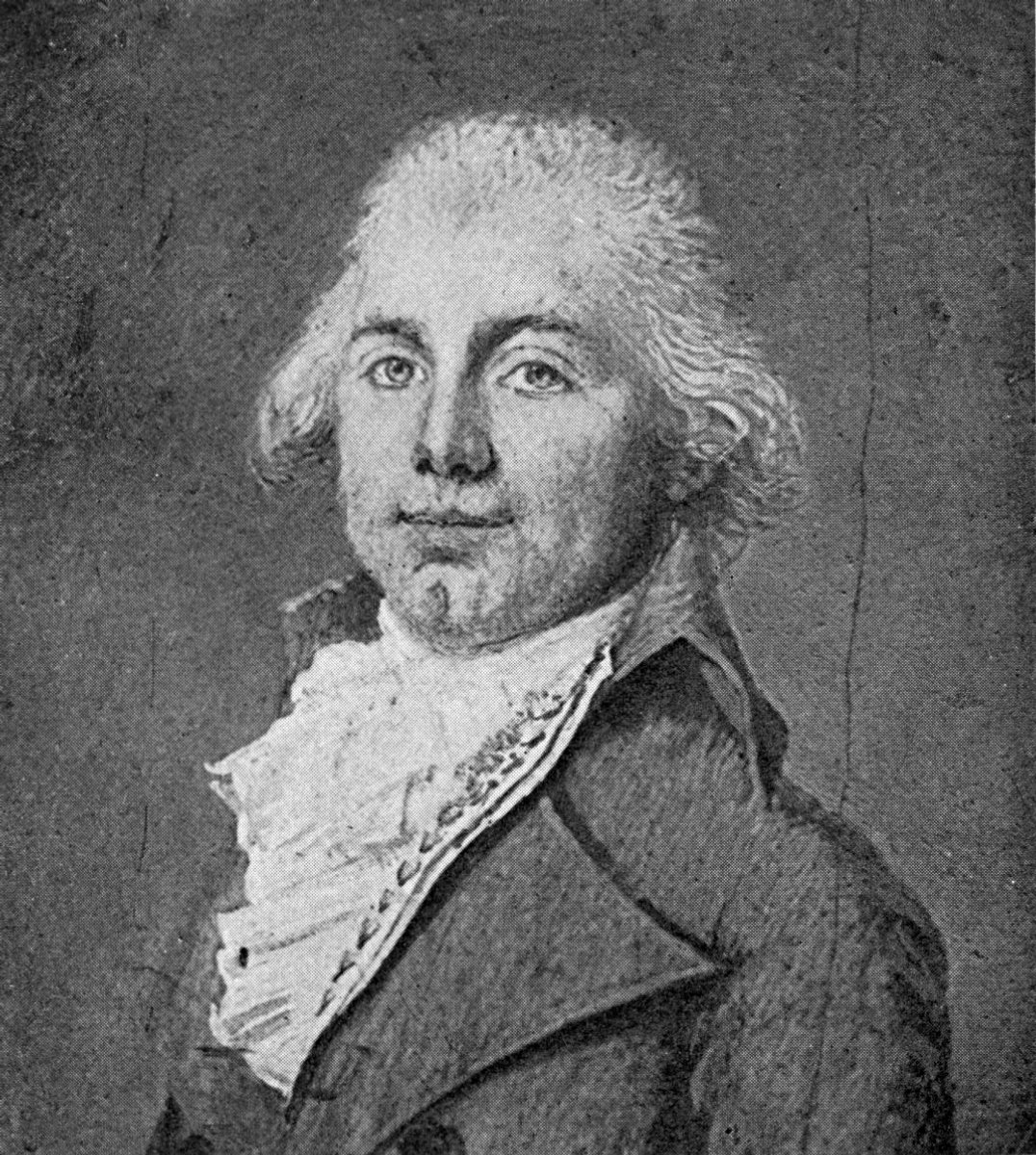
The future president James Monroe as envoy extraordinary and minister plenipotentiary to France helped Robert R. Livingston in negotiating the Louisiana Purchase.

While the treaty between Spain and France went largely unnoticed in 1800, fear of an eventual French invasion spread across America when, in 1801, Napoleon sent a military force to nearby Saint-Domingue. Though Jefferson urged moderation, Federalists sought to use this against Jefferson and called for hostilities against France. Undercutting them, Jefferson threatened an alliance with Britain, although relations were uneasy in that direction. In 1801, Jefferson supported France in its plan to take back Saint-Domingue (present-day Haiti), which was then under control of Toussaint Louverture after a slave rebellion. However, there was a growing concern in the U.S. that Napoleon would send troops to New Orleans after quelling the rebellion. In hopes of securing control of the mouth of the Mississippi, Jefferson sent Livingston to Paris in 1801 with the authorization to purchase New Orleans.

In December 1801, France sent General Charles Leclerc, Napoleon's brother-in-law, on an expedition to Saint-Domingue to reassert French control over the colony, which had become essentially autonomous under Louverture. Louverture, as a French general, had fended off incursions from other European powers, but had also begun to consolidate power for himself on the island. Before the revolution, France had derived enormous wealth from Saint-Domingue at the cost of the lives and freedom of the enslaved. Napoleon wanted the territory's revenues and productivity for France restored. Alarmed over the French actions and its intention to re-establish an empire in North America, Jefferson declared neutrality in relation to the Caribbean, refusing credit and other assistance to the French, but allowing war contraband to get through to the rebels to prevent France from regaining a foothold.

In 1803, Pierre Samuel du Pont de Nemours, a French nobleman, began to help negotiate with France at the request of Jefferson. Du Pont was living in the United States at the time and had close ties to Jefferson as well as the prominent politicians in France. He engaged in back-channel diplomacy with Napoleon on Jefferson's behalf during a visit to France and introduced the idea of the much larger Louisiana Purchase as a way to defuse potential conflict between the United States and Napoleon over North America.

Throughout this time, Jefferson had up-to-date intelligence on Napoleon's military activities and intentions in North America. Part of his evolving strategy involved giving du Pont some information that was withheld from Livingston. Intent on avoiding possible war with France, Jefferson sent James Monroe to Paris in 1803 to negotiate a settlement, with instructions to go to London to negotiate an alliance if the talks in Paris failed. Spain procrastinated until late 1802 in executing the treaty to transfer Louisiana to France, which allowed American hostility to build. Also, Spain's refusal to cede Florida to France meant that Louisiana would be indefensible.

Napoleon needed peace with Britain to take possession of Louisiana. Otherwise, Louisiana would be an easy prey for a potential invasion from Britain or the U.S. But in early 1803, continuing war between France and Britain seemed unavoidable. On March 11, 1803, Napoleon began planning an invasion of Great Britain.

In Saint-Domingue, Leclerc's forces took Louverture prisoner, but their expedition soon faltered in the face of fierce resistance and disease. By early 1803, Napoleon decided to abandon his plans to rebuild France's New World empire. Without sufficient revenues from sugar colonies in the Caribbean, Louisiana had little value to him. Spain had not yet completed the transfer of Louisiana to France, and war between France and the UK was imminent. Out of anger towards Spain and the unique opportunity to sell something that was useless and not truly his yet, Napoleon decided to sell the entire territory.

Although the foreign minister Talleyrand opposed the plan, on April 10, 1803, Napoleon told the Treasury Minister François Barbé-Marbois that he was considering selling the Louisiana Territory to the United States. On April 11, 1803, just days before Monroe's arrival, Barbé-Marbois offered Livingston all of Louisiana for $15 million, which averages to less than three cents per acre (7¢/ha). The total of $15 million is equivalent to about $380 million in 2024 dollars, or 72 cents per acre. The American representatives were prepared to pay up to $10 million for New Orleans and its environs but were dumbfounded when the vastly larger territory was offered for $15 million. Jefferson had authorized Livingston only to purchase New Orleans. However, Livingston was certain that the United States would accept the offer.

The Americans thought that Napoleon might withdraw the offer at any time, preventing the United States from acquiring New Orleans, so they agreed and signed the Louisiana Purchase Treaty on April 30, 1803 (10 Floréal XI in the French Republican calendar) at the Hôtel Tubeuf in Paris. The signers were Robert Livingston, James Monroe, and François Barbé-Marbois. After the signing Livingston famously stated, "We have lived long, but this is the noblest work of our whole lives ... From this day the United States take their place among the powers of the first rank." On July 4, 1803, the treaty was announced, but the documents did not arrive in Washington, D.C. until July 14. The Louisiana Territory was vast, stretching from the Gulf of Mexico in the south to Rupert's Land in the north, and from the Mississippi River in the east to the Rocky Mountains in the west. Acquiring the territory nearly doubled the size of the United States.

In November 1803, France withdrew its 7,000 surviving troops from Saint-Domingue (more than two-thirds of its troops died there) and gave up its ambitions in the Western Hemisphere. In 1804, Haiti declared its independence; but fearing a slave revolt at home, Jefferson and the rest of Congress refused to recognize the new republic, the second in the Western Hemisphere, and imposed a trade embargo against it. This, together with the successful French demand for an indemnity of 150 million francs in 1825, severely hampered Haiti's ability to repair its economy after decades of war.

== Domestic opposition and constitutionality ==
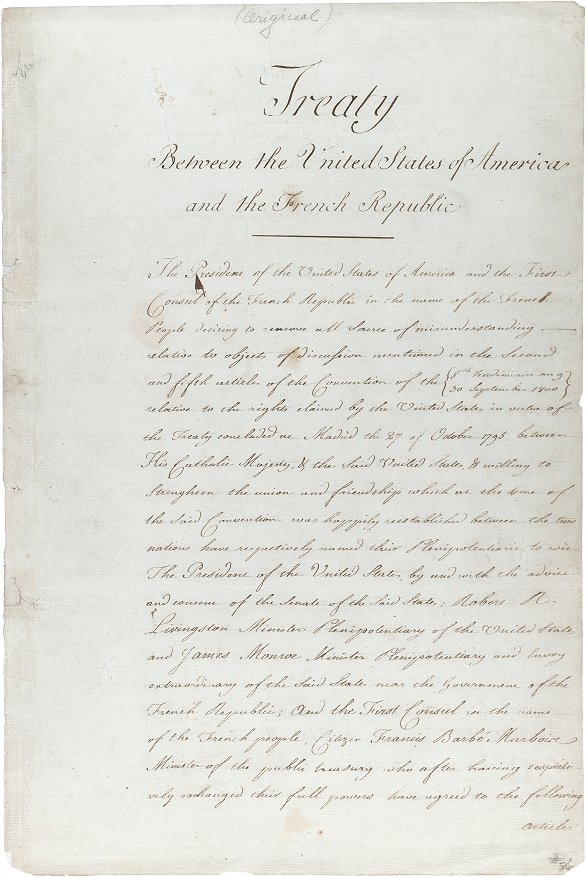
The original treaty of the Louisiana Purchase

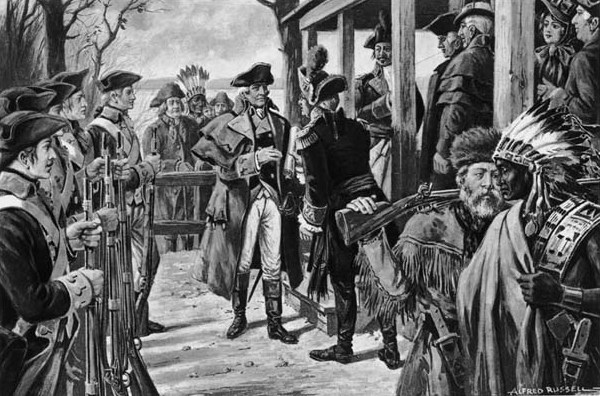
Transfer of Louisiana by Ford P. Kaiser for the Louisiana Purchase Exposition (1904)

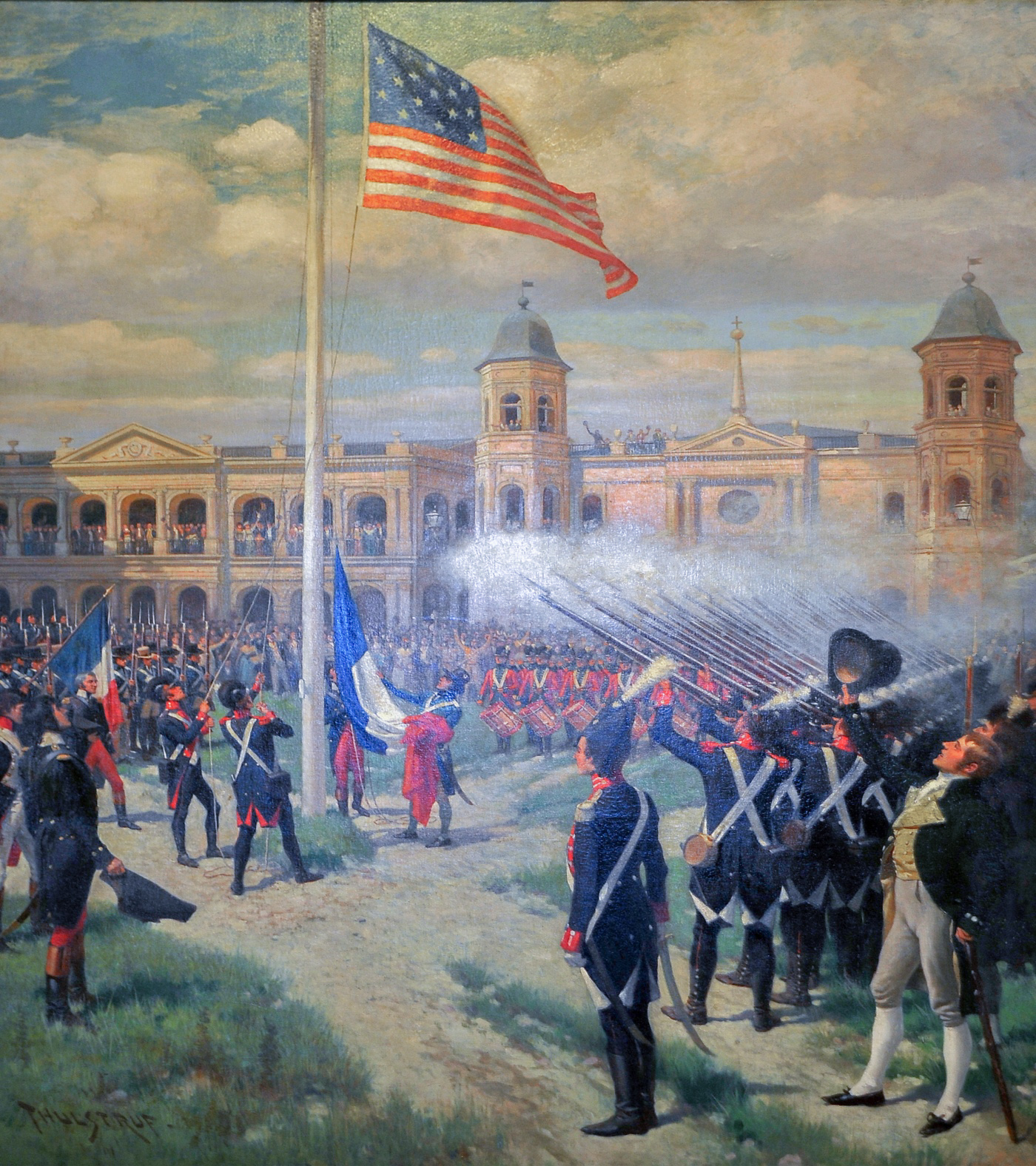
Flag raising in the Place d'Armes (now Jackson Square), New Orleans, marking the transfer of sovereignty over French Louisiana to the United States, December 20, 1803, as depicted by Thure de Thulstrup in 1902

After Monroe and Livingston had returned from France with news of the purchase, an official announcement of the purchase was made on July 4, 1803. This gave Jefferson and his cabinet until October, when the treaty had to be ratified, to discuss the constitutionality of the purchase. Jefferson considered a constitutional amendment to justify the purchase; however, his cabinet convinced him otherwise. Jefferson justified the purchase by rationalizing, "it is the case of a guardian, investing the money of his ward in purchasing an important adjacent territory; & saying to him when of age, I did this for your good." Jefferson ultimately came to the conclusion before the ratification of the treaty that the purchase was to protect the citizens of the United States therefore making it constitutional.

Henry Adams and other historians have argued that Jefferson acted hypocritically with the Louisiana Purchase, because of his position as a strict constructionist regarding the Constitution, by stretching the intent of that document to justify his purchase. The American purchase of the Louisiana territory was not accomplished without domestic opposition. Jefferson's philosophical consistency was in question and many people believed he and others, including James Madison, were doing something they surely would have argued against with Alexander Hamilton. The Federalists strongly opposed the purchase, because of the cost involved, their belief that France would not have been able to resist U.S. and British encroachment into Louisiana, and Jefferson's perceived hypocrisy.

Both Federalists and Jeffersonians were concerned over the purchase's constitutionality. Many members of the House of Representatives opposed the purchase. Majority Leader John Randolph led the opposition. The Federalists feared that the power of the Atlantic seaboard states would be threatened by the new citizens in the West, whose political and economic priorities were bound to conflict with those of the merchants and bankers of New England. There was also concern that an increase in the number of slave-holding states created out of the new territory would exacerbate divisions between North and South. A group of Northern Federalists led by Senator Timothy Pickering of Massachusetts went so far as to explore the idea of a separate northern confederacy. The House called for a vote to deny the request for the purchase, but it failed by two votes, 59–57. The Federalists even tried to prove the land belonged to Spain, not France, but available records proved otherwise.

The opposition of New England Federalists to the Louisiana Purchase was primarily economic self-interest, not any legitimate concern over constitutionality or whether France indeed owned Louisiana or was required to sell it back to Spain should it desire to dispose of the territory. The Northerners were not enthusiastic about Western farmers gaining another outlet for their crops that did not require the use of New England ports. Also, many Federalists were speculators in lands in upstate New York and New England and were hoping to sell these lands to farmers, who might go west instead if the Louisiana Purchase went through. They also feared that this would lead to Western states being formed, which would likely be Republican, and dilute the political power of New England Federalists.

Another concern was whether it was proper to grant citizenship to the French, Spanish, and free black people living in New Orleans, as the treaty would dictate. Critics in Congress worried whether these "foreigners", unacquainted with democracy, could or should become citizens.

Spain protested the transfer on two grounds: First, France had previously promised in a note not to alienate Louisiana to a third party and, second, France had not fulfilled the Third Treaty of San Ildefonso by having the King of Etruria recognized by all European powers. The French government replied that these objections were baseless as the promise not to alienate Louisiana was not in the treaty of San Ildefonso itself and therefore had no legal force, and the Spanish government had ordered Louisiana to be transferred in October 1802 despite knowing for months that Britain had not recognized the King of Etruria in the Treaty of Amiens. Madison, in response to Spain's objections, noted that the United States had first approached Spain about purchasing the property, but had been told by Spain itself that the U.S. would have to deal with France for the territory.

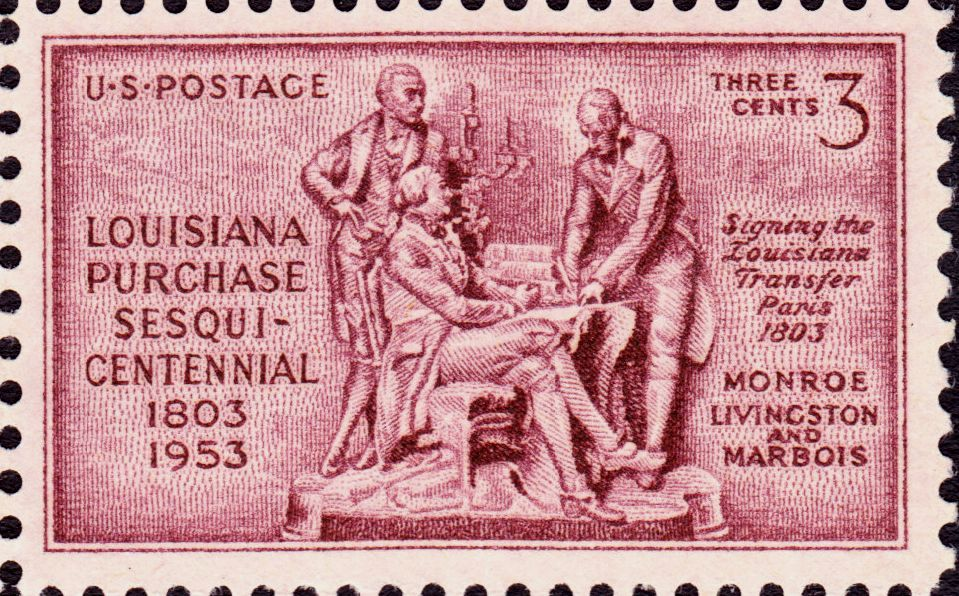
Issue of 1953, commemorating the 150th anniversary of signing

Henry Adams claimed "The sale of Louisiana to the United States was trebly invalid; if it were French property, Bonaparte could not constitutionally alienate it without the consent of the French Chambers; if it were Spanish property, he could not alienate it at all; if Spain had a right of reclamation, his sale was worthless." The sale, of course, was not "worthless"—the U.S. actually did take possession. Furthermore, the Spanish prime minister had authorized the U.S. to negotiate with the French government regarding "the acquisition of territories which may suit their interests." Spain turned the territory over to France in a ceremony in New Orleans on November 30, a month before France turned the city over to American officials.

Other historians counter the above arguments regarding Jefferson's alleged hypocrisy by asserting that countries change their borders in two ways: (1) conquest, or (2) an agreement between nations, otherwise known as a treaty. The Louisiana Purchase was the latter, a treaty. Article II, Section 2, of the Constitution specifically grants the president the power to negotiate treaties, which is what Jefferson did.

Madison (the "Father of the Constitution") assured Jefferson that the Louisiana Purchase was well within even the strictest interpretation of the Constitution. Treasury Secretary Albert Gallatin added that because the power to negotiate treaties was specifically granted to the president, the only way extending the country's territory by treaty could not be a presidential power would be if it were specifically excluded by the Constitution (which it was not). Jefferson, as a strict constructionist, was right to be concerned about staying within the bounds of the Constitution, but felt the power of these arguments and was willing to "acquiesce with satisfaction" if the Congress approved the treaty. The Senate quickly ratified the treaty, and the House, with equal readiness, authorized the required funding. The fledgling United States did not have $15 million in its treasury; instead, it borrowed the sum from British and Dutch banks, at an annual interest rate of six percent. (See § Financing below.)

The United States Senate consented to ratification of the treaty with a vote of 24 to seven on October 20. On the following day, October 21, 1803, the Senate authorized Jefferson to take possession of the territory and establish a temporary military government. In legislation enacted on October 31, Congress made temporary provisions for local civil government to continue as it had under French and Spanish rule and authorized the president to use military forces to maintain order. Plans were also set forth for several missions to explore and chart the territory, the most famous being the Lewis and Clark Expedition.

== Formal transfers and initial organization ==
France turned over New Orleans, the historic colonial capital, on December 20, 1803, at the Cabildo, with a flag-raising ceremony in the Plaza de Armas, now Jackson Square. Just three weeks earlier, on November 30, 1803, Spanish officials had formally conveyed the colonial lands and their administration to France.

On March 9 and 10, 1804, another ceremony, commemorated as Three Flags Day, was conducted in St. Louis, to transfer ownership of Upper Louisiana from Spain to France, and then from France to the United States. From March 10 to September 30, 1804, Upper Louisiana was supervised as a military district, under its first civil commandant, Amos Stoddard, who was appointed by the War Department.

Effective October 1, 1804, the purchased territory was organized into the Territory of Orleans (most of which would become the state of Louisiana) and the District of Louisiana, which was temporarily under control of the governor and judicial system of the Indiana Territory. The following year, the District of Louisiana was renamed the Territory of Louisiana. New Orleans was the administrative capital of the Orleans Territory, and St. Louis was the capital of the Louisiana Territory.

== Financing ==
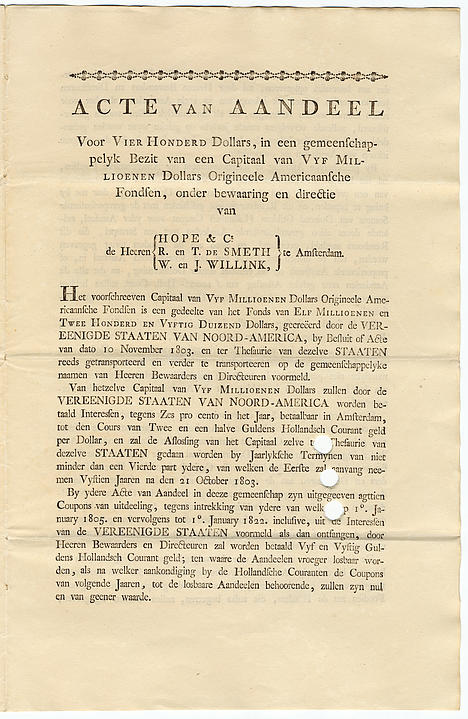
Share issued by Hope & Co. in 1804 to finance the Louisiana Purchase

To pay for the land, the American government used a mix of sovereign bonds and the assumption of French debts. Earlier in 1803, Francis Baring and Company of London had become the U.S. government's official banking agent in London following the failure of Bird, Savage & Bird. Because of this favored position, the U.S. asked Barings to handle the transaction. Barings had a close relationship with Hope & Co. of Amsterdam, and the two banking houses worked together to facilitate and underwrite the purchase. Hopes brought to the transaction experience with issuing sovereign bonds and Barings brought its American connections.

Francis Baring's son Alexander and Pierre Labouchère from Hopes arrived in Paris in April 1803 to assist with the negotiations. With the bankers' help, the French and American negotiators settled on a price of 80 million francs ($15 million), down from an initial price of 100 million francs, a sum the Americans could not afford and the financers could not provide. In the final agreement, the value of the U.S. currency was set at 5 3333/10000 francs per U.S. dollar. In 2024 dollars, the $15 million purchase price is equivalent to about $380 million.

As part of the deal, the U.S. assumed responsibility for up to 20 million francs ($3.75 million) of French debts owed to U.S. citizens. The remaining 60 million francs ($11.25 million) were financed through U.S. government bonds carrying 6% interest, redeemable between 1819 and 1822. In October 1803, the U.S. Treasury had some $5.86 million in specie on hand, $2 million of which would be used to pay a portion of the debts assumed from France as part of the purchase.

Because Napoleon wanted to receive his money as quickly as possible, Barings and Hopes purchased the bonds for 52 million francs, agreeing to an initial 6 million franc payment upon issuance of the bonds followed by 23 monthly payments of 2 million francs each. The first group of bonds were issued on January 16, 1804, but the banks had already provided a 10 million franc advance to France in July 1803.

In need of funds, Napoleon pressed the banks to complete their purchase of the bonds as quickly as possible. In April 1804, the banks transferred an additional 40.35 million francs to fully discharge their obligations to France. In the end, Barings and Hopes acquired the $11.25 million in bonds for just $9.44 million. The last of the bonds were paid off by the United States Treasury in 1823. With interest, the total cost of the Louisiana Purchase bonds amounted to $23,313,567.73.

Despite France and Britain being belligerents in the War of the Third Coalition, which began before the purchase was completed, the British government initially allowed the deal to proceed as it was better for the neutral Americans to own the territory than the hostile French. In December 1803, the British directed Barings to halt future payments to France. Barings relayed the order to Hopes, which agreed but under the condition that Baring bear the costs of the change and that its Louisiana stock be reallocated to Hopes. Hopes also required Baring to refrain from trading in Louisiana stock without its consent. In April 1804, the final payments were made to France.

== Boundaries ==
A dispute soon arose between Spain and the United States regarding the extent of Louisiana. The territory's boundaries had not been defined in the 1762 Treaty of Fontainebleau that ceded it from France to Spain, nor in the 1801 Third Treaty of San Ildefonso ceding it back to France, nor the 1803 Louisiana Purchase agreement ceding it to the United States.

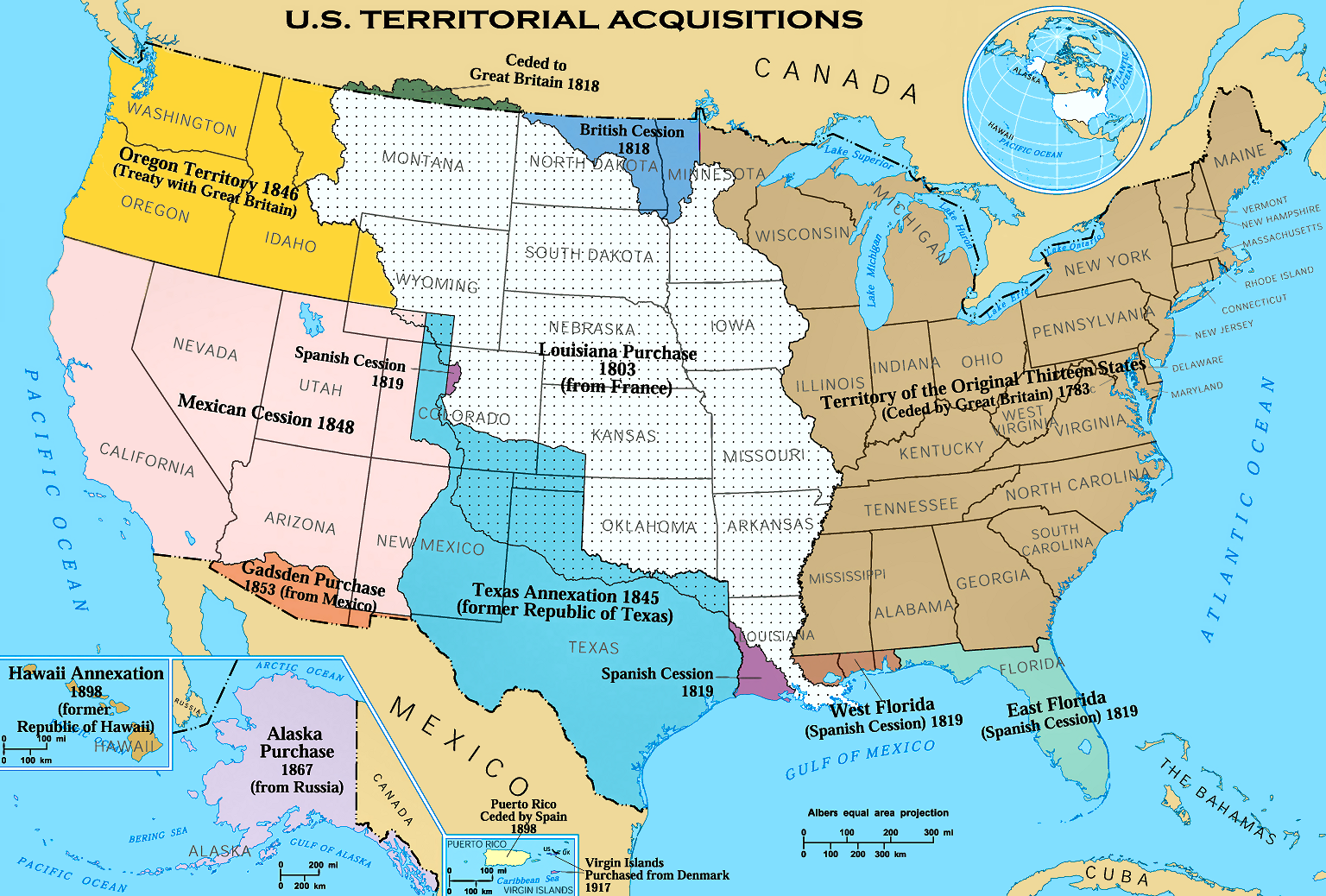
The Purchase was one of several territorial additions to the U.S.

The U.S. claimed that Louisiana included the entire western portion of the Mississippi River drainage basin to the crest of the Rocky Mountains and land extending to the Rio Grande and West Florida. Spain insisted that Louisiana comprised no more than the western bank of the Mississippi River and the cities of New Orleans and St. Louis. The dispute was ultimately resolved by the Adams–Onís Treaty of 1819, with the United States gaining most of what it had claimed in the west.

The relatively narrow Louisiana of New Spain had been a special province under the jurisdiction of the Captaincy General of Cuba, while the vast region to the west was in 1803 still considered part of the Commandancy General of the Provincias Internas. Louisiana had never been considered one of New Spain's internal provinces. If the territory included all the tributaries of the Mississippi on its western bank, the northern reaches of the purchase extended into the equally ill-defined British possession—Rupert's Land of British North America, now part of Canada. The purchase originally extended just beyond the 50th parallel. However, the territory north of the 49th parallel (including the Milk River and Poplar River watersheds) was ceded to the UK in exchange for parts of the Red River Basin south of 49th parallel in the Anglo-American Convention of 1818.

The eastern boundary of the Louisiana purchase was the Mississippi River, from its source to the 31st parallel, though the source of the Mississippi was, at the time, unknown. The eastern boundary below the 31st parallel was unclear. The U.S. claimed the land as far as the Perdido River, and Spain claimed that the border of its Florida Colony remained the Mississippi River. The Adams–Onís Treaty with Spain resolved the issue upon ratification in 1821. Today, the 31st parallel is the northern boundary of the western half of the Florida Panhandle, and the Perdido is the western boundary of Florida.

Because the western boundary was contested at the time of the purchase, President Jefferson immediately began to organize four missions to explore and map the new territory. All four started from the Mississippi River. The Lewis and Clark Expedition (1804) traveled up the Missouri River; the Red River Expedition (1806) explored the Red River basin; the Pike Expedition (1806) also started up the Missouri but turned south to explore the Arkansas River watershed. In addition, the Dunbar and Hunter Expedition (1804–1805) explored the Ouachita River watershed.

The maps and journals of the explorers helped to define the boundaries during the negotiations leading to the Adams–Onís Treaty, which set the western boundary as follows: north up the Sabine River from the Gulf of Mexico to its intersection with the 32nd parallel, due north to the Red River, up the Red River to the 100th meridian, north to the Arkansas River, up the Arkansas River to its headwaters, due north to the 42nd parallel and due west to its previous boundary.

== Slavery ==
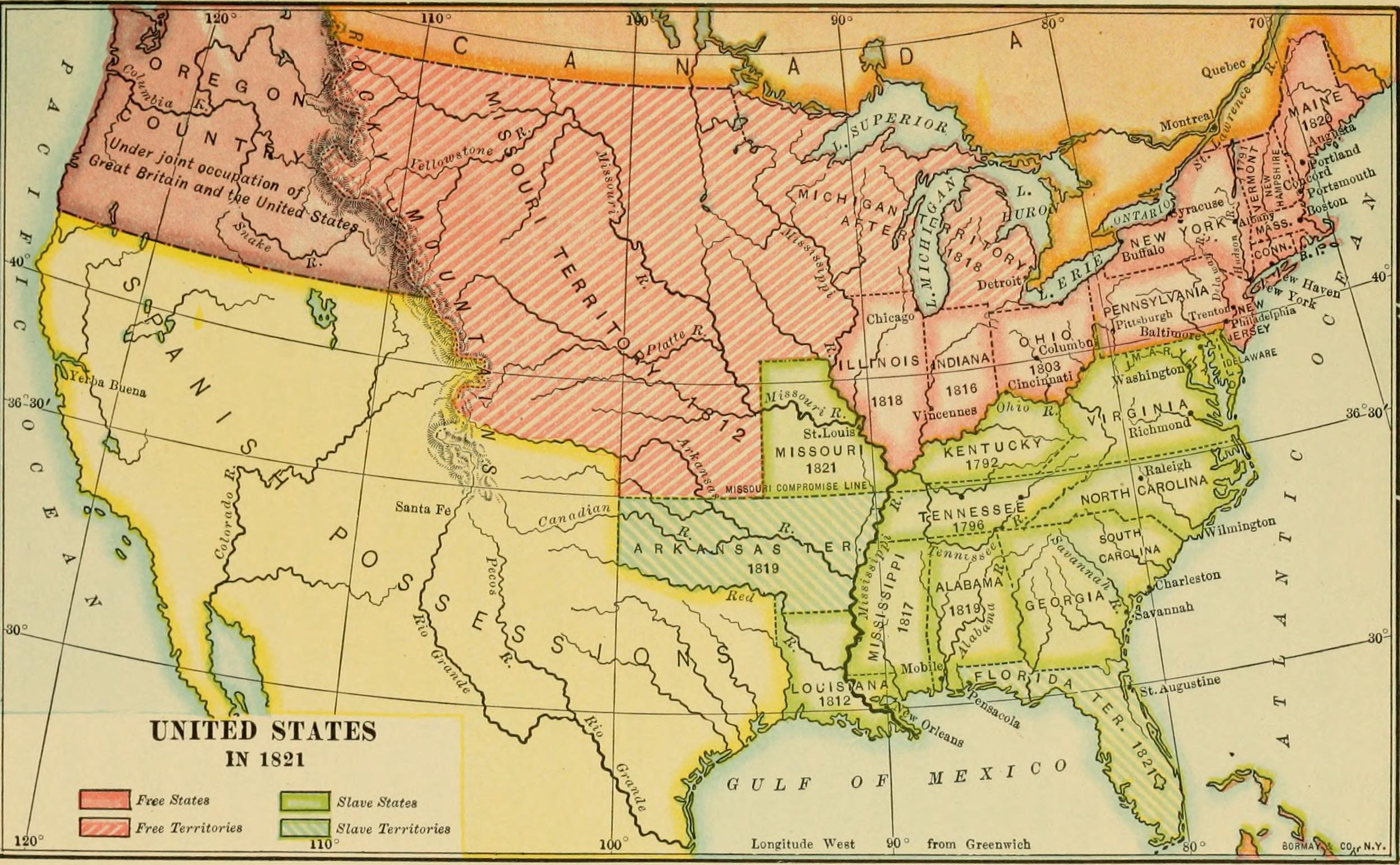
Map showing the division of free and slave territory in the United States as a result of the Missouri Compromise of 1820

Governing the Louisiana Territory was more difficult than acquiring it. Its European peoples primarily of ethnic French, Spanish and Mexican descent were largely Catholic; in addition, there was a large population of enslaved Africans, as Spain had continued the transatlantic slave trade. This was particularly true in the area of the present-day state of Louisiana, which also contained a large number of free people of color. Both present-day Arkansas and Missouri already had some slaveholders in the 18th and early 19th century.

During this period, south Louisiana received a large influx of French-speaking refugees fleeing the Haitian Revolution in Saint-Domingue, including planters who brought their slaves with them. Many Southern slaveholders feared that acquisition of the new territory might inspire American-held slaves to follow the example of those in Saint-Domingue and revolt. They wanted the U.S. government to establish laws allowing slavery in the newly acquired territory so they could be supported in taking their slaves there to undertake new agricultural enterprises, as well as to reduce the threat of future slave rebellions. The Louisiana Territory was broken into smaller territories for administration.

The territories passed slavery laws similar to those in the southern states but incorporating provisions from the preceding French and Spanish rule (for instance, Spain had prohibited slavery of Native Americans in 1769, but some slaves of mixed African–Native American descent were still being held in St. Louis in Upper Louisiana when the U.S. took over). In a freedom suit that went from Missouri to the U.S. Supreme Court, slavery of Native Americans was finally ended in 1836. The institutionalization of slavery under U.S. law in the Louisiana Territory contributed to the American Civil War a half century later.

As states organized within the territory, the status of slavery in each state became a matter of contention in Congress, as southern states wanted slavery extended to the west, and northern states just as strongly opposed new states being admitted as "slave states". The Missouri Compromise of 1820 was a temporary solution.

== Asserting U.S. possession ==
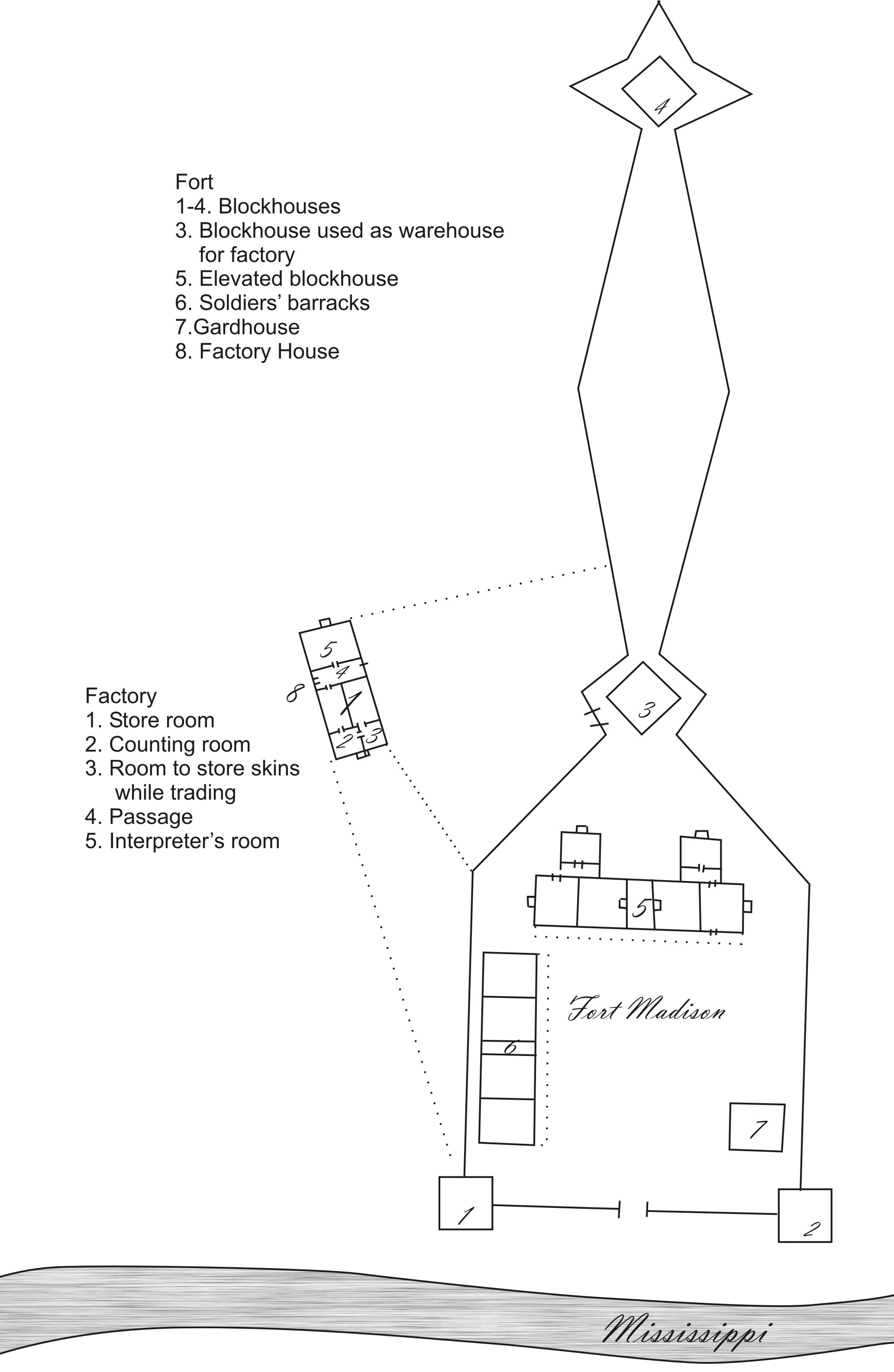
Plan of Fort Madison, built in 1808 to establish U.S. control over the northern part of the Louisiana Purchase, drawn 1810

After the early explorations, the U.S. government sought to establish control of the region, since trade along the Mississippi and Missouri rivers was still dominated by British and French traders from Canada and allied Indians, especially the Sauk and Fox. The U.S. adapted the former Spanish facility at Fort Bellefontaine as a fur trading post near St. Louis in 1804 for business with the Sauk and Fox. In 1808, two military forts with trading factories were built, Fort Osage along the Missouri River in western present-day Missouri and Fort Madison along the Upper Mississippi River in eastern present-day Iowa. With tensions increasing with Great Britain, in 1809 Fort Bellefontaine was converted to a U.S. military fort and was used for that purpose until 1826.

During the War of 1812, aided by their Indian allies, the British defeated U.S. forces in the Upper Mississippi; the U.S. abandoned Forts Osage and Madison, as well as several other U.S. forts built during the war, including Fort Johnson and Fort Shelby. U.S. ownership of the whole Louisiana Purchase region was confirmed in the Treaty of Ghent (ratified in February 1815). The U.S. later built or expanded forts along the Mississippi and Missouri rivers, including adding to Fort Bellefontaine, and constructing Fort Armstrong (1816) and Fort Edwards (1816) in Illinois, Fort Crawford (1816) in Wisconsin, Fort Snelling (1819) in Minnesota, and Fort Atkinson (1819) in Nebraska.

== Impact on Native Americans ==
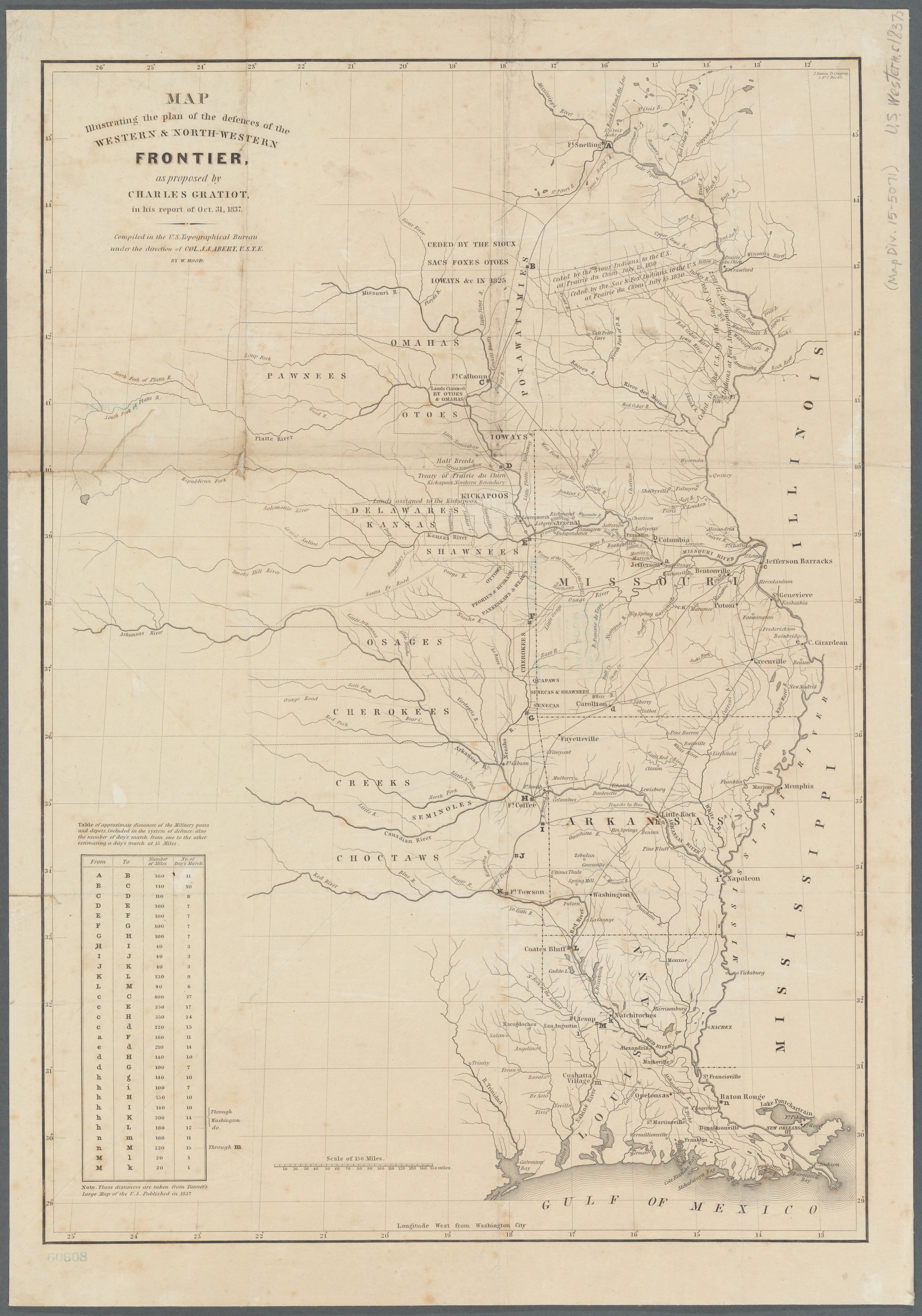
Louisiana Purchase territory shown as American Indian land in Gratiot's map of the defenses of the western & north-western frontier, 1837

The Louisiana Purchase was negotiated between France and the United States, without consulting the various Indian tribes who lived on the land and who had not ceded the land to any colonial power. The four decades following the Louisiana Purchase was an era of court decisions removing many tribes from their lands east of the Mississippi for resettlement in the new territory, culminating in the Trail of Tears.

The purchase of the Louisiana Territory led to debates over the idea of indigenous land rights that persisted into the mid 20th century. The many court cases and tribal suits in the 1930s for historical damages flowing from the Louisiana Purchase led to the Indian Claims Commission Act (ICCA) in 1946. Felix S. Cohen, Interior Department lawyer who helped pass ICCA, is often quoted as saying, "practically all of the real estate acquired by the United States since 1776 was purchased not from Napoleon or any other emperor or czar but from its original Indian owners".

In 2017, the total cost to the U.S. government of all subsequent treaties and financial settlements up to the year 2012 for the land acquired in the Louisiana Purchase was estimated to be around $2.6 billion, or $11.4 billion in 2024 dollars. This is equivalent to $418 million in 1803 dollars, so the $15 million originally paid to France was roughly 3.5 percent of the total amount paid for this land, to both France and the Indians.

== See also ==
- Corps of Discovery
- Florida Purchase
- Foreign affairs of the Jefferson administration
- Franco-American alliance
- Historic regions of the United States
- List of French possessions and colonies
- Louisiana Purchase Historic State Park
- Territorial evolution of the United States
- Territories of the United States on stamps
- Lewis and Clark National Historic Trail
- New France

== Works cited ==
- Adams, Henry (2011) [1889]. History of the United States of America (1801–1817). Vol. 2: During the First Administration of Thomas Jefferson. Cambridge University Press. ISBN 978-1108033039.
- Banning, Lance (1995). The Sacred Fire of Liberty: James Madison and the Founding of the Federal Republic. Ithaca: Cornell University Press. ISBN 9780801431524.
- Burgan, Michael (2002). The Louisiana Purchase. Capstone. ISBN 978-0756502102.
- Carr, James A. "The Battle of New Orleans and the Treaty of Ghent." Diplomatic History 3.3 (1979): 273–282. doi.org/10.1111/j.1467-7709.1979.tb00315.x
- Cerami, Charles A. (2003). Jefferson's Great Gamble. Sourcebooks. ISBN 978-1402234354.
- Duke, Marc (1977). The du Ponts: Portrait of a Dynasty. Saturday Review Press. ISBN 0-8415-0429-6.
- Fleming, Thomas J. (2003). The Louisiana Purchase. John Wiley & Sons. ISBN 978-0-471-26738-6.
- Gayarre, Charles (1867). History of Louisiana.
- Hämäläinen, Pekka (2008). The Comanche Empire. Yale University Press. ISBN 978-0-300-12654-9.
- Haynes, Robert V. (2010). The Mississippi Territory and the Southwest Frontier, 1795–1817. University Press of Kentucky. ISBN 978-0-8131-2577-0.
- Herring, George (2008). From Colony to Superpower: U.S. Foreign Relations Since 1776. Oxford University Press. ISBN 978-0-19-976553-9., pp. 101–109.
- Ketcham, Ralph (2003). James Madison: A Biography. Newtown CT: American Political Biography Press. ISBN 978-0813912653.
- Kennedy, David M.; Cohen, Lizabeth & Bailey, Thomas Andrew (2008). The American Pageant: A History of the American People. Wadsworth. ISBN 978-0-547-16654-4.
- Lawson, Gary & Seidman, Guy (2008). The Constitution of Empire: Territorial Expansion and American Legal History. Yale University Press. ISBN 978-0300128963.
- Lewis, James E. Jr. (2003). The Louisiana Purchase: Jefferson's Noble Bargain?. UNC Press Books.
- Luttig, John C. (1920). Journal of a Fur-trading Expedition on the Upper Missouri: 1812–1813. Kansas City MO: The Missouri Historical Society.
- Malone, Michael P.; Roeder, Richard B. & Lang, William L. (1991). Montana: A History of Two Centuries. Seattle: University of Washington Press. ISBN 0-295-97129-0.
- Matthewson, Tim (May 1995). "Jefferson and Haiti". The Journal of Southern History. 61 (2): 209–48. doi:10.2307/2211576. JSTOR 2211576.
- Matthewson, Tim (March 1996). "Jefferson and the Non-Recognition of Haiti". Proceedings of the American Philosophical Society. 140 (1): 22–48. JSTOR 987274.
- Meinig, D.W. (1995). The Shaping of America: Volume 2. Yale University Press. ISBN 978-0300062908.
- Nugent, Walter (2009). Habits of Empire: A History of American Expansionism. Random House. ISBN 978-1-4000-7818-9.
- Prucha, Francis P. (1969). The Sword of the Republic: The United States Army on the Frontier 1783–1846. New York: Macmillan.
- Rodriguez, Junius P. (2002). The Louisiana Purchase: A Historical and Geographical Encyclopedia. ABC-CLIO. ISBN 978-1576071885.
- Schoultz, Lars (1998). Beneath the United States. Harvard University Press. ISBN 978-0-674-92276-1.
- Thompson, Linda (2006). The Louisiana Purchase. Rourke Publishing. ISBN 978-1-59515-513-9.
- Weber, David J. (1994). The Spanish Frontier in North America. Yale University Press. ISBN 978-0-300-05917-5.
- Ziegler, Philip (1988). The Sixth Great Power: Barings 1762–1929. London: Collins. ISBN 0-00-217508-8.
