= Robert C. Dunbar =

American football player and coach (1878–1973)

Biographical details
- Born: May 6, 1878; Monmouth, Illinois, U.S.
- Died: June 22, 1973 (aged 95); Louisville, Kentucky, U.S.
- Education: Monmouth (IL) (1899)

Playing career
- 1898: Monmouth (IL)

Coaching career (HC unless noted)
- 1898: Monmouth (IL)

Robert Clayton Dunbar (May 6, 1878 – June 22, 1973) was an American college football player and coach. He served as the head football coach at Monmouth College in Monmouth, Illinois, where he was also a player and a student. Upon graduation, he attended Cornell University in Ithaca, New York.
