= Dunbar baronets of Durn (1698) =

The Dunbar baronetcy, of Durn, was created for William Dunbar of Durne Fordyce, Banffshire, on 29 January 1698.

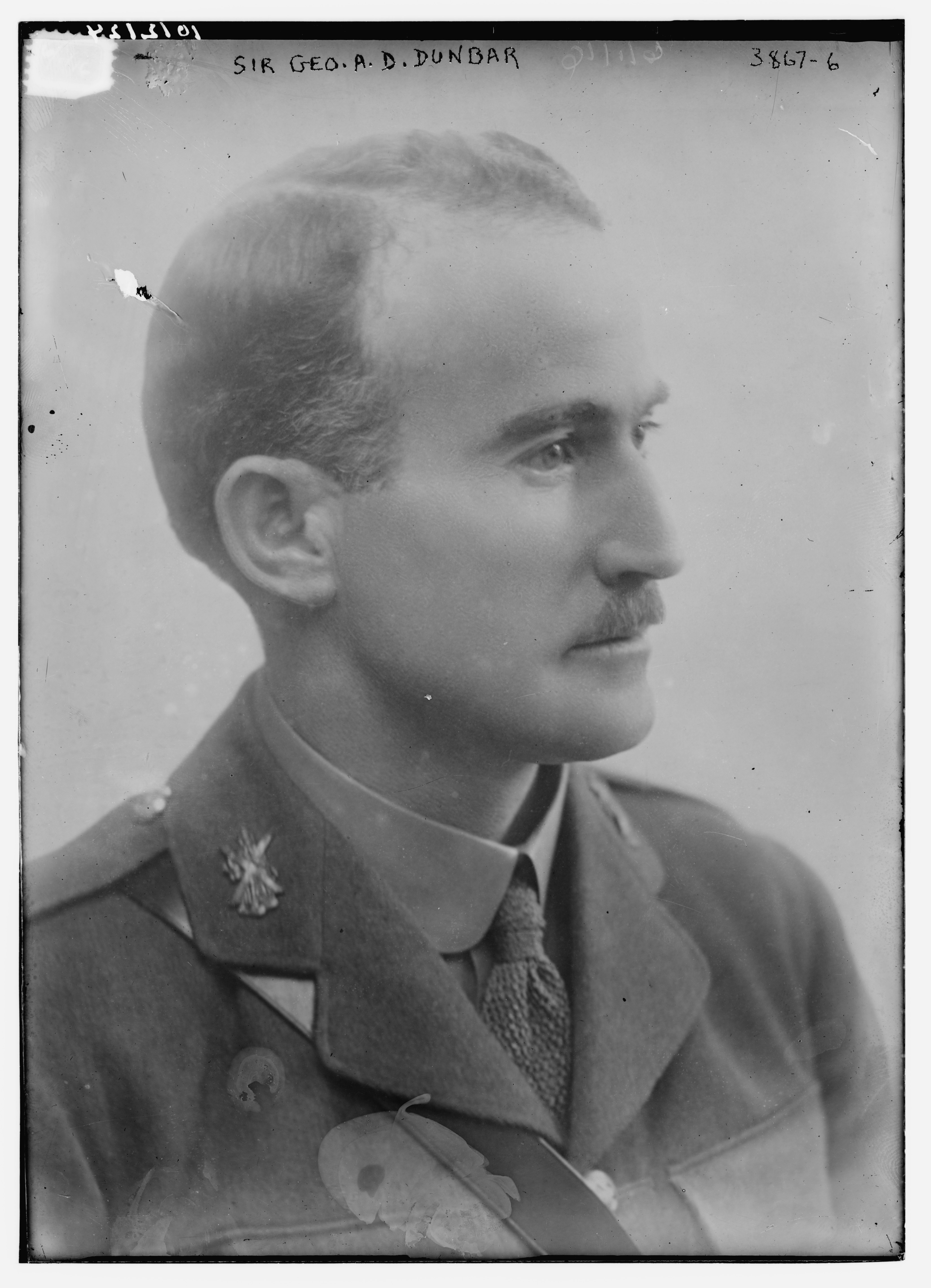
Sir George Alexander Drummond Dunbar

== Dunbar baronets of Durn (1698) ==
- Sir William Dunbar, 1st Baronet (died c. 1710)
- Sir James Dunbar, 2nd Baronet (1668–1737)
- Sir William Dunbar, 3rd Baronet (died 1786)
- Sir James Dunbar, 4th Baronet (died 1812)
- Sir Robert Dunbar, 5th Baronet (1780–1813)
- Sir William Dunbar, 6th Baronet (1804–1881)
- Sir Drummond Miles Dunbar, 7th Baronet (1845–1903)
- Sir George Alexander Drummond Dunbar, 8th Baronet (1879–1949)
- Sir Drummond Cospatrick Ninian Dunbar, 9th Baronet (1917–2000)
- Sir Robert Drummond Cospatrick Dunbar, 10th Baronet (born 1958). His son, Alexander William Drummond Dunbar (born 1995), is the heir apparent.
