= Vet Dunbar =

American baseball player

- Catcher

Negro league baseball debut
- 1937, for the Indianapolis Athletics

Last appearance
- 1937, for the Memphis Red Sox

Teams
- Indianapolis Athletics (1937); Memphis Red Sox (1937)

Johnny Dunbar, nicknamed "Vet", is an American former Negro league catcher who played in the 1930s.

Dunbar played for the Indianapolis Athletics and the Memphis Red Sox in 1937. In 15 recorded games, he posted 16 hits with two home runs and 13 RBI in 52 plate appearances.
