= East Dunbar, Fort Myers, Florida =

East Dunbar, Florida
- Neighborhood
- Location in Lee County and the state of Florida
- Coordinates: 26°38′0″N 81°50′36″W
- Country: United States
- State: Florida
- County: Lee
- City: Fort Myers

Area
  - Total: 0.81 sq mi (2.1 km^{2})
  - Land: 0.81 sq mi (2.1 km^{2})
  - Water: 0 sq mi (0 km^{2})

Population (2000)
  - Total: 1,935
  - Density: 2,386/sq mi (921.4/km^{2})
- Time zone: UTC-5 (Eastern (EST))
  - Summer (DST): UTC-4 (EDT)
- FIPS code: 12-19055

East Dunbar is a former census-designated place (CDP) in Lee County, Florida, United States. The population was 1,935 at the 2000 census. The area has been annexed by the city of Fort Myers and is part of the Cape Coral-Fort Myers, Florida Metropolitan Statistical Area.

== Geography ==
East Dunbar is located at 26°38′0″N 81°50′36″W (26.633400, -81.843207). According to the United States Census Bureau, the CDP has a total area of 0.8 square miles (2.1 km^{2}), of which 0.8 square miles (2.1 km^{2}) is land and 1.23% is water.

== Demographics ==
East Dunbar CDP, Fort Myers, Florida – Racial and ethnic composition Note: the US Census treats Hispanic/Latino as an ethnic category. This table excludes Latinos from the racial categories and assigns them to a separate category. Hispanics/Latinos may be of any race.
Race / Ethnicity (NH = Non-Hispanic)	Pop 2000	% 2000
White alone (NH)	54	2.79%
Black or African American alone (NH)	1,771	91.52%
Native American or Alaska Native alone (NH)	7	0.36%
Asian alone (NH)	1	0.05%
Native Hawaiian or Pacific Islander alone (NH)	0	0.00%
Other race alone (NH)	0	0.00%
Mixed race or Multiracial (NH)	23	1.19%
Hispanic or Latino (any race)	79	4.08%
Total	1,935	100.00%

As of the census of 2000, there were 1,935 people, 627 households, and 432 families residing in the CDP. The population density was 2,427.3 inhabitants per square mile (937.2/km^{2}). There were 710 housing units at an average density of 890.6 per square mile (343.9/km^{2}). The racial makeup of the CDP was 3.67% White, 91.99% African American, 0.41% Native American, 0.05% Asian, 2.38% from other races, and 1.50% from two or more races. Hispanic or Latino of any race were 4.08% of the population.

There were 627 households, out of which 30.1% had children under the age of 18 living with them, 31.9% were married couples living together, 30.0% had a female householder with no husband present, and 31.1% were non-families. 23.6% of all households were made up of individuals, and 10.0% had someone living alone who was 65 years of age or older. The average household size was 2.98 and the average family size was 3.61.

In the CDP, the population was spread out, with 31.6% under the age of 18, 10.0% from 18 to 24, 23.3% from 25 to 44, 22.8% from 45 to 64, and 12.4% who were 65 years of age or older. The median age was 34 years. For every 100 females, there were 93.1 males. For every 100 females age 18 and over, there were 83.4 males.

The median income for a household in the CDP was $22,941, and the median income for a family was $25,809. Males had a median income of $24,688 versus $23,859 for females. The per capita income for the CDP was $9,567. About 30.4% of families and 37.3% of the population were below the poverty line, including 44.5% of those under age 18 and 46.2% of those age 65 or over.
