= John Greig Dunbar =

Scottish businessman and politician (1906-1978)

- Born: Edinburgh
- Occupations: Businessman; Politician
- Children: Greig Dunbar

Sir John Greig Dunbar, DL, JP (19 September 1906 – 4 January 1978) was a Scottish businessman and Conservative politician who served as Lord Provost of Edinburgh from 1960 to 1963.

== Life ==
Dunbar was born at Elgin House near the top of Easter Road in north-east Edinburgh, the son of James Dunbar. The lemonade company his father owned had relocated from Maryfield/East Norton Place to Albion Road around 1900. The firm made fruit squashes (including a drink from the kola nut), ginger beer and sodas.

Dunbar was joint Director and owner (with his brother Dr Alexander Dunbar) of James Dunbar Ltd. His cousins owned the parallel company of Dunbar and Co. on the Pleasance. The factory gave its name to the "Dunbar End" at Easter Road Stadium.

Dunbar became councillor for the Calton ward in the 1950s. He was elected Lord Provost of Edinburgh in 1960 in succession to Ian Anderson Johnson-Gilbert.

Dunbar was knighted by Queen Elizabeth II in the 1962 New Year Honours List. He was host to both the Queen and King Olav V of Norway during his time as Lord Provost. His time as Lord Provost was dominated by major planning decisions (typical of all cities at that time), including the decision to clear St James Square to create the St. James Centre and promotion of the Princes Street Plan which resulted in the loss of many important historic buildings.

Dunbar was succeeded as Lord Provost by Duncan Weatherstone in 1963.

== Family ==
His son was named Greig Dunbar.

== Death ==
John Greig Dunbar died on 4 January 1978, at the age of 71.

== Artistic recognition ==
Dunbar was portrayed in his ceremonial robes by David Donaldson in 1963. The portrait is held by Edinburgh City Art Centre but is rarely displayed.
