= Donald Dunbar =

American poet

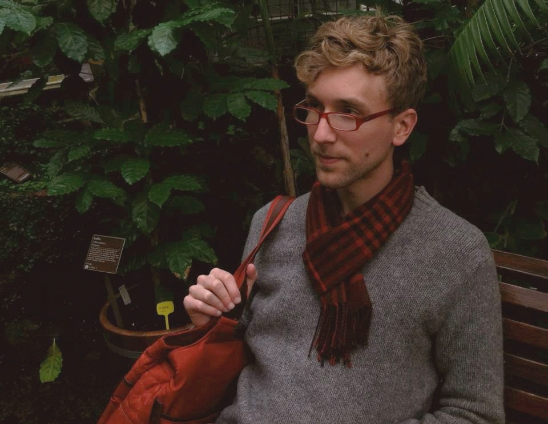
Donald Dunbar, 2013

Donald Dunbar (born 1983) is an American poet. He was raised in Ann Arbor, Michigan and earned his undergraduate degree at the University of Wisconsin, Madison. After completing his MFA in Poetry at the University of Arizona in Tucson, Dunbar lived alone at a cabin in the Upper Peninsula of Michigan and travelled through Western Europe, living in Germany and Portugal. He now lives in Portland, Oregon where he co-curates the reading series If Not For Kidnap and teaches at the Oregon Culinary Institute.

His collection "Eyelid Lick" was awarded the Fence Modern Poets Series Prize, and has been described as "being like given a driving tour through someone’s dream, and the dream is continually re-centering and referring back to itself," and "borne out of individual psychedelic experience into a world of streaming communication." Huffington Post called it "ripping good book that's nearly impossible to put down or forget" while conceding it would appeal most to users of psychedelic drugs.

== Early life and education ==
He was raised in the American Midwest and studied for an MFA at University of Arizona.

== Works ==
=== Books ===
- Safe Word (Gramma Poetry, 2017)
- Eyelid Lick (Fence Books, 2012)

=== Poems and Broadsides ===
- "Berlitz" (Black Lemon, 2012)
- Untitled Poem (PEN America, 2012)
- from Eyelid Lick (Octopus Magazine, 2013)
- Click Click (Gold Wake Press, 2010)
- You Are So Pretty (Scantily Clad Press, 2009)
