= Dunbar (ship) =

Dunbar is the name of the following ships:

- Dunbar (1853 ship), wrecked near Sydney Heads, Australia, 1857
- English ship Dunbar, a 64-gun ship of the line launched 1656, later HMS Henry

== See also ==
- Duncan Dunbar (ship), a clipper launched 1857, wrecked 1865
- Dunbar (disambiguation)
