= Dunbar baronets =

There have been five Dunbar baronetcies; the first four, which are extant, are in the Baronetage of Nova Scotia, and the last in the Baronetage of the United Kingdom.

- Dunbar baronets of Mochrum (1694)
- Dunbar baronets of Durn (1698)
- Dunbar baronets of Northfield (1700)
- Dunbar baronets of Hempriggs (1706)
- Dunbar baronets of Boath (1814)

== See also ==
- Hope-Dunbar baronets
