= Dunbar, Marlboro County, South Carolina =

Dunbar, South Carolina
- Unincorporated community
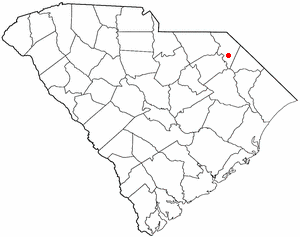
- Location of Dunbar, South Carolina
- Coordinates: 34.534°N 79.561°W
- Country: United States
- State: South Carolina
- County: Marlboro
- Elevation: 131 ft (40 m)
- Time zone: UTC-5 (Eastern (EST))
  - Summer (DST): UTC-4 (EDT)
- ZIP code: 29516
- Area codes: 843, 854
- GNIS feature ID: 1231245

Dunbar is an unincorporated community in Marlboro County, South Carolina, United States.

== Geography ==
Dunbar is located at latitude 35.534 and longitude –79.561. The elevation is 131 feet.
