= Sir George Duff-Sutherland-Dunbar, 6th Baronet =

British colonial officer and historian

Sir George Duff-Sutherland-Dunbar (29 May 1878 - 8 April 1962) was a British colonial officer and historian, notable for his 2-volume History of India, published in 1936. He also wrote adventure novels for children, one of which was serialised for radio by BBC in 1933. He was a member of the Dunbar of Hempriggs baronetage.

Dunbar was commissioned into the British army as a second lieutenant in the Cameron Highlanders on 3 August 1898, and was promoted to lieutenant on 1 April 1899. He served in the Indian Staff Corps from April 1899, and was formally transferred to the Indian Army in June 1902.

== Publications ==
Non-Fiction

- Frontiers (London: Nicholson & Watson, 1932)
- A History of India volume I & II (1936, reprinted 1995)
- A History of India volume II (1936, reprinted 1943)
- Other Men's Lives: A Study of Primitive Peoples (The Scientific Book Club, 1938)
- India and the Passing of Empire (London, Nicholson & Watson 1951)

Fiction for Children

- The Poisoned Arrow (pub date unknown but serialised on BBC Children's Hour in 1933)
- Jungbir - Secret Agent (London: Burns Oates & Washbourne, 1934)

Baronetage of Nova Scotia
Preceded by Benjamin Duff Dunbar	Baronet (of Hempriggs); 1897–1962	Succeeded by George Duff-Sutherland-Dunbar
