= Robin Hood (disambiguation) =

Robin Hood is an English folk hero and legendary outlaw.

Robin Hood or Robinhood may also refer to:

== Places ==
=== Australia ===
- Robin Hood, Drouin, Victoria
- Robin Hood Hotel, Adelaide

=== Canada ===
- Robinhood, Saskatchewan
- Robinhood Bay, Newfoundland

=== United Kingdom ===
- Doncaster Sheffield Airport, South Yorkshire, England, formerly known as Robin Hood Airport
- Robin Hood, one of the Crookdale Horseshoe group of hills in Cumbria, England
- Robin Hood, Derbyshire, a hamlet in Baslow and Bubnell parish, Derbyshire Dales
- Robin Hood, Lancashire, a settlement in Wrightington parish, West Lancashire
- Robin Hood, West Yorkshire, England
- Robin Hood Gardens, a residential estate in London, England
- Robin Hood Hills, Nottinghamshire, England

=== United States ===
- Robin Hood Hills, West Memphis, Arkansas, U.S.
- Robinhood, Mississippi, U.S.

== Arts and entertainment ==
=== Ballets ===
- Robin Hood (ballet), 1998, by Paul Vasterling
- Robin Hood, 1985, by Ilkka Kuusisto

=== Fictional characters ===
- Robin Hood (DC Comics), version of the character in DC Comics
- Robin Hood (Disney character), in the 1973 Disney film Robin Hood
- Robin Hood (Once Upon a Time), from the ABC television series Once Upon a Time

=== Films ===
- Robin Hood (1912 film), a silent film starring Robert Frazer
- Robin Hood (1922 film), a silent film starring Douglas Fairbanks
- The Adventures of Robin Hood (1938), a swashbuckler film starring Errol Flynn
- The Story of Robin Hood (film) (1952), a Disney live-action film starring Richard Todd
- Robin Hood (1973 film), a Disney animated film
- Robin Hood (1991 British film), a TV movie featuring Patrick Bergin and Uma Thurman
- Robin Hood: Prince of Thieves, a 1991 film starring Kevin Costner
- Robin Hood: Men in Tights (1993), a parody film directed by Mel Brooks
- Robin Hood (2009 film), an Indian Malayalam-language film starring Prithviraj
- Robin Hood (2010 film), directed by Ridley Scott and starring Russell Crowe and Cate Blanchett
- Robin Hood (2018 film), directed by Otto Bathurst and starring Taron Egerton and Jamie Foxx
- Robinhood (2025 film), an Indian Telugu-language film by Venky Kudumula
- The Death of Robin Hood, a 2026 film directed by Michael Sarnoski and starring by Hugh Jackman

=== Gaming ===
- Super Robin Hood, a 1986 platform game for 8-bit home computers that was remade for 16-bit home computers as Robin Hood: Legend Quest in 1993
- Robin Hood: Prince of Thieves (video game), a 1991 NES tie-in for the Kevin Costner film
- The Adventures of Robin Hood (video game)
- Robin Hood: The Legend of Sherwood, a 2002 strategy computer game developed by Spellbound Studios
- Robin Hood: Defender of the Crown, a 2003 video game made by Cinemaware and Capcom

=== Publications ===
- Robin Hood; His Deeds and Adventures as Recounted in the Old English Ballads, a 1906 book by Lucy Fitch Perkins
- Robin Hood, a 1912 novel by Henry Gilbert
- Robin Hood: The Prince of Outlaws, a 1937 novel by Carola Oman
- Robin Hood, a 1955 book by Enid Blyton in the Old Thatch series
- Robin Hood, a 1955 novel by Antonia Fraser
- Robin Hood: Prince of Thieves, a 1991 novel by Simon R. Green, a novelization of the film
- Robin Hood, a 1992 novel by A. L. Singer, a novelization of the 1973 film
- Robin Hood: The Boy Who Became a Legend, a 1999 novel by Kathryn Lasky
- Robin Hood, a 2005 novel by Narinder Dhami, a novelization of the 1973 film
- Robin Hood: Demon's Bane, a 2015–17 trilogy of novels by Debbie Viguié and James R. Tuck
- Robin Hood: The One Who Looked Good in Green, a 2018 novel by Wendy Mass
- Robin Hood, a 2020 young adult novel series by Robert Muchamore

=== Operas ===
- Robin Hood, a 1750 opera, music by Charles Burney (under the Temple of Apollo banner), libretto by Moses Mendez
- Robin Hood, a 1784 opera, music by William Shield, libretto by L. McNally and E. Lysaght
- Robin Hood, an 1860 opera, music by George Macfarren, libretto by John Oxenford
- Robin Hood (De Koven opera), composed by Reginald De Koven, lyrics by Harry B. Smith, and Clement Scott in 1888–1889
- Robin Hood (Tippett opera), a 1934 ballad opera by Michael Tippett
- Robin Hood, 2011, by Jukka Linkola

=== Television ===
==== Shows ====
- Robin Hood (1953 TV series), a BBC TV series starring Patrick Troughton
- Robin Hood (1990 TV series), a Japanese anime series that aired on NHK
- Robin Hood (2006 TV series), a BBC TV series starring Jonas Armstrong
- Robin Hood (2025 TV series)
- Robin of Sherwood (or Robin Hood), a 1980s British TV series created by Richard Carpenter

==== Episodes ====
- "Robin Hood", Ark II episode 9 (1976)
- "Robin Hood", Festival of Family Classics episode 10 (1972)
- "Robin Hood", Gunsmoke season 1, episode 17 (1956)
- "Robin Hood", Mel-O-Toons episode (1960)
- "Robin Hood", Mystery Files (British) season 1, episode 3 (2010)
- "Robin Hood", Numbers season 4, episode 5 (2007)
- "Robin Hood", Peabody's Improbable History episode 23 (1960)
- "Robin Hood", Upload season 2, episode 3 (2022)

=== Other arts and entertainment ===
- Robin Hood (album), the soundtrack to the Robin of Sherwood British TV series

== Brands and enterprises ==
- Robin Hood (bicycle company), an English manufacturer
- Robin Hood Aviation, a defunct Austrian airline
- Robin Hood Engineering, a British kit car manufacturer
- Robin Hood Energy, energy company owned by Nottingham City Council
- Robin Hood F.C., a Bermudan soccer club
- Robin Hood Flour, a Canadian flour brand owned by Cargill
- Robin Hood Foundation, a nonprofit charitable organization which attempts to alleviate problems caused by poverty in New York City
- S.V. Robinhood, a Surinamese football club
- Robinhood (company), a financial services company

== Other uses ==
- Robin Hood (golfer) (born 1964), American professional golfer
- Robin Hood (roller coaster), an attraction at Walibi Holland theme park
- Robin Hood (ship), a British tea clipper built in 1856
- Robin Hood (train), a British passenger train
- Robin Hood v. United States, a 2012 court case

== See also ==
- Cultural depictions of Robin Hood
- List of films and television series featuring Robin Hood
- Robin Hood and His Merry Men (disambiguation)
- Robin Hood: Prince of Thieves (disambiguation)
- The Adventures of Robin Hood (disambiguation)
- The Legend of Robin Hood (disambiguation)
- Robin Hood hat
- 2019 Baltimore ransomware attack, achieved using RobbinHood ransomware
- Robin Hood effect, the result in economics of an income redistribution scheme
- Robin Hood plan, the school funding system in Texas which "recaptures" tax money from "wealthy" school districts for redistribution to "poorer" ones
- Robin Hood tax, referring to a proposed tax on financial transactions
- Joaquin Murrieta (1829–1853), an historical figure in early California, known as "the Robin Hood of El Dorado"
- Tantia Bhīl (1840–1889), a 19th century Indian rebel described as an "Indian Robin Hood"
- Jagga Jatt (1901/1902–1932), a 20th century Sikh bandit known as "the Robin Hood of Punjab"
- Barry Greenstein (born 1954), American poker player known as "the Robin Hood of Poker"
- Anthony Hamilton (snooker player) (born 1971), English snooker player known as "the Robin Hood of Snooker"
- Robyn Hood, a 2023 Canadian TV series created by Director X
