= Hercules Linton =

British antiquarian (1837–1900)

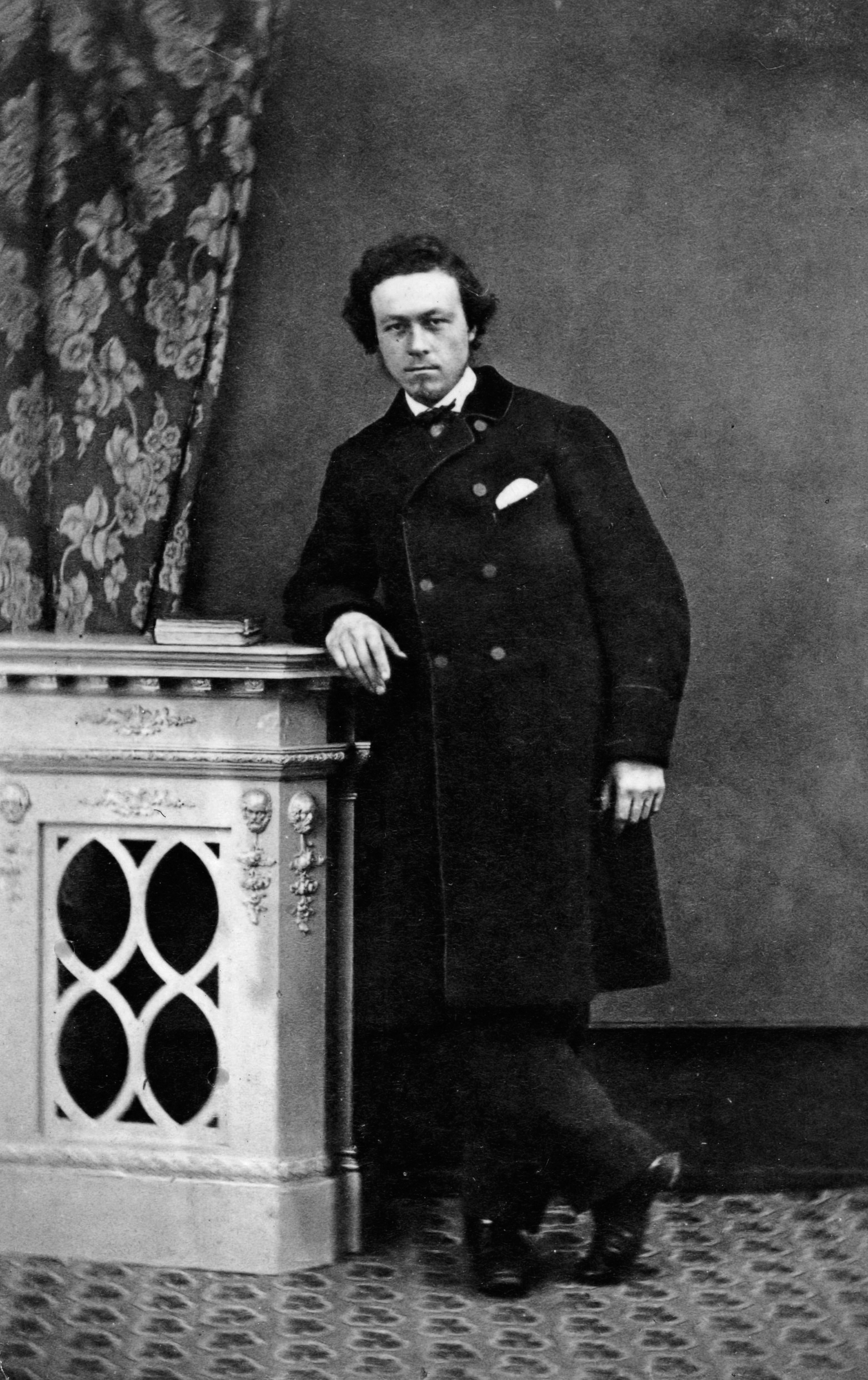
Hercules Linton

Hercules Linton (1 January 1837 – 15 May 1900) was a Scottish surveyor, designer, shipbuilder, antiquarian and local councillor, best known as the designer of the Cutty Sark and partner in the yard of Scott and Linton, which built her.

He was born in Inverbervie, Kincardineshire, Scotland. In 1855 on his nineteenth birthday, Hercules Linton was apprenticed to Alexander Hall and Sons, who were the leading shipbuilders in Aberdeen and whose schooner Scottish Maid (1839) with its sharp bow and entry helped coin the term Aberdeen Bow. Linton progressed through his apprenticeship and eventually rose to a senior position at Alexander Hall and Sons.

Eventually he left Alexander Hall and Sons to become a Lloyd's Register Surveyor based at the Lloyds offices in Liverpool. He subsequently moved to the Liverpool Underwriters Registry where from early in 1862 he was assisting John Jordan, the Chief Surveyor. It is thought that he left the Liverpool Underwriters Association in May 1864 but still associated on a freelance basis.

== Scott and Linton shipbuilders ==
In May 1868, Linton entered into a shipbuilding partnership with William Dundas Scott to form the firm of Scott & Linton, shipbuilders of Dumbarton, on the River Leven near its junction with the River Clyde.

Approximately £600 of the £1200 capital to set up the business was provided by Scott's father. The rest was a borrowing against Linton's life insurance policy and some cash. Hercules Linton managed the design and shipbuilding and William Scott managed the counting house and engineering.

In May 1868 Scott & Linton rented part of the Woodyard. The yard was previously occupied by Denny's until they moved across the river Leven upon expiry of their lease. However, the lack of business experience in the two partners showed as early as August. Correspondence between Scott and his father shows that cash flow problems emerged during the building of their first order, the small iron steamship Camel, for which there appeared to be no contracted stage payments during the build. Work had to be completed in October and the completed vessel delivered to J. Bibby & Co in Newcastle at which point Scott & Linton would then receive the full purchase price of £980.

=== Cutty Sark and John Willis ===
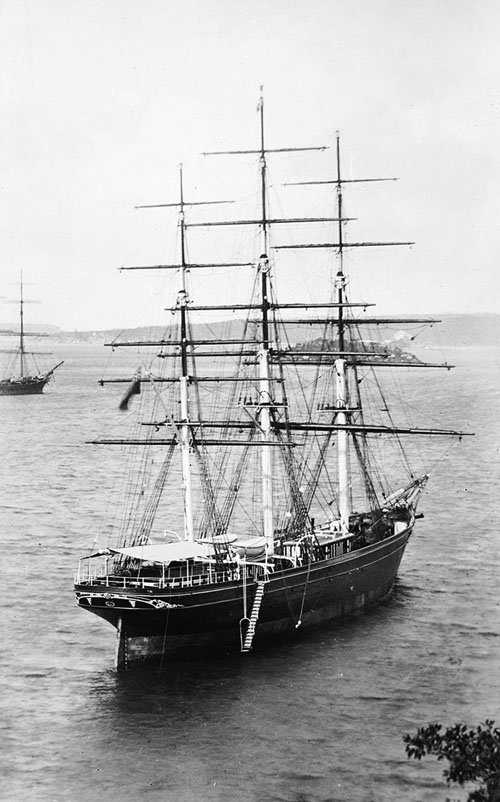
Cutty Sark

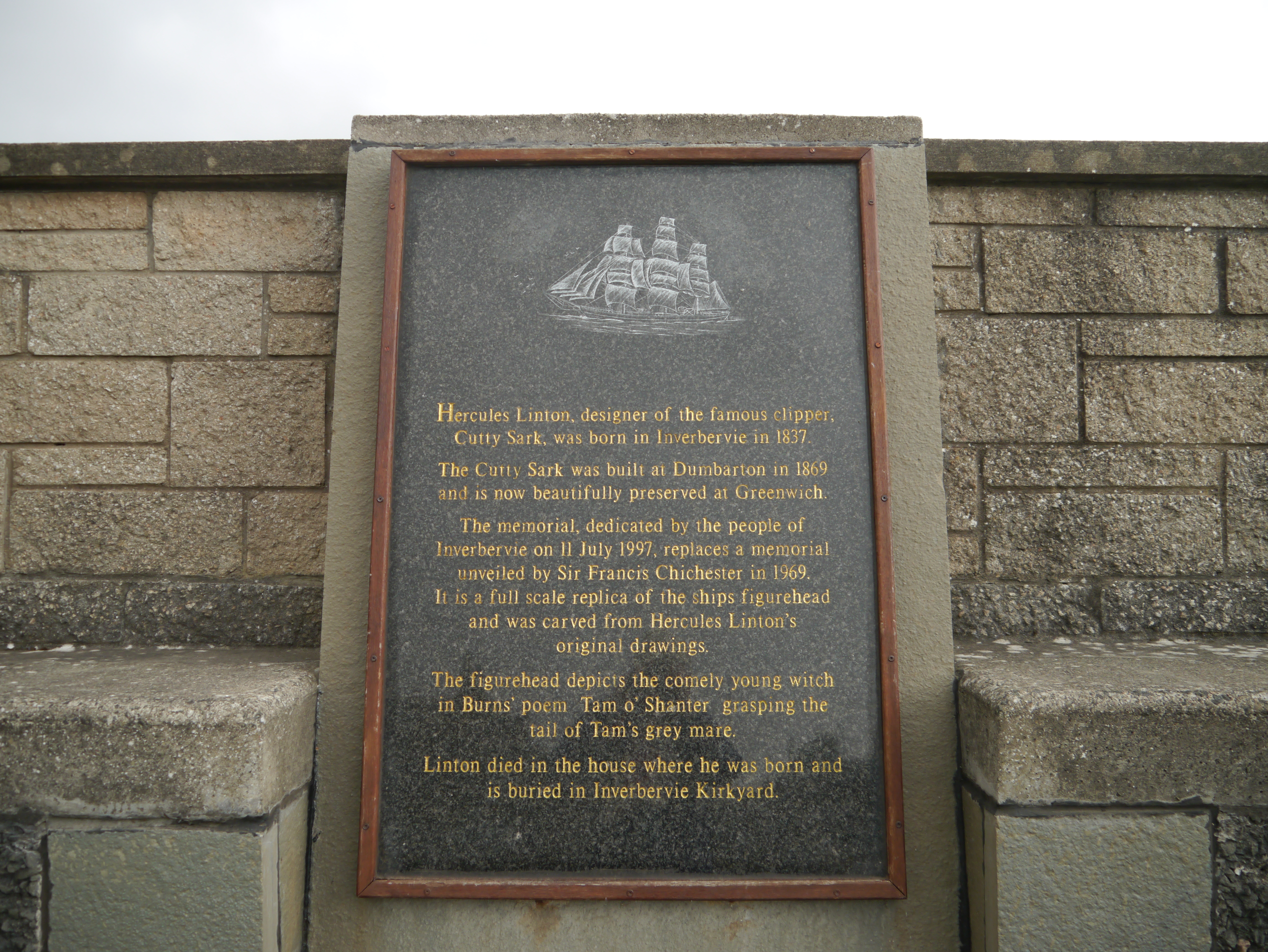
Memorial plaque in Inverbervie, featuring a short biography

The agreement to build the Cutty Sark was signed by John 'Jock' Willis (also known as 'White Hat' Willis) on 1 February 1869 with a contracted completion date six months later on 30 July 1869. Willis had been an experienced shipmaster in his father's business and now was also an experienced ship owner on his own account. How Willis found and selected Scott & Linton to design and build a state of the art extreme clipper is not known. Linton had multiple contacts made through his career as a respected surveyor and probably also did design work as surveyors often did at that time. Linton's experience gained at Alexander Hall & Sons probably contributed to his design skills.

On the surface it seems Willis must have been taking a risk but he used all his business experience to negotiate an agreement which provided a high degree of protection. Willis with his practical experience also approved the drawings and specifications. The agreement provided for a payment of a deposit to Scott & Linton upon signature followed by seven stage payments as the construction progressed. However, there were also penalty clauses.

Cutty Sark was contracted for at a price of £17 per ton but if the tonnage exceeded 950 tons there would be no extra payment. The price of £17 per ton was extremely competitive and given the total lack of experience in building a composite clipper ship of anything close to the size and complexity of Cutty Sark makes one wonder how the price was calculated to win the order and yet still make a profit. The completed vessel was to be delivered by 30 July 1869 with a penalty of £5 per day to be paid by Scott & Linton for every day of delay unless the delays were due to changes in specification or labour strikes. If Scott and Linton were unable to complete then Willis had the right to enter the yard and finish the work paying for materials out of the withheld stage payments.

Cutty Sark was to be built to Lloyd's A1 classification and in addition to the regular visits from the Lloyd's surveyors, Willis had one of his experienced skippers, Captain George Moodie, superintend the construction prior to taking command of Cutty Sark upon completion. Captain Moodie was said to be particular regarding the quality of the materials used in the construction and only accepted the best quality materials and workmanship which all added to the cost (this may have contributed to why the Cutty Sark is still in existence today).

During the construction the Lloyd's surveyors wanted additional strengthening around the bilges and other areas. Agreement was eventually reached with Lloyd's but not before causing a delay which in turn delayed the receipt of stage payments, affected cash flow and reduced the profit by causing Scott & Linton to absorb the extra cost of labour and materials to comply with the negotiated additions.

The problems with the surveyors were made worse by the fact that Linton's father Alexander Linton was one of the Lloyd's surveyors involved. He was normally based in Belfast but in May 1869 he was temporarily seconded to Glasgow due to the resident Lloyd's surveyor's involvement in a shipyard accident.

=== Financial problems ===
Cash flow problems were such that all work in the Scott & Linton yard was suspended in the first week of September. Rather than apply for the company to be liquidated, the creditors met and decided to complete some or all of the outstanding contracts and a financial agreement was reached with William Denny & Bros to complete the ships. Cutty Sark was eventually launched on 22 November 1869, nearly five months late, by Captain Moodie's wife. Cutty Sark was then moved to Denny's yard on the other side of the River Leven to have her masts installed and on 20 December towed down the River Clyde to Greenock to have a specialist firm install her running rigging.

In the midst of the collapse of his business, Linton's wife gave birth to a baby son in October 1869 but soon after Linton was forced to hand over his house to the creditors. After everything was finished and final costs taken into account, the creditors were owed even more money than the amount outstanding when they made the ill-advised decision to complete the three ships.

== Linton in later years ==
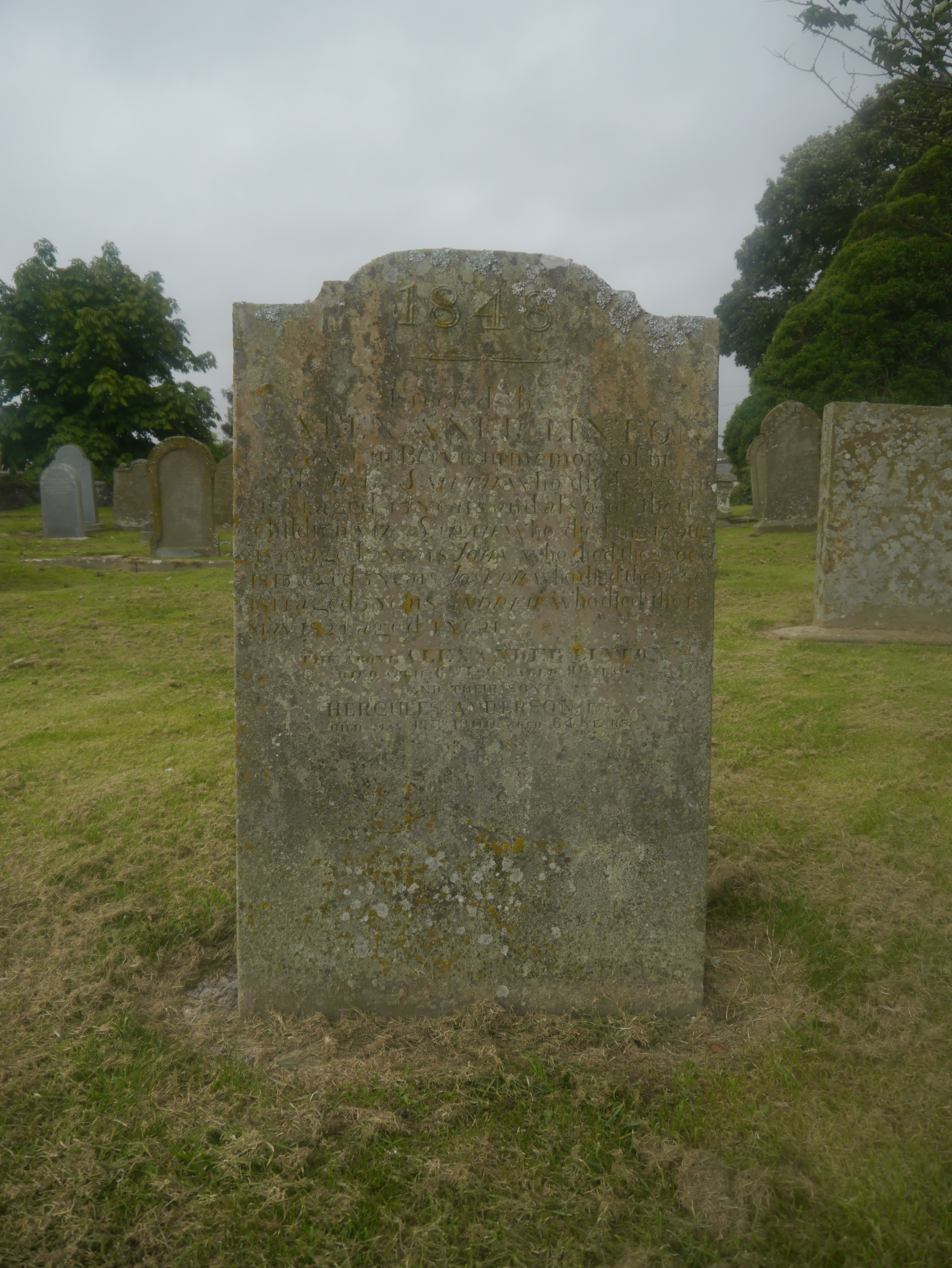
Linton's tombstone at the Inverbervie Kirkyard

After the troubles at Scott & Linton, Linton joined Gourlay Brothers as assistant manager at their yard in Camperdown, Dundee.

In December, 1869 Linton took a job as head of the modelling and design department at Leckie, Wood and Munro who were shipbuilders and engineers. At the beginning of April 1870 he resigned due to his involvement with a new firm of shipbuilders Morton, Wyld & Co. who started operations at the yard previously occupied by Scott & Linton. However, in November 1870 they also went bankrupt.

Linton was appointed a Fellow of the Society of Antiquaries of Scotland in November 1876.

He went south to Woolston, Hampshire in 1880 and eventually left to go to Montrose where his tenth and last child, a daughter was born in December 1884. Linton's wife Marjory died in January 1885 which affected him deeply.

In 1895 he was living in Inverbervie and in November of that year was elected to the Town Council.

Hercules Linton was aged 64 when he died on 15 May 1900 due to heart trouble. His grave in Inverbervie parish churchyard is extremely modest.

== Sources ==
- The Cutty Sark, Her Designer and Builder, HERCULES LINTON, 1836-1900. Author Robert E. Brettle. Published in 1969 by W. Heffer & Sons, Cambridge, England.
