= List of ships built by Hall, Russell & Company (1–200) =

List of ships built by Aberdeen shipbuilders Hall, Russell & Company, to yard number 200.

The ships built in the sequence to 200 cover the period 1868 to 1876.

The initial numbering began at 256, which was the numbering sequence used by Alexander Hall and Sons before switching to their own numbering sequence with the Inverness, the third ship built. Hall, Russell and Company initially built boilers and engines for ships, the second numbering sequence may follow on from that.

List of Hall, Russell & Company built ships (to 200)
Name	Image	Yard Number	Construction	Type	Year	Length Overall	Breadth	Depth	Tonnage	Ref(s)
Kwang Tung		256	Iron	Cargo Steamer	1868	220 feet (67 m)	31 feet (9.4 m)	14 feet (4.3 m)	492 long tons (500 t)	
Firefly		262	Iron	Yacht	1868	62 feet 2 inches (18.95 m)	13 feet (4.0 m)	7 feet (2.1 m)	Unknown	
Inverness	Inverness	168	Wood with Iron Frames	Cargo Steamer	1869	180 feet 5 inches (54.99 m)	32 feet 1 inch (9.78 m)	19 feet 1 inch (5.82 m)	722 long tons (734 t)	
Wun Yo Maru		169		Cargo Steamer	1870	126 feet 4 inches (38.51 m)	24 feet 7 inches (7.49 m)	10 feet (3.0 m)	239 long tons (243 t)	
Unknown		170		Sailing Barge	1870	49 feet 10 inches (15.19 m)	12 feet 1 inch (3.68 m)	5 feet 9 inches (1.75 m)		
James Hall		171		Cargo Steamer	1871	174 feet 5 inches (53.16 m)	24 feet 1 inch (7.34 m)	13 feet 3 inches (4.04 m)	366 long tons (372 t)	
Thomas Adam		172	Iron	Cargo Steamer	1870	201 feet 4 inches (61.37 m)	29 feet 2 inches (8.89 m)	16 feet 9 inches (5.11 m)	886 long tons (900 t)	
Unknown		173		Steam Yacht	1870	46 feet 1 inch (14.05 m)	9 feet 6 inches (2.90 m)	4 feet 6 inches (1.37 m)		
Emerald		174	Iron	Cargo Steamer	1871	170 feet 5 inches (51.94 m)	24 feet 1 inch (7.34 m)	12 feet 10 inches (3.91 m)	537 long tons (546 t)	
Aberdeen		175	Iron	Cargo Steamer	1871	230 feet 7 inches (70.28 m)	30 feet 1 inch (9.17 m)	17 feet 1 inch (5.21 m)	1,077 long tons (1,094 t)	
Unknown		176		Cargo Steamer (Paddle)	1871	100 feet 3 inches (30.56 m)	26 feet 1 inch (7.95 m)	5 feet (1.5 m)		
Bon-Accord		177	Iron	Cargo - Collier (Coal)	1871	170 feet 5 inches (51.94 m)	26 feet 1 inch (7.95 m)	14 feet (4.3 m)	469 long tons (477 t)	
Hai Loong		179	Iron	Cargo - Steamer	1871	155 feet 5 inches (47.37 m)	24 feet 1 inch (7.34 m)	9 feet 11 inches (3.02 m)	446 long tons (453 t)	
Lotus		180	Iron	Cargo - Steamer	1871	174 feet 3 inches (53.11 m)	25 feet (7.6 m)	19 feet 7 inches (5.97 m)	565 long tons (574 t)	
Benachie		181		Cargo - Steamer	1871	230 feet 7 inches (70.28 m)	30 feet 1 inch (9.17 m)	17 feet 1 inch (5.21 m)	1,065 long tons (1,082 t)	
Gassendi		182	Iron	Cargo - Steamer	1872	238 feet 7 inches (72.72 m)	30 feet 3 inches (9.22 m)	17 feet 1 inch (5.21 m)	1,249 long tons (1,269 t)	
Spray		183	Iron	Cargo - Steamer	1872	181 feet 1 inch (55.19 m)	28 feet (8.5 m)	14 feet 5 inches (4.39 m)	632 long tons (642 t)	
Namoa		184		Cargo Steamer	1872	240 feet 7 inches (73.33 m)	31 feet 1 inch (9.47 m)	17 feet 4 inches (5.28 m)	1,375 long tons (1,397 t)	
Douglas		185	Iron	Cargo Steamer	1872	240 feet 7 inches (73.33 m)	41 feet 1 inch (12.52 m)	21 feet (6.4 m)	1,373 long tons (1,395 t)	
Matin		186	Iron	Cargo Steamer	1873	175 feet 5 inches (53.47 m)	26 feet 1 inch (7.95 m)	14 feet 6 inches (4.42 m)	560 long tons (570 t)	
Thales		187	Iron	Cargo Steamer	1873	266 feet (81 m)	31 feet 1 inch (9.47 m)	17 feet 7 inches (5.36 m)	1,488 long tons (1,512 t)	
Gloamin		188		Cargo Steamer	1873	189 feet 6 inches (57.76 m)	26 feet 1 inch (7.95 m)	14 feet 6 inches (4.42 m)	607 long tons (617 t)	
Leonor		189	Iron	Cargo Steamer	1873	180 feet 5 inches (54.99 m)	27 feet 1 inch (8.26 m)	12 feet (3.7 m)	640 long tons (650 t)	
Ben Macdui		190		Cargo Steamer	1874	185 feet 6 inches (56.54 m)	26 feet 1 inch (7.95 m)	14 feet 6 inches (4.42 m)	592 long tons (601 t)	
Waratah		191		Cargo - Collier (Coal)	1874	160 feet 5 inches (48.90 m)	24 feet 1 inch (7.34 m)	13 feet (4.0 m)	425 long tons (432 t)	
Archimedes		192	Iron	Cargo Steamer	1874	271 feet (83 m)	32 feet 1 inch (9.78 m)	17 feet 7 inches (5.36 m)	1,520 long tons (1,540 t)	
Duncan		193		Cargo Steamer	1874	189 feet 6 inches (57.76 m)	26 feet 1 inch (7.95 m)	14 feet 6 inches (4.42 m)	627 long tons (637 t)	
Esmeralda		194		Cargo Steamer	1874	185 feet 6 inches (56.54 m)	26 feet 1 inch (7.95 m)	12 feet 2 inches (3.71 m)	638 long tons (648 t)	
Ben Avon		195	Iron	Cargo Steamer	1875	189 feet 9 inches (57.84 m)	26 feet 2 inches (7.98 m)	14 feet 4 inches (4.37 m)	632 long tons (642 t)	
Braemar		196		Cargo Steamer	1875	200 feet 6 inches (61.11 m)	27 feet 1 inch (8.26 m)	15 feet 6 inches (4.72 m)	725 long tons (737 t)	
Merlin		197	Iron	Cargo Steamer	1875	189 feet 6 inches (57.76 m)	26 feet 1 inch (7.95 m)	14 feet 6 inches (4.42 m)	643 long tons (653 t)	
Firefly		198	Wood	Yacht (Steam)	1875	55 feet 4 inches (16.87 m)	10 feet 4 inches (3.15 m)	5 feet 2 inches (1.57 m)	30 long tons (30 t)	
Ballater		199	Iron Screw	Cargo Steamer	1876	200 feet 6 inches (61.11 m)	27 feet 1 inch (8.26 m)	15 feet 6 inches (4.72 m)	780 long tons (790 t)	
Ferrifer		200	Iron Screw	Cargo Steamer	1876	85 feet 3 inches (25.98 m)	17 feet 7 inches (5.36 m)	8 feet 6 inches (2.59 m)	84 long tons (85 t)	

== Notes ==
- Where available, vessel measurements taken from Lloyd's Register, giving registered length, beam and draft. Hall, Russell and Company's own measurements typically are length overall, beam and moulded depth.
