= Mies =

Mies may refer to:

== People ==
- Ludwig Mies van der Rohe (1886–1969), German-American architect
- Maria Mies (1931–2023), German feminist
- Richard W. Mies (born 1944), U.S. Navy admiral and fourth commander in chief of the United States Strategic Command
- Mies Boissevain-van Lennep (1896–1965), member of the World War II Dutch resistance
- Andreas Mies (born 1990), German tennis player

== Places ==
- Mies, Switzerland, a municipality
- the German name for Mežica in Slovenia
- the German name for Stříbro in Czechia
- the German name for the Mže river in Czechia and Germany

== Ships ==
- HNLMS Mies, a Dutch Navy tugboat in service 1946–47
- ST Mies, Dutch East Indian tugboat in service 1947–53 and an Indonesian tugboat in service 1958–83
- KRI Mies, an Indonesian Navy tugboat in service 1953–58

== Other ==
- Battle of Tachov or Battle of Mies, fought in Bohemia in 1427 as part of the Hussite Wars

== See also ==
- Jacob of Mies (1372–1429), Bohemian reformer
- Mie (disambiguation)
