= 三重 =

三重 may refer to:

- Mie (disambiguation) § Places
- Sanchong District, a district in New Taipei City, Taiwan
- Sanchong metro station, a station of the Zhonghe–Xinlu line located in Sanchong District, New Taipei, Taiwan

== See also ==
- The dictionary definition of 三 at Wiktionary
- The dictionary definition of 重 at Wiktionary
