= HMAS Tingira =

1866 training ship

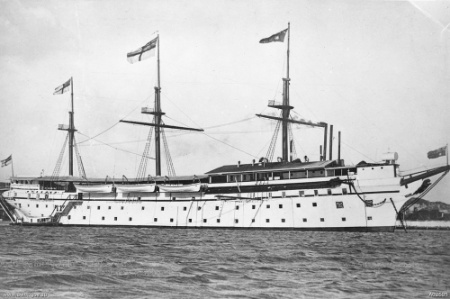
- HMAS Tingira moored in Rose Bay, Sydney in 1912

History

United Kingdom
- Name: Sobraon
- Namesake: Battle of Sobraon
- Owner: Shaw, Lowther, Maxton & Co. (1866-1870)
- Operator: Devitt and Moore (1866-1891, also became owner from 1870 onwards)
- Route: London to Sydney (1866-1871); London to Melbourne (1871-1891)
- Builder: Alexander Hall & Co.
- Yard number: 239
- Launched: 17 April 1866
- Maiden voyage: 9 November 1866 to 4 February 1867
- Out of service: January 1891
- Identification: Official Number 54680
- Fate: Sold to Government of New South Wales in 1891, sold to Australian federal government in 1911

Australia
- Name: Tingira
- Acquired: 1911
- Commissioned: 25 April 1912
- Decommissioned: 30 June 1927
- Fate: Broken up in 1941

General characteristics
- Tonnage: 2,131 GRT
- Length: 317 ft (97 m) overall; 272 ft (83 m) between perpendiculars
- Beam: 40 ft (12 m)
- Draught: 16 ft (4.9 m) mean
- Depth of hold: 27 feet (8.2 m)
- Sail plan: 2 acres (0.81 ha) sail area
- Speed: Up to 16 knots (30 km/h; 18 mph)
- Capacity: 90 first class and 40 second class passengers (as Sobraon); 250 trainees (as Tingira)
- Crew: 69 (as Sobraon)

HMAS Tingira was a training ship operated by the Royal Australian Navy (RAN) between 1911 and 1927. Alexander Hall & Co. built the ship in Scotland in 1866 as the passenger clipper Sobraon; she was the largest composite-hull sailing vessel ever built. She sailed on an annual migration run between England and Australia until 1891, when she was sold to the colonial government of New South Wales for use as a reformatory ship. The vessel was then sold to the federal government in 1911, and entered RAN service. Tingira was paid off in 1927, but despite efforts to preserve the ship, was broken up in 1941.

== Design and construction ==
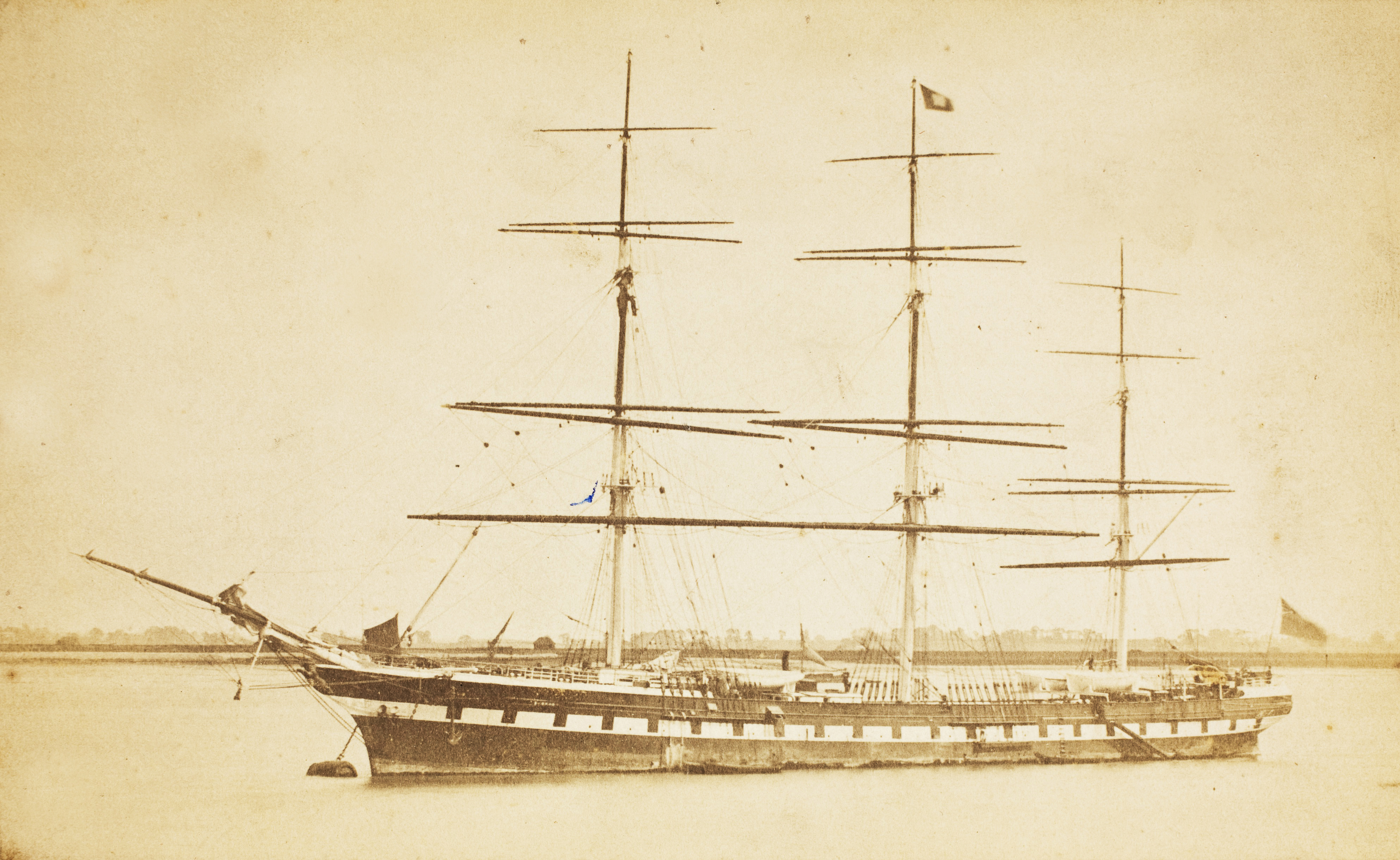
Clipper ship Sobraon, Gravesend, England, ca. 1875

Sobraon was designed as a combination steam-sail ship, but plans to integrate a steam-powered propulsion system were cancelled while the ship was being built. Under full sail, Sobraon could use up to 2 acres (0.81 ha) of sail, and could achieve 16 knots (30 km/h; 18 mph). The ship's hold was 27 feet (8.2 m), and there was provision for livestock. The hull was of composite construction - teak planking over an iron frame. Sobraon was the largest composite-hull sailing vessel ever built. (Note: The Aberdeen Journal compared Sobraon with the ship Schomberg, from the same builder in 1855. The latter was length 288 feet, breadth 45 feet, depth of hold 29 feet; 2400 register tons (the measurement system changed and under the old system was 2600 tons), burthen 3000-4000 tons; but she was not a composite vessel.)

Allexander Hall & Sons built Sobraon at Aberdeen, Scotland. She was given the yard number 239. The ship, named after the Battle of Sobraon, was launched on 17 April 1866.

== Operational history ==
=== Sobraon ===
The ship was built for Shaw, Lowther, Maxton & Co., but was initially operated by the firm Devitt and Moore, who purchased the vessel in 1870. Sobraon was used on the England to Australia migration route, and made one trip per year from England. Her maiden voyage departed London on 9 November and Plymouth 21 November 1866, reaching Australia on 4 February 1867. Initially, voyages ended in Sydney, but from 1872 onwards, Sobraon began sailing to Melbourne instead. The ship's high speed, along with onboard facilities like a water condenser, 3-tonne (3.0-long-ton; 3.3-short-ton) ice chamber, and fresh milk daily from onboard livestock, made Sobraon one of the more popular migration ships. On the first three return voyages, Sobraon would take on a cargo of Indian tea and race other ships back to England to deliver the first cargo. After the third voyage, the ship was instead loaded with cargoes of Australian wheat and wool for the return leg.

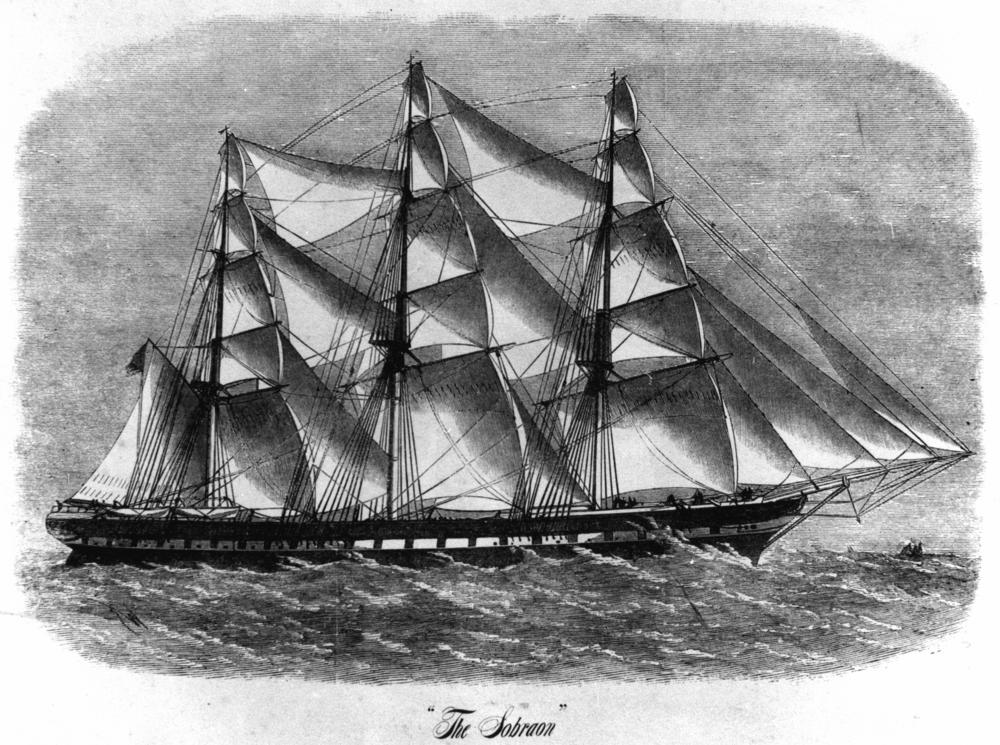
Sobraon in her original configuration as a passenger clipper

On 14 October 1890, Sobraon sailed on her final voyage to Australia. She reached Melbourne on 4 January 1891, was sold later that month to the New South Wales Government, then towed to Sydney. In the hands of the colony's government, Sobraon was assigned to the State Welfare Department and refitted for use as a reformatory ship, where delinquent boys were trained in the skills for a maritime career. Moored off Cockatoo Island and operated under the designation "Nautical School Ship Sobraon", over 4,000 boys were hosted and trained across a 20-year period.

=== HMAS Tingira ===
The Australian federal government purchased the ship in 1911 for use as a training ship for the fledgling Royal Australian Navy (RAN). She was refitted, commissioned into the RAN as HMAS Tingira (an Aboriginal word for "open sea") on 25 April 1912, and moored in Rose Bay. Up to 250 boys between the ages of 14½ and 16 could be trained at any time, although the trainee complement rarely exceeded 200. Between 1912 and 1927, 3,158 boys were trained for naval service. As Tingira was immobilised, the steam yacht HMAS Sleuth was attached to the training ship as a tender, and used to provide seagoing experience to recruits.

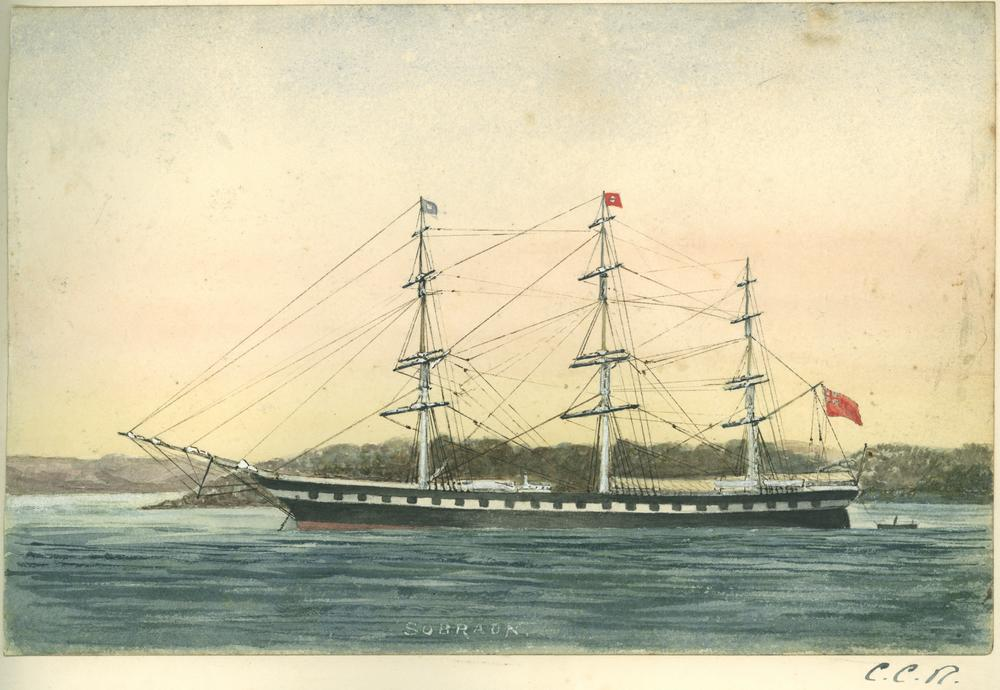
Watercolor of Sobraon by Charles Collinson Rawson

== Fate ==
Tingira was paid off on 30 June 1927, and laid up in Berry's Bay. In 1929, the ship was sold to a private owner, but he did not put her to any use before passing away in 1935. Tingira was then purchased by Major Friere (a retired British Army officer) in 1936, who was working with Louisa Ankin to preserve the ship as a national relic. Two years later, the ship was sold to a ship breaker by mortgagees; Friere and Ankin attempted to repurchase the ship, but were unsuccessful. Tingira was broken up in 1941.

Teenage trainees at the RAN's Junior Recruit Training Establishment (which operated at Fremantle naval base HMAS Leeuwin from 1960 to 1984) wore shoulder flashes bearing the name "Tingira" as a historical link with the training ship. Tingira Memorial Park, a small park on the Rose Bay waterfront, commemorates HMAS Tingira. The park was established in two phases; the first opening in 1962, the second completed in 1977.
