= Prince of Thieves (disambiguation) =

Robin Hood: Prince of Thieves is a 1991 film about the legendary outlaw Robin Hood.

Prince of Thieves may also refer to:

- Robin Hood, sometimes known as the "Prince of Thieves"
- The Prince of Thieves, a 1948 film about Robin Hood
- Prince of Thieves, or Le Prince des Voleurs, an 1872 Robin Hood novel attributed to Alexandre Dumas
- Prince of Thieves, a 2004 novel written by Chuck Hogan

== See also ==
- Princess of Thieves, a 2001 TV show starring Keira Knightley
- King of Thieves (disambiguation)
- Robin Hood: Prince of Thieves (disambiguation)
