= Robin Hood: Prince of Thieves (disambiguation) =

Robin Hood: Prince of Thieves is a 1991 adventure film about the legendary outlaw Robin Hood.

Robin Hood: Prince of Thieves may also refer to:

- Robin Hood: Prince of Thieves (video game), a 1991 video game tie-in
- Robin Hood: Prince of Thieves (2009 film), a 2009 Indian film

== See also ==
- The Prince of Thieves, a 1948 Robin Hood film
- Robin Hood (disambiguation)
- Prince of Thieves (disambiguation)
