= Scottish Maid =

First British clipper vessel

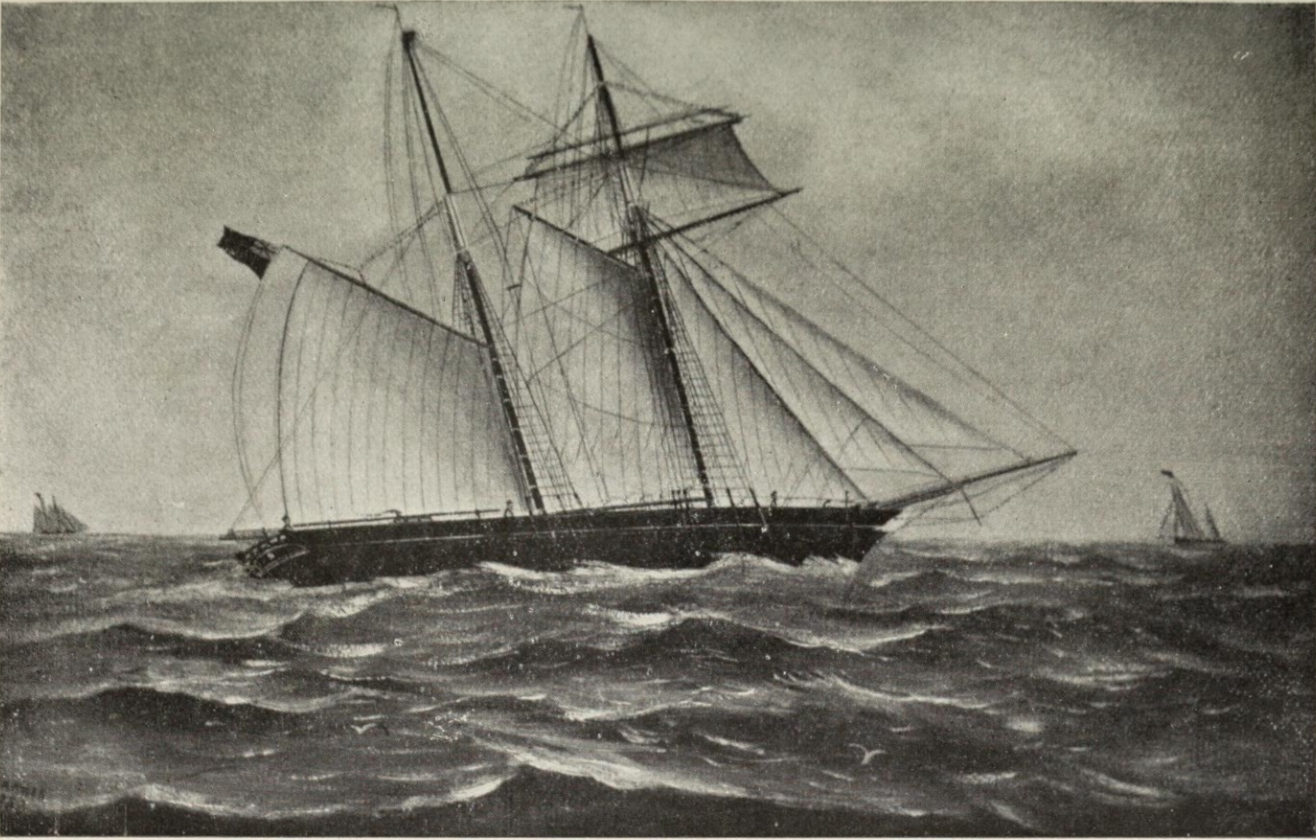
- Scottish Maid, painting by J. Fanner (1888)

History
- Owner: Alexander Nicol & George Munro (Note: Subsequent owners were: George Leslie sr. (1843); George Leslie jr., George Jamieson, Francis Smith & John Robertson (1862); George Leslie jr. & Francis Smith (1868); John Crombie, George Leslie jr. & William A. Adam (1871); John Crombie (1879).)
- Port of registry: Aberdeen (4 November 1843)
- Route: Aberdeen to London (originally)
- Ordered: 1839
- Builder: Alexander Hall and Sons
- Cost: £1700
- Yard number: 101
- Laid down: 1839
- Launched: 15 July 1839
- Home port: Aberdeen, Scotland
- Identification: UK Official Number: 3507
- Fate: Wrecked (26 August 1888)

General characteristics
- Type: Schooner, clipper
- Tonnage: 142 GRT ("1836 measurement"), 136 NRT
- Length: 89.25 feet (27.20 m) (internal)
- Beam: 19.6 feet (6.0 m) (internal)
- Depth: 11.4 feet (3.5 m) (internal)
- Sail plan: Two-mast topsail schooner
- Complement: c.6
- Notes: Coaster: general cargo; constructed of wood

Scottish Maid was a Scottish packet boat, a two-masted wooden schooner, built at Alexander Hall and Sons' boatyard in 1839 for the Aberdeen Line. She has been described as the first clipper vessel to be built in Britain. Her design of sharp, forward-raked bow, later called the "clipper bow" or Aberdeen bow, pioneered a succession of larger clipper ships with many also built in Aberdeen on Scotland's northeast coast.

Scottish Maid was designed to take advantage of a deficiency in Britain's tonnage laws of 1836 so that her officially measured tonnage, and hence tax payable, was low compared with her load carrying capacity. As her designers anticipated, her shape of hull produced a fast vessel and to optimise this her bow (pointed front) was given an innovative shape to cut through the water cleanly – a profile that turned out to be particularly successful. The extreme clipper ships later in the 19th century had substantially larger hulls though they were somewhat similar in shape.

The word "clipper" was first used for sailing vessels in the United States and argument arose in the 20th century about whether Scottish Maid's underlying design had been copied from America, and whether she should properly have been called a clipper at all. It now seems agreed that "clipper" is best regarded as simply a name for a fast merchant sailing vessel and the particular design was arrived at independently on the two sides of the Atlantic.

Much of Scottish Maid's career was transporting passengers and goods between Aberdeen and London. She was lost in a storm off the Farne Islands in 1888; the crew escaped by lifeboat.

== Background ==
=== Shipbuilding in Aberdeen in early 19th century ===
From the beginning of the nineteenth century the word "clipper" started to be used in Britain for a fast sailing ship. Also, at this time the Aberdeen shipbuilding industry started to expand considerably. Communication with London was via the North Sea along Britain's east coast. Aberdeen's first steam ship, Queen of Scotland, a paddle steamer with a wooden hull, was built by John Duffus and Co. in 1829 and there followed a succession of similar vessels. Aberdeen's first iron ship was the John Garrow launched in 1837. The most prominent of Aberdeen's six shipyards, that of Alexander Hall and Sons, had been established in 1790 – between 1811 and 1877 they built 290 vessels with tonnages from 20 to 2,600 tons. In the 1830s, facing competition on its route to London from paddle steamers that were faster than conventional sailing ships, the Aberdeen Line contracted with Hall's shipyard for a sailing vessel providing a better design of coastal packet boat for the London route and in 1839 the Scottish Maid became the first of a series of similar vessels described by Clark as "the highest pinnacle of the shipbuilders' art".

=== 1836 tonnage law ===
In 1836 a new law was introduced in Britain for measuring the load carrying capacity (registered tonnage) of a ship. The officially measured tonnage was particularly important for ships trading on short routes and making frequent use of harbours because charges for employing a maritime pilot, entering ports and for docking depended on tonnage. The "new measurement" of a ship's gross register tonnage involved estimating the internal cross-sectional area averaged over several places along the hull and multiplying this by the overall internal length. The length was measured at a height of half-depth at the midship position. (Note: Half-depth is half the distance between the floor of the vessel and the weather deck. The midship position is the transverse section halfway along the length of the ship.) Hall's designers realised that by having the bow and stern, angled away from vertical when above half-depth, the measured tonnage would be less for a greater load carrying capacity. Increasing the length would, by itself, have increased the tonnage. However, it also spread farther apart the positions at which the cross-sectional areas were to be measured so, if the vessel had pointed ends, the outermost areas would become smaller and so the average area would also be reduced. The Halls correctly calculated this would reduce the tonnage even if the vessel was longer and could carry more goods. They also anticipated that a pointed bow with a highly raked stem would improve the speed of the vessel.

== Design ==
=== Aberdeen bow ===
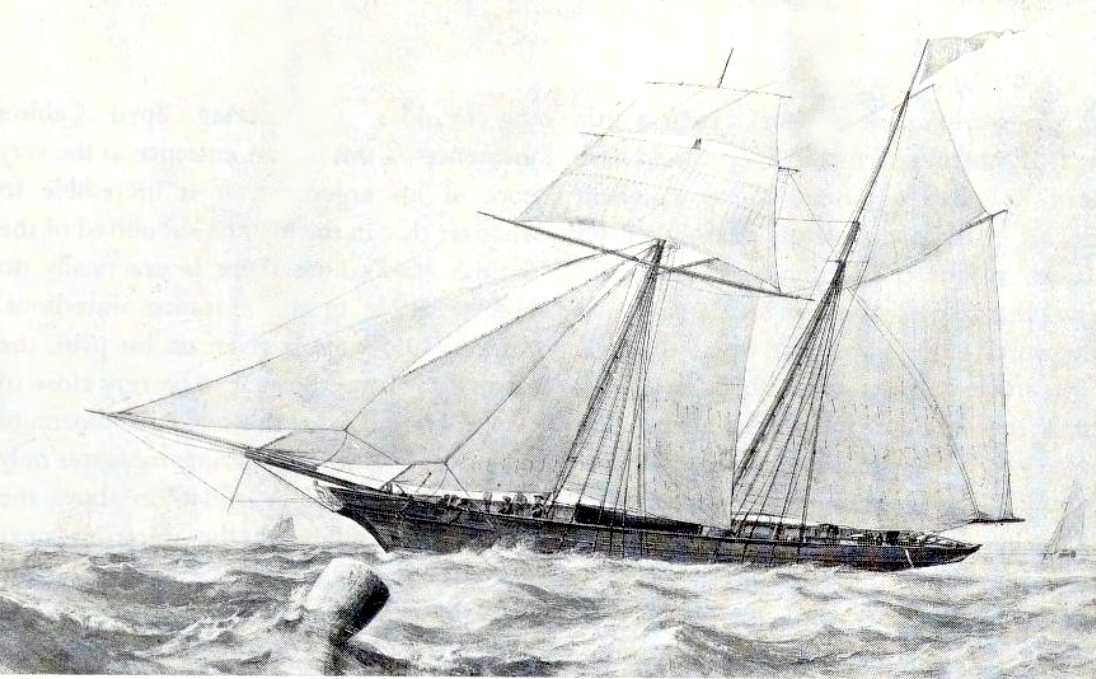
Non-Such (1842), sister ship of Scottish Maid and very similar in appearance, showing "Aberdeen bow" (Note: MacGregor notes that Scottish Maid's sister vessels Non-Such, Rapid and Swift were very similar in size, rig and general appearance. The half-hull shipbuilder's design model made by Hall's and now in the Glasgow Museums represents both Scottish Maid and Non-Such.)

For the reasons given above, the 1836 change in tonnage law advantaged vessels that were larger at points above half-depth and also that were pointed at the bow (and stern) even if the pointed shape made the vessel artificially longer. Scottish Maid was the first to have been deliberately designed to take advantage of the new law and was early in Britain to have a markedly pointed bow with the wooden beam at the very front angled forward sharply. This gave what at the time was a very striking appearance.

Anxious that such a radical design would not be approved by the purchasers, Halls shipyard built the new vessel starting from the stern and then constructed a temporary "skeleton" bow at the front to gain Aberdeen Line's approval. Once completed and launched, the Scottish Maid exceeded expectations.

=== Vessel design ===
Aberdeen Maritime Museum
Scottish Maid images
Scale replica model
Original model in sail
Half-hull model

David R. MacGregor
detailed reconstruction of lines
hull lines and sail plan

Scottish Maid was designed and built after Alexander Hall had handed over the firm he had founded to his sons, James and William. She was a two-masted gaff-rigged schooner with a topsail and her carvel hull (Note: Lloyd's classification: 5A1- oak, beech and larch with fir planking.) included a single deck and boasted a female figurehead. She carried a clinker-built longboat and jolly boat.

In America some vessels, particularly the Baltimore clippers, had been called clippers for some time – Scottish Maid and her sister vessels also started to become known under this name which became associated with their particular shape of hull. Scottish Maid's "clipper bow", later also to be called the "Aberdeen bow", was designed to make the vessel fast and maneuverable. Scale models were tested in a water tank. (Note: group) A pointed bow was selected for the hull with the stem sharply raked forward (at some 50° from vertical) and the sternpost and masts raked aft. Then a mock-up was fitted to a conventional hull to demonstrate to the owners the intended design. Not only was the bow raked forward but the planking of the hull went over the stem, right to the front of the bow so the vessel cut the water cleanly. The bowsprit was kept low to leave room for larger headsails. The bow-lines were straight although below the waterline they were slightly hollow. (Note: A bow-line is the shape of a ship's bow where it cuts the water and at horizontal planes above and below the waterline. Confusingly all these lines can also be called water-lines. A concave line (also called hollow) produces a front to the hull that is particularly sharp.)

The vessel proved to be very fast, travelling between Aberdeen and London (500 miles (800 km)) in 49 hours at an average speed of about 9 knots and competing well against steam driven paddle steamers so in 1842 Hall's built three sister ships of the same design.

== Career ==
Scottish Maid was a packet boat, carrying cargo and passengers between Aberdeen and London. At the time about 250 sailing vessels and a number of steamers were used on this route. By sea the fare was two guineas (£2.10) for cabin passengers, and one guinea for steerage – far lower than for road or rail. Using three clippers Aberdeen Line ran a weekly service each way while Aberdeen and London Steam Navigation operated four steamers. In 1847 the manager of a company owning three sister ships wrote "I can say with truth, that any of these clippers will go twice as fast by the wind (that is, to windward) in blowing weather as [...] the best and only smack of the Company's old ships [...] I have never seen any sort of vessels to equal the clippers for sailing, cargo carrying, and making good weather in a gale".

In February 1854 Scottish Maid carried emigrant passengers to Australia who wrote to the press praising the attention and kindness given to them by the captain.

In 1853 the collectors of excise brought a case against the ship's master, Arthur Sinclair, who had only declared one gallon of whisky but over three gallons were found on board. The case was dismissed after Sinclair said that he knew nothing of the extra spirit. In 1862 one of the crew fell overboard and was drowned while the vessel was in tow down the River Tyne at Jarrow. When in passage from Stettin to Newcastle in 1867 she met drift ice and was forced ashore at Kronborg. She was helped off and towed in to Elsinore.

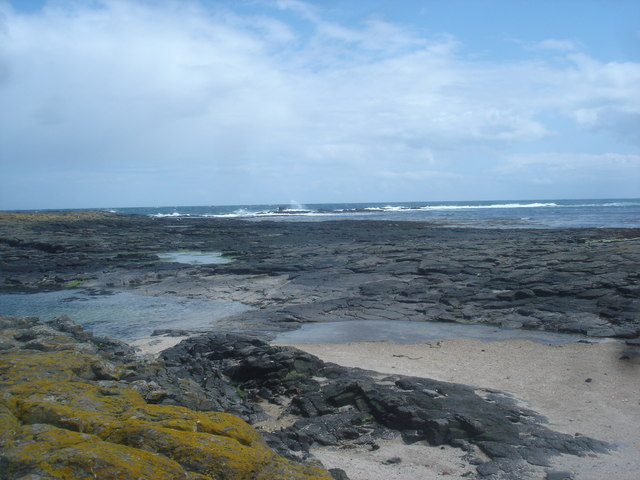
Looking north from near Longstone Lighthouse to see waves breaking over the Knivestone (right of photo), site of Scottish Maid's sinking

In 1884 the vessel was underway to Sunderland when she got caught in a severe storm that sank several other vessels. Scottish Maid was blown past her destination but was able to anchor in Bridlington Bay from where she was towed in to Bridlington. She made her own way back to Sunderland but from there had to be towed back to Aberdeen for major repairs because her topmasts and rigging had been destroyed.

On 26 August 1888, when carrying a cargo of 200 tons of stone from Aberdeen to Newcastle, Scottish Maid struck the Knivestone reef, (Note: The reef was called "Navestone Rock" or "Knavestone Rock" in the nineteenth century and later "Knivestone Rock". It is located at 55°39′01″N 1°35′58″W) a mostly submerged reef one kilometre farther offshore than Longstone Rock in the Farne Islands, the site of Longstone Lighthouse and the famous 1838 Grace Darling rescue. After the crew had tried for nearly seven hours to pump out the incoming seawater they had to abandon ship as Scottish Maid sank and was totally wrecked. The six crew were able to reach shore safely near Seahouses using their lifeboat.

== Scottish Maid's place in the evolution of Aberdeen clippers ==
In the earliest decades of the 19th century the route between London and Leith, Edinburgh's port on Scotland's east coast, was served by single-masted cutter-rigged smacks with a large and unmanageable mainsail so that a crew of 14 might be required. The 460-mile (740 km) voyage, for passengers, mail and cargo, took 50 hours at the very best (about 8 knots, somewhat faster than the more expensive stagecoach), 5–6 days for a swift passage, and several weeks in adverse conditions. There was no railway linking the cities. By 1830 two-masted schooners were beginning to be used and their more efficient sail plan involving both square and fore-and-aft sails reduced the time for the passage and made it somewhat more predictable.

The broad, short shape of the hulls of these vessels was required by a 1784 anti-smuggling law that required that the length of a vessel (excluding square-rigged) should be no more than 3.5 times longer than its beam. In 1836 the law was changed to make it possible to have narrower ships so vessels intended to be fast could take advantage of this.

Glasgow Museums
Scottish Maid / Nonsuch image
Original half-hull model

In 1839 some Aberdeen ship owners, aware of the upcoming competition from the Aberdeen and London Steam Navigation Company, approached Hall's shipyard for a fast schooner and orders for the other three sister vessels followed Scottish Maids success. The design of the bow was credited for the improved speed and by 1848 thirty-six similar vessels had been built, twenty-seven of them schooners. After 1845 Hall's were receiving orders from London and Liverpool and ships from other countries were being built to similar designs.

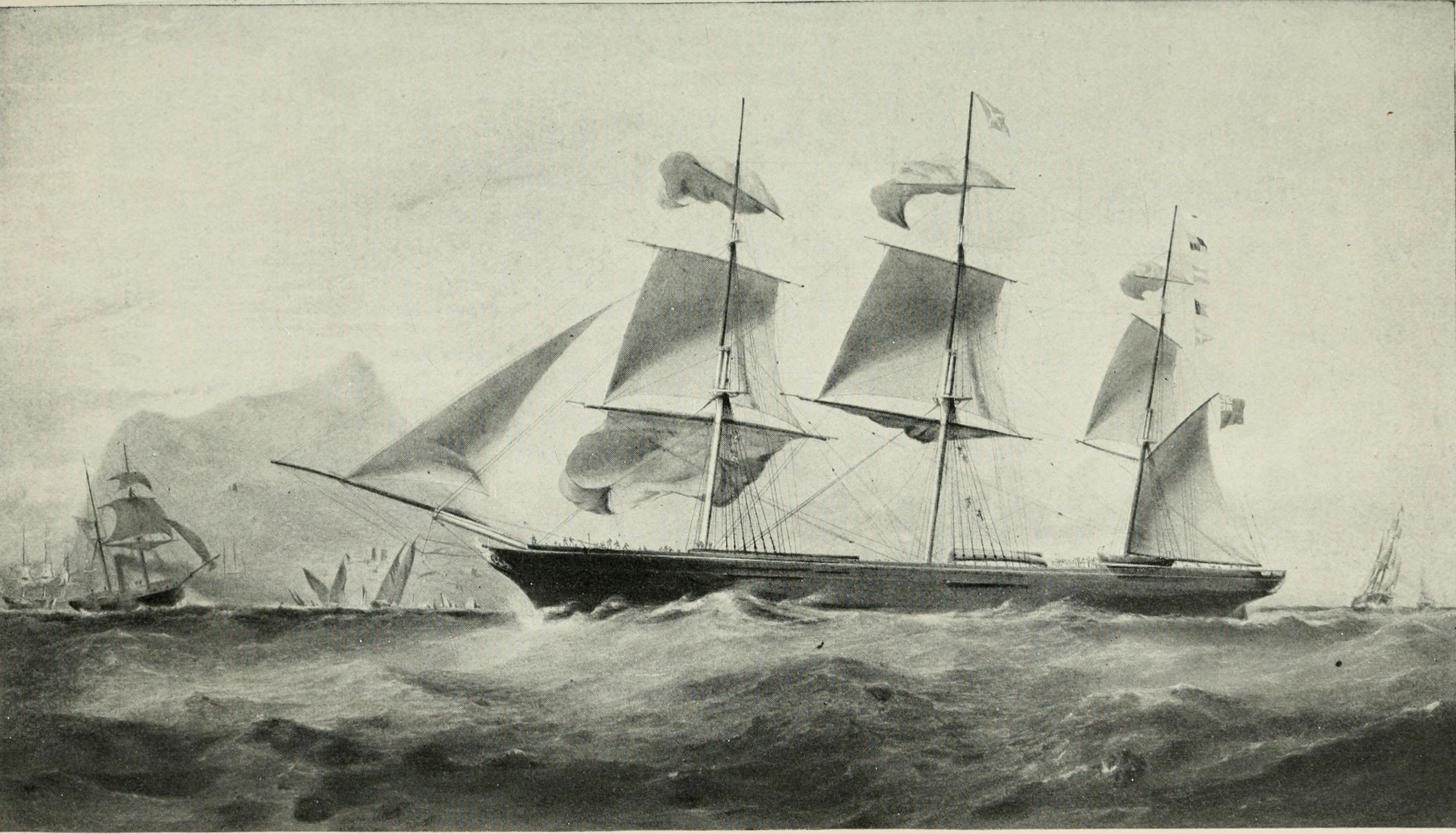
Hall's clipper ship Stornoway

Aberdeen's first transoceanic tea clippers, built in 1846, did not show a particular turn of speed because the "Aberdeen bow" was less well suited to larger full-rigged ships. Nonetheless, for smaller vessels the Aberdeen bow became well known in shipbuilding circles and the ships became called "clippers" Hall's clipper ship Stornoway, built in 1850, soon became known as a "China clipper". The Aberdeen-built Thermopylae of 1868 was to compete with Cutty Sark (1869) but 1869 was the year of the last clipper, Caliph, to be built in Aberdeen because the opening of the Suez Canal made them obsolescent.

== Communications in Mariner's Mirror, 1943–1948 ==
In the academic journal Mariner's Mirror of 1943, Boyd Cable (Note: Boyd Cable was the pseudonym of Ernest Andrew Ewart {1878–1943}, a Scottish émigré to Australia. His identity was only widely known after his death.) published "The World's First Clipper" which awarded the accolade to Scottish Maid. Despite the title the article starts with a lengthy appreciation, almost a eulogy, of Alexander Hall who started life as a farm worker in Auchterless in remote, rural Aberdeenshire and went on to establish and run Aberdeen's pre-eminent shipyard Alexander Hall and Sons which built Scottish Maid. Cable was aware that in America ships known as "clippers", particularly the Baltimore Clippers, had been around for decades but he declared that these were not true clippers because their design of hull did not match that of the quintessential clippers, the very fast mercantile sailing vessels of the later 19th century. His requisite design, a pointed bow with concave bow-lines and a stem angled steeply forward, started, in his estimation, with the Scottish Maid of 1839 and was followed in America by the Rainbow in 1845. The Baltimore clipper Ann McKim of 1833 had, he considered, convex bow-lines (Note: MacGregor writes that Ann McKim's bow lines were like those of Falcon (built at the Isle of Wight in 1824) which had convex hull lines with "only slight hollows at the ends". He wrote of "wild assumptions [...] that she was the first clipper ship". In the foreword to this book Howard Chapelle wrote in 1973 "The claims that English designs were influenced by American principles are completely exploded.")

Provoked by Cable's jingoistic article, John Lyman (Note: John Lyman (1915–1977) was professor of oceanography at North Carolina University, director of oceanography at the National Science Foundation, and a founder member of the North American Society for Oceanic History.) responded in 1944 with "The Scottish Maid as 'the World's First Clipper'" saying that the motivation for the Scottish vessel's hull profile was to avoid tax, not to increase speed, and that many similarly sized vessels of that era in both Europe and America had a similar shape of hull. The later larger clippers, now sometimes called extreme clippers, for structural reasons could not have a highly raked stem and these vessels were first built in the United States.

R. C. Anderson responded in 1945 with "Hollow Bows and 'First Clippers'" citing a well-made professional model in a Swedish museum of an English three-decker of 1665–1670 with a bow below the waterline more hollow than Rainbow. In 1946 William Salisbury wrote in "Hollow Water-Lines and Early Clippers" that Scottish Maid was simply one of the earlier clippers and much more research was needed in Britain to decide what interaction there was (if any) between American and British designs. J.Henderson reported he had inspected an original model at Hall's shipyard of a vessel with a greater stem rake than the Scottish Maid and its bow-lines were straight, not concave or convex.

In 1948 Howard Chapelle wrote of the claims in Boyd Cable's article "It is my opinion that these claims are wholly untenable and are to be accounted for only because Mr Cable did not know of the extensive American literature relating to the subject of clippers". Chapelle wrote that "clipper" had simply become a name for a fast sailing ship and that any discussion was useless unless it was with reference to a particular type of vessel. In 1973 MacGregor agreed with this opinion and wrote that, by any reasonable definition of clipper, Scottish Maid was not the first in Britain and doubted whether it was even the first in Aberdeen.
