= HMS Glitter =

History

United Kingdom
- Name: HMS Glitter until 1939, then HMS Raleigh
- Builder: Alexander Hall & Co., Aberdeen
- Launched: 8 October 1918
- Fate: Sold 1946, renamed Ocean Raleigh

United Kingdom
- Name: Ocean Raleigh
- In service: 1946
- Fate: Scrapped April 1960

General characteristics
- Class & type: Admiralty steel drifter
- Tonnage: 96 gross register tons
- Displacement: 199 tons
- Length: 86 ft (26 m)
- Beam: 18.5 ft (5.6 m)
- Armament: 1 × 6-pounder gun

HMS Glitter was an Admiralty steel drifter of the Royal Navy, constructed in 1918. She was one of 38 named vessels of the class that were completed in 1917-1918. She became a base ship in 1939, taking the name HMS Raleigh, and was sold into civilian service as Ocean Raleigh in 1946. She was scrapped in April 1960.
