= King of Thieves =

King of Thieves may refer to:

- The head thief of a thieves' guild

== Media ==
=== Film ===
- King of Thieves (2004 film), a German film directed by Ivan Fíla and starring Lazar Ristovski
- King of Thieves (2018 film), a British film produced by Working Title Films
- King of Thieves (2022 film), a Nigerian thriller film

=== Television ===
- "The King of Thieves", 1995 TV series episode of Hercules: The Legendary Journeys
- "The King of Thieves", 1969 TV series episode of It Takes a Thief

=== Music ===
- Errol Flynn (album), a 1989 album by The Dogs D'Amour released in the United States as
- "King of Thieves", 1983 song on the album Punch the Clock by Elvis Costello and the Attractions

=== Other ===
- The King of Thieves, 2008 mystery novel by Michael Jecks
- Gambit: King of Thieves, a 2012–2013 comic book series written by James Asmus and drawn by Clay Mann
- King of Thieves (video game), 2015 video game by ZeptoLab

== Fictional characters ==
- Wul-Takim, in the 1903 children's fantasy novel The Enchanted Island of Yew by L. Frank Baum
- Autolycus (played by Bruce Campbell), the self-proclaimed King of Thieves in the Hercules: The Legendary Journeys and Xena: Warrior Princess television series
- King of Thieves, sorcerer in the comic and animated series Teenage Mutant Ninja Turtles
- Ryo Bakura (a.k.a. Bakura, King of Thieves), in the anime and manga Yu-Gi-Oh!
- Ganondorf, in The Legend of Zelda video game series
- George Cooper, in the 1983 fantasy novel Alanna: The First Adventure by Tamora Pierce
- The Jackal, in the 2003 young adult fantasy novel The Oracle by Catherine Fisher
- Jonathan Wild, in the 2005–6 The Phantom story "Jonathan Wild: King of Thieves"
- Arsène Lupin in the 2007 video game Sherlock Holmes Versus Arsène Lupin

== See also ==
- Aladdin and the King of Thieves, a 1996 Disney direct-to-video film
- "Brum and the King of Thieves", a 2001 episode of the children's television series Brum
- Prince of Thieves (disambiguation)
