= SY Ena =

Australian steam yacht built in 1900

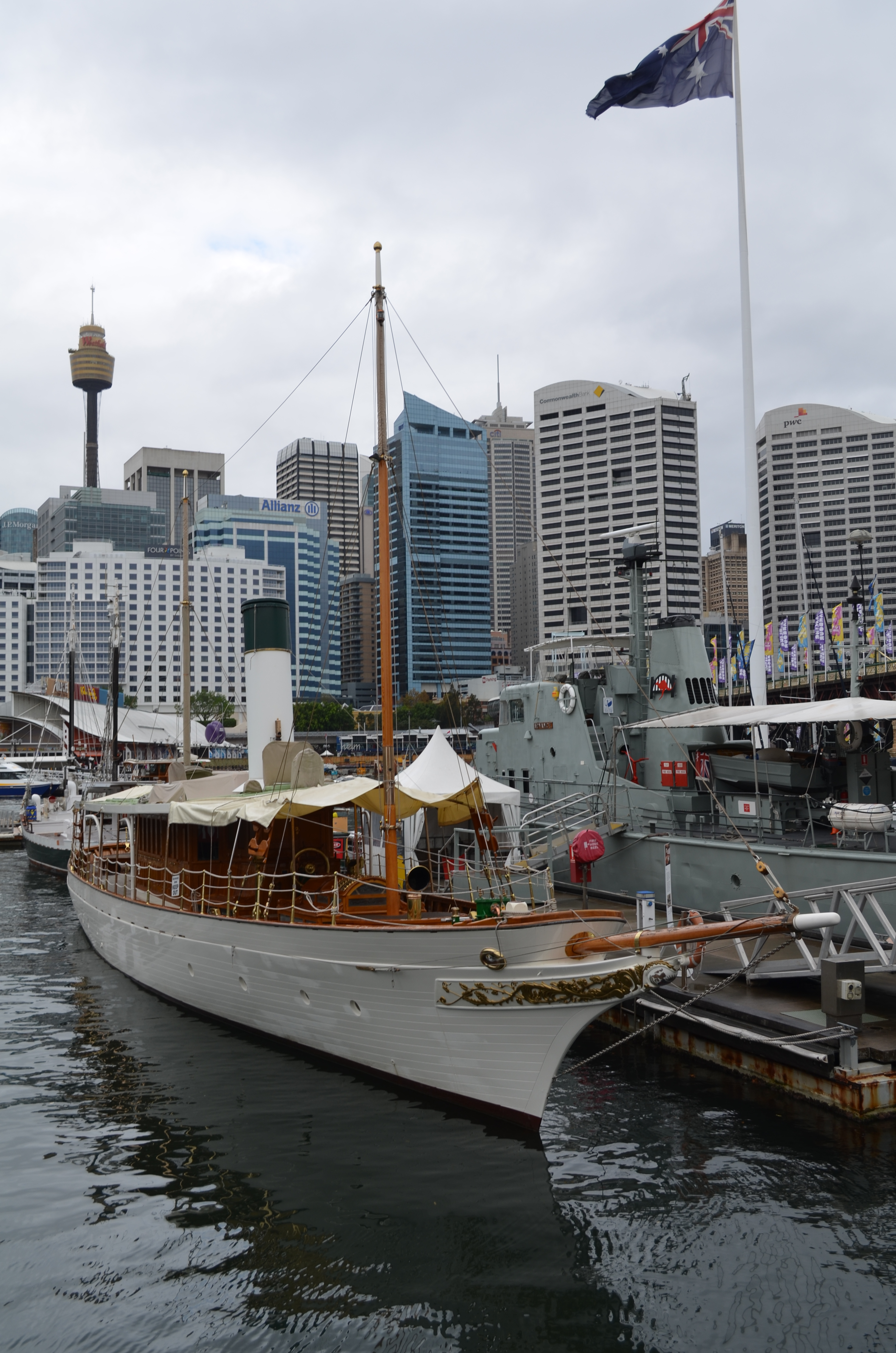
- Ena on display at the Australian National Maritime Museum

History

Australia
- Name: Ena (1900–1917, 1920–1940); Aurore (1940–1986); Ena/Ena III (1986–present)
- Namesake: Tryphena Dibbs, wife of the first owner
- Owner: Thomas Dibbs (1900–1917); several private owners (1920–1940); Roche Brothers (1940–1974); several private owners (1974–2017); Australian National Maritime Museum (2017–present)
- Builder: W M Ford Boatbuilders, Berrys Bay
- Cost: A£5,800
- Laid down: 1900
- Launched: 8 December 1900
- Completed: 1901
- Identification: Official Number 112529
- Status: Active as of 2021

Australia
- Name: HMAS Sleuth
- Commissioned: 13 January 1917
- Decommissioned: 1920

General characteristics
- Type: Steam yacht
- Tonnage: 65 GT; 44 NT
- Length: 88 ft (27 m) (minus bowsprit)
- Beam: 16.5 ft (5.0 m)
- Depth: 8.1 ft (2.5 m)
- Installed power: 1900 steam engine: 25 horsepower (19 kW); 1986 steam engine 80 horsepower (60 kW)
- Propulsion: 2-cylinder compound steam engine (1900–1945); diesel engine (1945–1986); Compound steam engine (1986–present)
- Armament: QF 3-pounder Hotchkiss gun (RAN service only)

The steam yacht Ena is a steam yacht that was built in 1900 for Thomas Dibbs, the commodore of the Royal Sydney Yacht Squadron. It was used as his private vessel for entertaining guests on Sydney Harbour and Pittwater until the beginning of World War I. In 1917 the yacht was purchased by the Royal Australian Navy (RAN) and used as the auxiliary patrol vessel HMAS Sleuth in the waters around the Torres Strait and Thursday Island, before later being used as a training ship tender based in Sydney.

In early 1920, the RAN disposed of the yacht and it returned to private use until later in the early 1930s when it was sold to Tasmania. Based in Hobart and under different owners SY Ena was used for a number of purposes including transportation of produce and fishing. It was converted to diesel power in the mid-1940s and renamed Aurore.

After sinking in the early 1980s, the yacht was refloated and eventually restored as a steam yacht close to its original configuration. SY Ena subsequently circumnavigated Australia, as part of a visit to Western Australia during the 1987 America's Cup and then served as a private charter vessel.

SY Ena is now based in Sydney at the Australian National Maritime Museum where it is part of the National Maritime Collection, and is also listed on the Australian Register of Historic Vessels.

== Design and construction ==
Built in 1900, Ena was commissioned by Thomas Dibbs, commodore of the Royal Sydney Yacht Squadron, as a replacement for his existing yacht of the same name. The vessel was designed by Walter Reeks (1861–1925) a Sydney naval architect based in Pitt St, who had come out from the UK in 1885. It was constructed by Walter McFarlane Ford Jnr of W M Ford Boatbuilders at Berrys Bay, Sydney, and designed and built to the high standards maintained by both Reeks and Ford. Its elegance and construction were recognised in a 1906 (American) Rudder magazine story on the vessel, and looking at it in retrospect, the steam yacht shows that Australian designers and shipbuilders could build luxury craft to the same quality and standards as in Europe or North America in this period of classic yachts.

The vessel, as built, had a length (not including bowsprit) of 88 feet (27 m), a beam of 16.5 feet (5.0 m), and a depth of 8.1 feet (2.5 m). Tonnage ratings were 65 tons gross and 44 tons net. Propulsion was provided by a 25-horsepower (19 kW) two-cylinder compound steam engine. The hull was built of Australian timbers with the exception of the NZ kauri topsodes planking. The superstructure was teak. The yacht was launched on 8 December 1900, and like Dibbs' previous yacht, was named Ena after his wife, Tryphena. The steam yacht cost A£5,800.

== Naval service ==
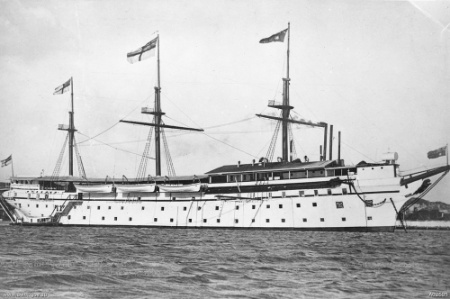
The training ship Tingira

SY Ena was purchased by the Royal Australian Navy (RAN) in January 1917 for A£1,000, and converted for use as an auxiliary patrol vessel around the Torres Strait and Thursday Island, armed with a QF 3 pounder Hotchkiss gun on the foredeck. The yacht was commissioned on 13 January 1917 as HMAS Sleuth. It proved unsuited for tropical patrol work, and Sleuth was later deployed along the Queensland coast, then relocated back to Sydney and assigned as a tender to the immobilised training ship Tingira. One of the yacht's roles was to take recruits out to sea to "show them what being seasick felt like".

== Private and commercial service ==
After the war, HMAS Sleuth was sold by the RAN for A£1,350, and eventually put back into recreational use. It changed ownership a couple of times but under one owner William Longworth, it often travelled between Sydney and Newcastle. In the early 1930s it was sold to Tasmania and taken to Hobart. The new owner used Ena to transport apples from Tasmania to the Australian mainland. Shortly after commencing this work, the yacht was impounded by creditors. It was later purchased in 1940 by the Roche brothers, renamed Aurore, and over the next few years was modified for trawling and scallop fishing. The stem was reduced, a diesel engine was installed in 1945, and facilities for keeping fish (including refrigerated storage and a wet well) were fitted. The Roches sold Aurore in 1974.

In 1981, Aurore sank in the D'Entrecasteaux Channel after hitting an unidentified object. The vessel was raised by a syndicate funded by Sydney businessman Pat Burke, stockbroker Rene Rivkin, and Rivkin's solicitor, David Baffksy. The wreck was restored by shipwright Nick Masterman close to her original condition, and an 80-horsepower (60 kW) compound steam engine recovered and restored from the former Derwent River ferry Excella was used to replace the diesel engine. The yacht resumed operation in 1986 under the Ena name. During 1987 and 1988, Ena circumnavigated Australia, as part of a planned visit to Western Australia for the 1987 America's Cup. On return to Sydney, Ena was used for private charter cruises until being seized a second time by creditors. It was sold to new owners in 1991, and seen on the harbour occasionally. In 2014 Ena was relocated by new owner Jonathan Turner to Melbourne, where the yacht was re-registered as Ena III and was operated on the Yarra River and in Port Phillip Bay. (Note: As at March 2021, Ena III remains her official registered name.) In early 2016 the yacht returned to Sydney, where it was later bought by a new private owner. In mid-2017 Ena was donated to the Australian National Maritime Museum, where it is part of the operating fleet and National Maritime Collection.
