= MIE =

MIE may refer to:

- Magnetic Isotope Effect
- Maine Indian Education
- Memory integrity enforcement
- Meta Information Encapsulation (ExifTool file format)
- Member of the Institution of Engineers, Sri Lanka
- Metal-induced embrittlement; see embrittlement
- Microsoft Internet Explorer
- Mie (singer) - a member of Japanese idol group Pink Lady.
- Mile End tube station, London (London Underground station code)
- Minimum Ignition Energy
- Minimally Invasive Education
- In toxicology, a Molecular Initiating Event or MIE sets off a chain of biological events (or adverse outcome pathway) that eventually leads to adverse effects.
- Mobile Internet Experience
- Muncie, IN, USA - Delaware County Airport (Airport Code)

== See also ==
- Mie (disambiguation)
