= The Legend of Robin Hood =

The Legend of Robin Hood may refer to:

- The Legend of Robin Hood (1968 film), an NBC television musical
- The Legend of Robin Hood (1971 film), an animated television film, aired as part of the CBS anthology series Famous Classic Tales
- The Legend of Robin Hood (TV series), a 1975 BBC television serial
- The Legend of Robin Hood (album), a 2021 album by Chris de Burgh
- The Legend of Robin Hood (board game)

== See also ==
- Robin Hood
