= ST Mies =

Tugboat built in 1945

History
- Name: ST Empire Connie (1945–46); HNLMS Mies (1946–47); ST Mies (1947–53); KRI Mies (1953–58); ST Mies (1958–78); ST Taluk Ambon (1978–83)
- Owner: Ministry of War Transport (1945); Ministry of Transport (1945–46); Royal Dutch Navy (1946–47); Netherlands East Indies Government (1947–51); Republiek Indonesia Serikat (1951–53); Indonesian Navy (1953–58); Indonesian Government (1958–78); Tanjung Priok Port Authority (1978–83)
- Operator: Townsend Bros (Ferries) Ltd (1945–46); Royal Dutch Navy (1946–47); Netherlands East Indies Government (1947–51); Republiek Indonesia Serikat (1951–53); Indonesian Navy (1953–58); Indonesian Government (1958–78); Tanjung Priok Port Authority (1978–83)
- Port of registry: (United Kingdom) Aberdeen (1945–46); Royal Netherlands Navy (1946–47); (Dutch East Indies) Havenwezen (1947–51); (Indonesia) Jakarta (1951–53); (Indonesia) Indonesian Navy (1953–58); (Indonesia) Jakarta (1958–78); (Indonesia) Tanjung Priok (1978–83)
- Builder: A Hall & Co Ltd
- Yard number: 707
- Launched: 10 July 1945
- Completed: September 1945
- Commissioned: 1946 (Royal Netherlands Navy); 1953 (Indonesian Navy)
- Decommissioned: 1947 or 49 (Royal Netherlands Navy); 1958 (Indonesian Navy)
- Identification: IMO number: 5234606; Code Letters GKGX (1945–46); United Kingdom Official Number 180993 (1945–46)
- Fate: Deleted from shipping registers in 1983

General characteristics
- Class & type: Tug
- Tonnage: 232 GRT; 218 NRT
- Length: 105 ft 2 in (32.05 m)
- Beam: 27 ft 1 in (8.26 m)
- Depth: 11 ft 7 in (3.53 m)
- Installed power: Triple expansion steam engine
- Propulsion: Screw propeller

Mies was a 242 GRT tug that was built as Empire Connie in 1945 by A Hall & Co Ltd, Aberdeen for the Ministry of War Transport (MoWT). In 1946, she was sold to the Royal Netherlands Navy and renamed Mies. In 1947, she was sold to the Government of the Dutch East Indies, passing to the Indonesian Government in 1951 and then the Indonesian Navy in 1953. In 1978, she was sold and renamed Taluk Ambon, serving until 1983 when she was deleted from shipping registers.

== Description ==
The ship was built as yard number 707 by A Hall and Co, Aberdeen. She was launched on 10 July 1945 and completed in September 1945. Mies was 105 feet 2 inches (32.05 m) long, with a beam of 27 feet 1 inch (8.26 m) and had a depth of 11 feet 7 inches (3.53 m). The ship had a GRT of 242 and a NRT of 218. Mies was propelled by a triple expansion steam engine, which had cylinders of 16 inches (41 cm), 25 inches (64 cm) and 42 inches (110 cm) diameter by 27 inches (69 cm) stroke. The engine was No. 416, It was built by Hall & Co.

== History ==
Empire Connie was built for the MoWT. She was placed under the management of Townsend Bros (Ferries) Ltd. The Code Letters GKGX and United Kingdom Official Number 180993 were allocated. She served in India and Singapore. In 1946, she was sold to the Royal Netherlands Navy and renamed Mies.

In 1947, or 1949, Mies was transferred to the Dutch East Indies Government. Her port of registry was Havenwezen. In 1951, Mies was transferred to the Republiek Indonesia Serikat at which time she was converted to operate on oil fuel. Her port of registry was changed to Jakarta. In 1953, Mies was transferred to the Indonesian Navy, serving until 1958 when she was transferred back to the Indonesian Government.

In 1978, Mies was sold to the Port Authority of Tanjung Priok and was renamed Taluk Ambon. She served until 1983, being deleted from Lloyd's Register in that year. It's unknown whether she was scrapped or preserved.
