= Robin Hood and His Merry Men (disambiguation) =

Robin Hood and His Merry Men is a 1908 short film directed by Percy Stow.

Robin Hood and His Merry Men may also refer to:

- Robin Hood and His Merry Men, a 1921 novel by Sara Hawks Sterling
- Robin Hood and His Merry Men, a 1927 novel by E. C. Vivian
- Robin Hood and His Merry Men, a 1994 novel by Jane Louise Curry
