= Robin Hood v. United States =

US civil court case

Hood v. United States
- Court: United States District Court for the Northern District of California
- Full case name: Robin Hood v. United States Government
- Decided: March 16, 2012
- Citation: CV 12-01542

Case history
- Appealed to: United States Court of Appeals for the Ninth Circuit

Robin Hood v. United States CV 12-01542 was a 2012 United States District Court for the Northern District of California civil court case. The case was brought by a person named Robin Hood against the United States government for allegedly violating the Racketeer Influenced and Corrupt Organizations Act (RICO). The case was heard under the plaintiff being in forma pauperis but the case was dismissed as frivolous litigation after Hood failed to state a claim for relief. Hood appealed the ruling requesting retention of in forma pauperis status but this was denied due to frivolous claims made during the court proceedings.

== Background ==
Hood filed the case on behalf of himself and others, alleging that the United States government had violated the RICO act, stating that he and others had been "robbed by banks, attorneys and the government they tried to support". Hood, representing himself in pro per, also requested his case be heard in forma pauperis. This request was granted however, the court dismissed the case with prejudice after Hood had failed to include a claim for relief.

== Appeal ==
Hood made several further filings with the court after the initial judgement. He filed a "Motion to Authenticate Documents as the Court might want to Reconsider" arguing "To dismiss these cases would show a cover-up to such complaints as this Racketeer Influenced and Corrupt Organization in which other related cases show such abuses". He also requested to maintain his in forma pauperis status after the case had been closed. Both requests were denied. Hood then appealed to the United States Court of Appeals for the Ninth Circuit regarding maintaining in forma pauperis status. The Court of Appeals returned the case to the district court to determine if the status should continue or if the case was deemed bad faith or frivolous.

The court ruled that as the plaintiff had not submitted any evidence for his claim of a breach of RICO, the appeal was dismissed with leave to amend should the plaintiff identify pertinent facts and claim of relief. However, as Hood had made several baseless filings during the proceedings, including alleging unsubstantiated breaches of several clauses of the United States Constitution, the court judged the case to be frivolous and revoked Hood's in forma pauperis status.
