= Robin Hood (ship) =

Tea clipper

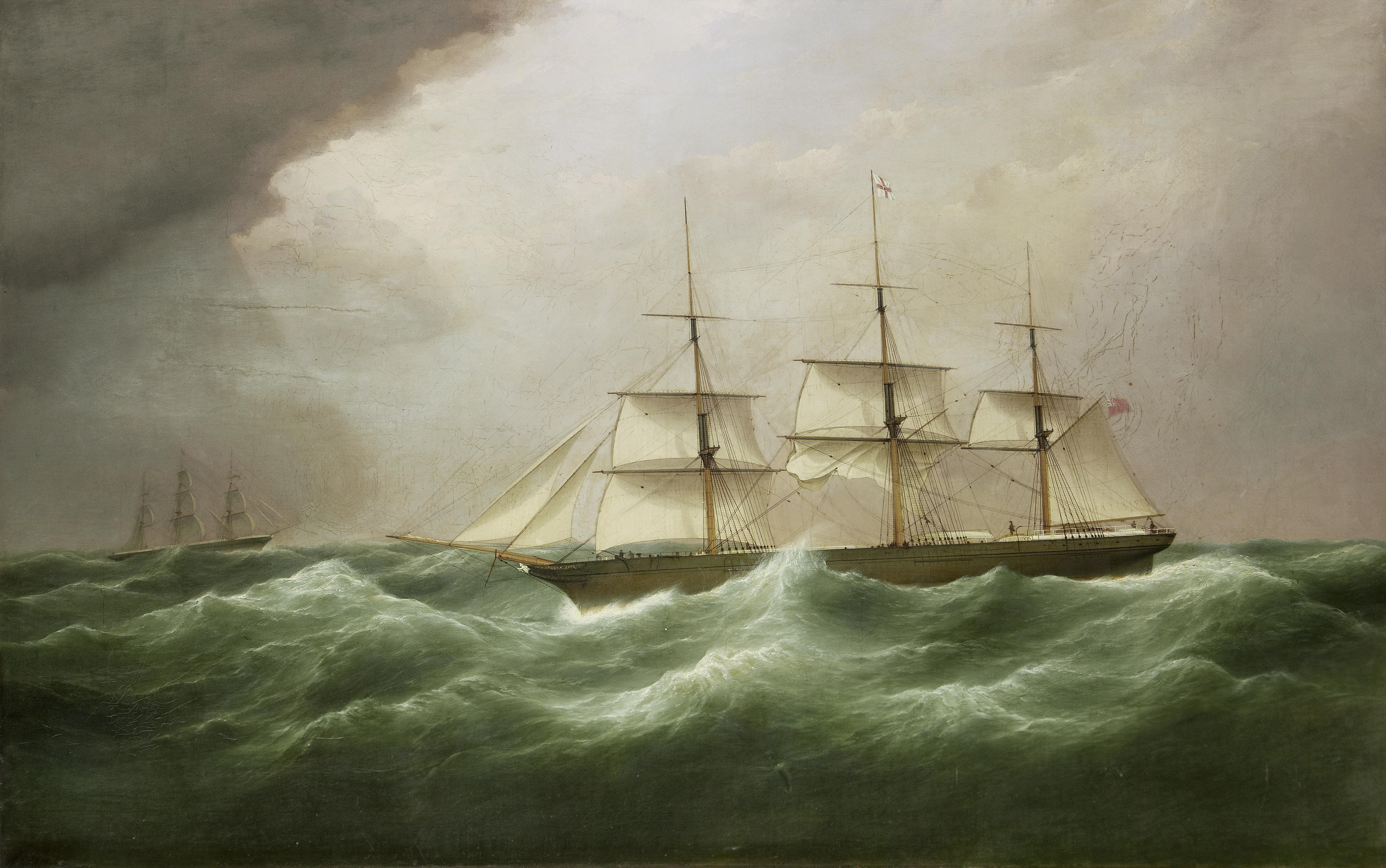

History

United Kingdom
- Name: Robin Hood
- Owner: J. Wade
- Builder: Alexander Hall and Sons, Aberdeen, Scotland
- Launched: 1856

General characteristics
- Type: Clipper
- Tons burthen: 852 tons
- Length: 204 feet (62 m)
- Beam: 35 feet 1 inch (10.69 m)
- Draught: 21 feet (6.4 m)

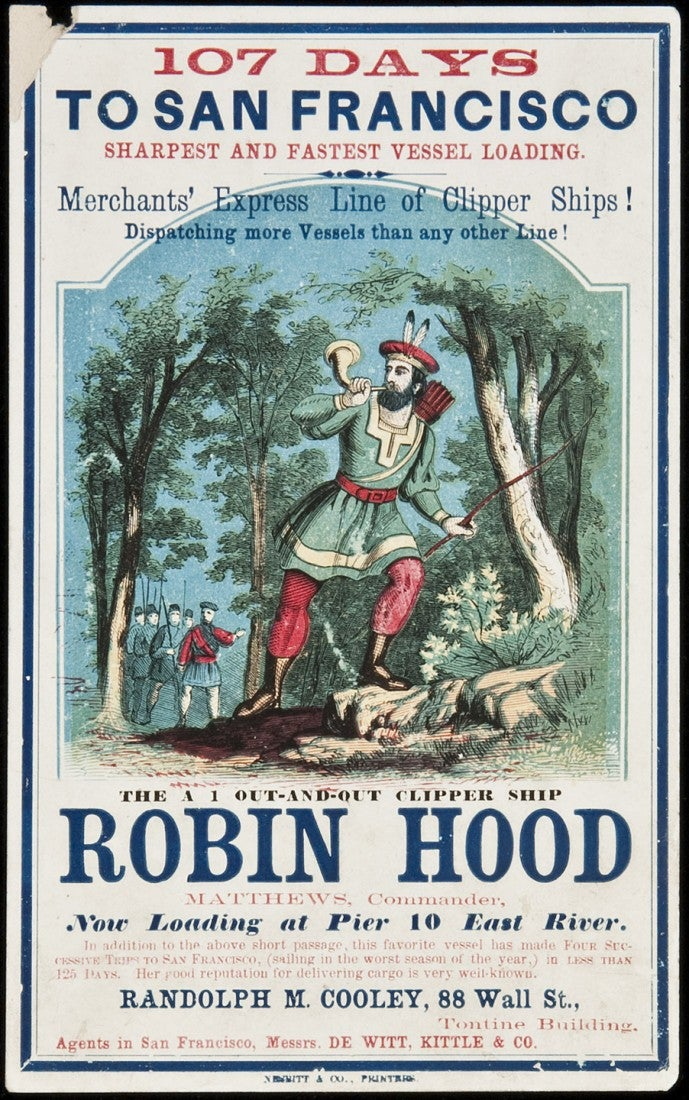
Clipper ship sailing card

Robin Hood was a tea clipper built by Alexander Hall and Sons, in Aberdeen, Scotland, in 1856. The ship's best known commander was Capt. Cobb. The ship is remembered for a 107-day passage to San Francisco.
