= Stornoway (clipper) =

Historical British tea clipper ship

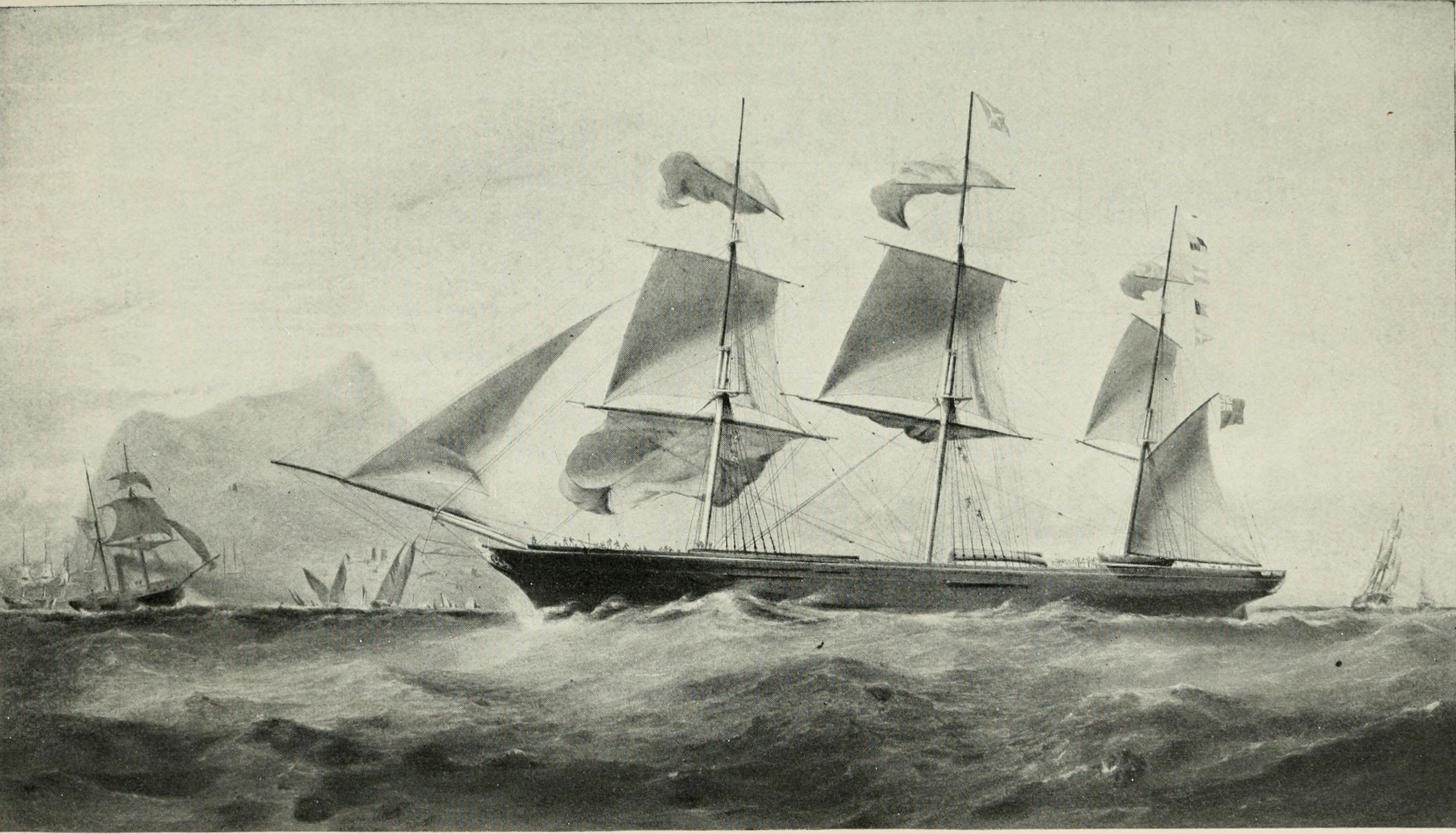
- The Stornoway

History

United Kingdom
- Name: Stornoway
- Owner: Jardine Matheson
- Builder: Alexander Hall and Sons, Aberdeen
- Launched: 24 August 1850
- Fate: Wrecked at the mouth of the Thames on the Kentish Knock, 7 June 1873

General characteristics
- Tons burthen: 595 old measurement; 527 new measurement
- Length: 157.8 ft (48.1 m)
- Beam: 28.8 ft (8.8 m)
- Draught: 17.8 ft (5.4 m)
- Depth: 17.8 ft (5.4 m)
- Sail plan: fully rigged ship

Stornoway was a British tea clipper built by Alexander Hall and Sons in Aberdeen, Scotland in 1850. She was a further development by Hall on the clippers built in Aberdeen in 1848 (which included Hall's tea clipper Reindeer), being larger and more obviously suited to deep sea service. She was ordered by Jardine Matheson specifically for the tea trade. In the late 1840s, tea was available earlier in the season in China, so the first ships to load had to beat to windward against the north-east monsoon to get across the China Sea. The details of the hull shape designed by Hall had this requirement in mind.

== Name ==
She was named after Stornoway Castle, Lewis, one of the Hebrides Isles, owned by Sir James Matheson at the time.

== Maiden Voyage ==
Her maiden voyage was a passage from the Downs to Java Head, which she made it under command of Captain Robertson in 80 days and to Hongkong in 102 days. She sailed then from Hongkong to London in just 103 days. These were the fastest passages between these ports by a British vessel at the time.

== Masters ==
She is famous for her race with the clipper Chrysolite. During her lifetime Stornoway was commanded by various Masters.

Date	1850–53	1853–62	1863–64	1865–68	1869–72	1872–73
Name	Capt. John Robertson	Capt. H. L. Hart	Capt. Watson	Capt. Tomlins	Capt. J. Waugh	Capt. G. Greener

She was sold by Jardine Matheson to Mackay & Co., London, in 1861. Then in 1867 she was sold to Welch & Co., Newcastle, and in 1871 was again sold to Mr Ralph Chapman, Newcastle. She was wrecked at the mouth of the Thames in bad weather, 7 June 1873, on the Kentish Knock. Her crew of 13 were rescued. She was on a voyage from South Shields, County Durham to Villaricos, Spain carrying a cargo of coal and coke.
