= Mie =

Mie may refer to:

== Places ==
- Mie, Ōita (三重町), a former town in Ōita Prefecture, Japan
- Mie District, Mie (三重郡), a district in Mie Prefecture, Japan
- Mie Prefecture (三重県), a prefecture of Japan

== Other uses ==
- Mie (train), a train service in Japan
- Mie (crater), a crater on Mars
- Mie (pose), a pose in Kabuki theatre
- Mie Kotsu, a Japanese public transportation company
- Mie theory or Mie scattering, a solution of Maxwell's equations for the scattering of electromagnetic radiation

== People ==
- Mie (singer), Japanese singer and actress, member of the duo Pink Lady

=== Given name ===
- Mie Augustesen (born 1988), Danish handball player
- Mie Hama (born 1943), Japanese actress
- Mie Hamada (born 1959), Japanese figure skater and coach
- Mie Kumagai, Sega video game producer
- Mie Lacota (born 1988), Danish professional road and track cyclist
- Mie Mie (born 1970), Burmese democracy activist
- Mie Sonozaki (born 1973), Japanese voice actress and singer
- Mie Suzuki (born 1958), Japanese voice actress
- Mie Uehara (上原 三枝; born 1971), Japanese speed skater

=== Surname ===
- Gustav Mie (1869–1957), German physicist

== See also ==
- MIE (disambiguation)
- Mies (disambiguation)
