= Alexander Hall and Sons =

Coordinates: 57.1436°N 2.0743°W

Alexander Hall and Sons was a shipbuilder that operated in Aberdeen from 1797 to 1957. They designed the pointed and sharply raked Aberdeen bow" first used on the Scottish Maid and which became a characteristic of the "extreme clippers". They primarily produced schooner and later clipper ships until the 1870s. They were the largest firm of shipbuilders during the final stages of the Age of Sail.

== History ==
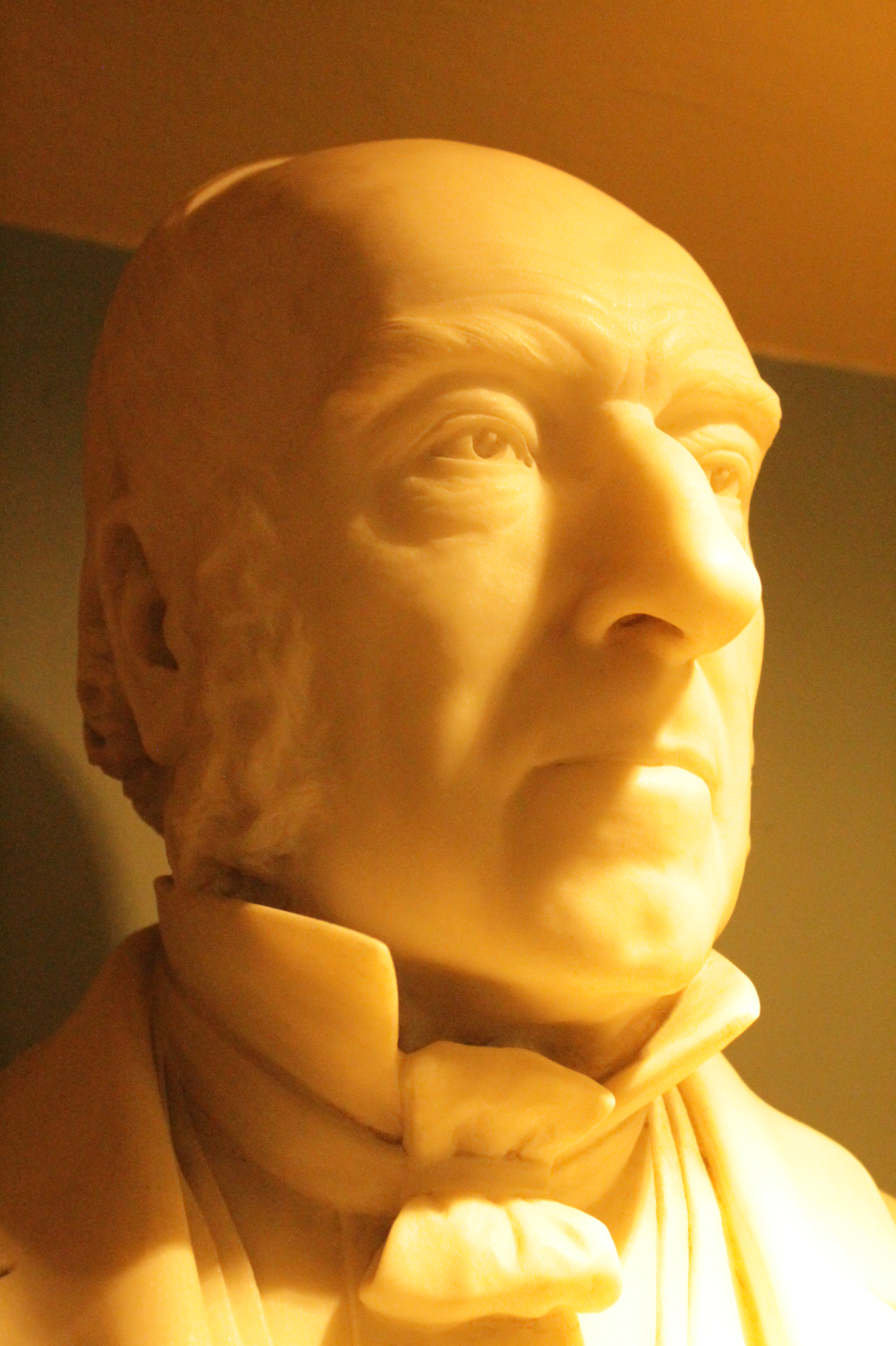
William Hall of Alexander Hall & Sons, Aberdeen shipbuilders

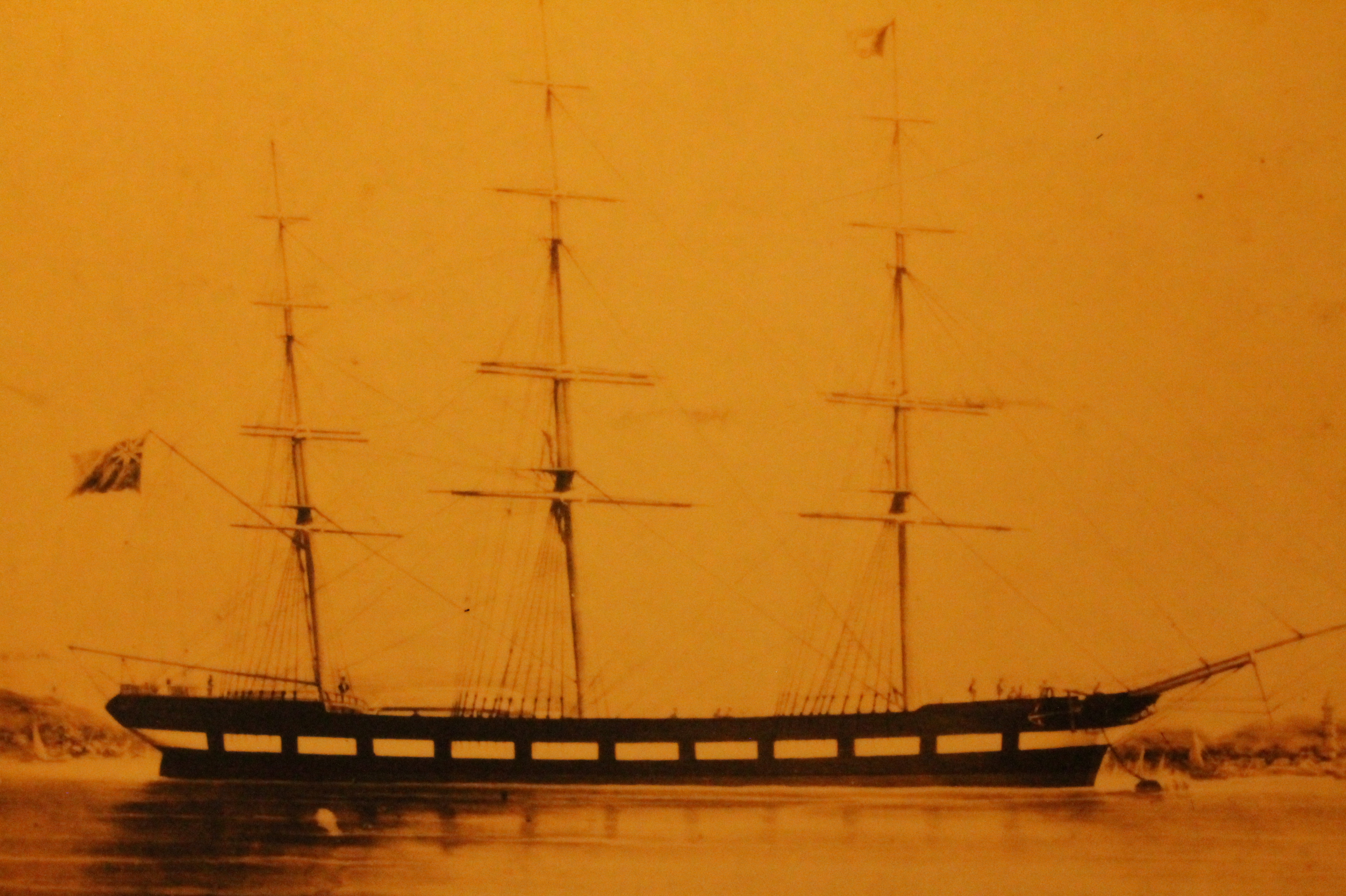
Reindeer, built by Alexander Hall & Sons

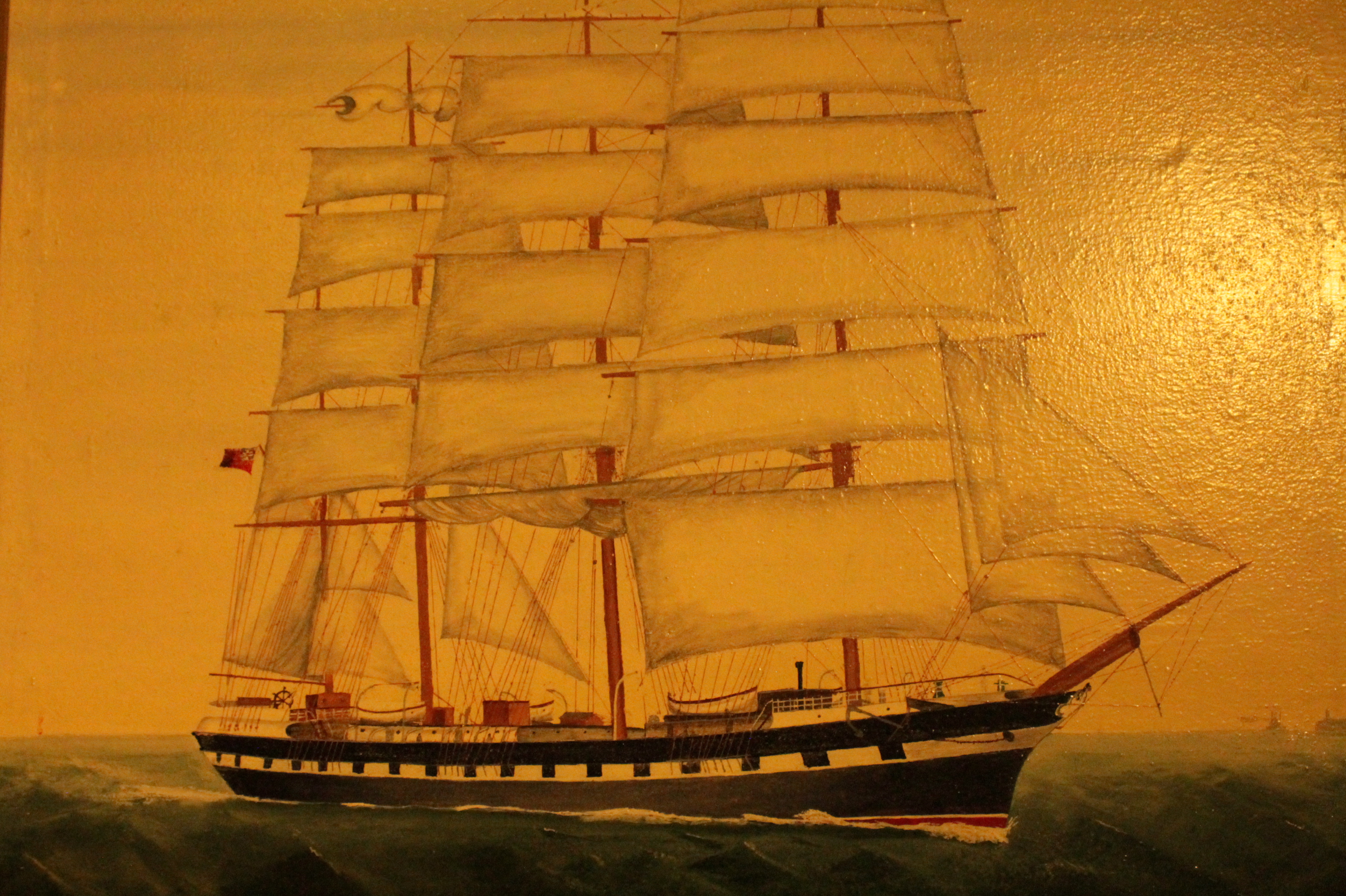
Port Jackson, built by Alexander Hall & Sons in 1882

Alexander Hall (1760–1849) was born in Auchterless, moved to Aberdeen in 1783 and took over his father-in-law’s shipbuilding business Cochar and Gibbon in 1790 to found Alexander Hall and Company. The first ships he built were wooden sailing vessels. A schooner built in 1839, The Scottish Maid, was the first to use the "Aberdeen bow", which was designed to improve speed and performance.

When he died in 1849, Alexander Hall left the shipyard to his sons James and William. William took charge of ship design and James ran the business. They built many famous clippers, including Torrington in 1845 and Stornoway in 1850, used on the opium and tea routes.

One ship later developed was the Ihoshu Maru, a barque-rigged steamship, built in the 1860s for the Imperial Japanese Navy. This vessel carried a belt of iron armour plating at the waterline together with eight 64 pounder and two 100 pounder guns. James suffered a fatal heart attack when a fire broke out in the yard during the ship's construction.

Before the end of the 1870s, the firm had built 290 sailing ships.

The firm built steamships as well as sailing ships. It built its first marine steam engine in 1887, and installed it in the launch Petrel. It built its first trawler, Maggie Walker, in 1888, followed by more trawlers, coasters, tugs and dredgers. In World War II Hall built 26 steam tugs, a large number being supplied to the Admiralty.

The firm became deeply involved with the welfare of its employees, starting a medical fund in 1846 which took care of sick pay, medical attention and medication, and met funeral expenses.

Failure to modernise and adapt after the war caused a decline in Hall's fortunes and in 1957 Hall, Russell & Company took over the company. Hall, Russell became part of British Shipbuilders in 1977. In the latter years the yard focused on ship repair work.

== Legacy ==
A&P Appledore bought Alexander Hall's former shipyard. It closed in 1992 and was replaced by River Dee Ship Repairers. Today the site is part of Telford Dock and now has a modern drydock belonging to Dales Marine Services Limited (founded 1987), a ship repair and maintenance facility.

== Ships built ==
- Asia (brig) (1818)
- Torrington (schooner) (1845)
- Reindeer (clipper) (1848)
- Stornoway (clipper) (1850)
- Mimosa (clipper) (1853)
- Robin Hood (clipper) (1856)
- Flying Spur (clipper) (1860)
- The Murray (clipper) (1861)
- The Goolwa (clipper) (1864)
- Ihoshu Maru (Japanese battleship) (1864)
- Sobraon (clipper) (1866)
- Un'yō (Japanese gunboat) (1870)
- Elissa (barque) (1877)
- Port Jackson (barque) (1882)
- HMS Glitter (1918)
- ST Challenge (tug) (1931)
- HMS Coltsfoot (K140) (1941)
- HMS Poppy (K213) (1941)
- ST Mies (tug) (1945)
- ST Cervia (tug) (1946)
