= List of shipwrecks in May 1846 =

The list of shipwrecks in May 1846 includes ships sunk, foundered, wrecked, grounded, or otherwise lost during May 1846.\

== 1 May ==
List of shipwrecks: 1 May 1846
Ship	State	Description
Erin	United Kingdom	The ship was wrecked on the Arklow Bank, in the Irish Sea off the coast of County Wicklow. Her crew survived. She was on a voyage from Liverpool, Lancashire to Barbados.
HSwMS Carlscrona	Swedish Navy	The corvette was wrecked at Matanzas, Cuba with the loss of 117 of the 133 people on board. She was on a voyage from Havana, Cuba to Sweden.
Ocean Queen	United Kingdom	The ship ran aground and was damaged in the Saint Lawrence River. She was on a voyage from Quebec City, Province of Canada, British North America to Liverpool.
Simpson	United Kingdom	The ship was abandoned off Dale, Pembrokeshire. Her crew were rescued by HMRC Skylark ( Board of Customs). She was subsequently taken in to Milford Haven, Pembrokeshire.

== 2 May ==
List of shipwrecks: 2 May 1846
Ship	State	Description
Eclair	Belgium	The ship was wrecked at Safi, Morocco. She was on a voyage from Mogadore, Morocco to Antwerp.
Florida	United Kingdom	The ship ran aground and was damaged at Carlisle, County Cork She was on a voyage from Cork to Newport, Monmouthshire. She was refloated and beached for repairs.
Margaret	United Kingdom	The ship was wrecked on Possession Island, Portuguese West Africa. Her crew were rescued.
St. Andrew	United Kingdom	The ship was driven ashore at Red Island, Newfoundland, British North America. She was on a voyage from the Clyde to Quebec City, Province of Canada, British North America. She was refloated on 9 May and towed in to Quebec City.

== 3 May ==
List of shipwrecks: May 1846
Ship	State	Description
Charles Kidd	United Kingdom	The ship was wrecked near Ringkøbing, Denmark with the loss of a crew member. She was on a voyage from Cardiff, Glamorgan to Saint Petersburg, Russia.
Halcyon	United Kingdom	The ship ran aground on the Gunfleet Sand, in the North Sea off the coast of Essex. She was on a voyage from London to Newcastle upon Tyne, Northumberland. She was refloated.
Speculation	United Kingdom	The ship ran aground near Snekkersten, Denmark. She was refloated and resumed her voyage. She subsequently put in to Jarrow, Northumberland for repairs.
Speed	United Kingdom	The schooner ran aground on the Knock Sand, in the North Sea off the coast of Lincolnshire. She was on a voyage from Newcastle upon Tyne, Northumberland to Boston, Lincolnshire. She was refloated and resumed her voyage.

== 4 May ==
List of shipwrecks: 4 May 1846
Ship	State	Description
Circe	United Kingdom	The ship ran aground and sank on the Long Sand, in The Wash. Her crew were rescued. She was on a voyage from Hartlepool, County Durham to King's Lynn, Norfolk.
Dolphin	(United Kingdom of Great Britain and Ireland) British North America	The schooner was sunk by ice in the Magdalen Islands, Nova Scotia.
Martha	United Kingdom	The ship was lost 200 nautical miles (370 km) off Torquay, Devon. Her crew were rescued. She was on a voyage from Lisbon, Portugal to London.
Seagull	(United Kingdom of Great Britain and Ireland) British North America	The schooner was sunk by ice in the Magdalen Islands.
Sea Star	(United Kingdom of Great Britain and Ireland) British North America	The schooner was sunk by ice in the Magdalen Islands.
Thomas Row	United Kingdom	The ship was driven ashore on Cape Sable Island, Nova Scotia, British North America. She was on a voyage from the Clyde to Quebec City, Province of Canada, British North America. She was refloated the next day and taken in to Harrington, Province of Canada.

== 5 May ==
List of shipwrecks: 5 May 1846
Ship	State	Description
Hoop Oldendorf	Hamburg	The ship struck the wrecked of the steamship Manchester (United Kingdom) and was wrecked off the coast of Dithmarschen, Duchy of Schleswig. Her crew were rescued. She was on a voyage from Hamburg to Königsberg, Prussia.

== 6 May ==
List of shipwrecks: May 1846
Ship	State	Description
Abraham Young	United Kingdom	The ship was severely damaged by ice off Scatterie Island, Nova Scotia, British North America.
Anna Louise	Prussia	The ship was driven ashore at Heringsdorf.
Druid	United Kingdom	The barque was abandoned in the Atlantic Ocean. All on board were rescued by Cove (United Kingdom). Druid was on a voyage rom Bristol, Gloucestershire to Quebec City, Province of Canada, British North America.
Fritz	Rostock	The ship was wrecked on a reef off Dragør, Denmark. She was on a voyage from Stettin to Glasgow, Renfrewshire, United Kingdom.
Glenalvon	United Kingdom	The ship was wrecked on the Arklow Bank, in the Irish Sea off the coast of County Wexford. Her crew were rescued. She was on a voyage from Liverpool, Lancashire to Cuba.
Hoop	Hamburg	The ship was wrecked at Tönning, Duchy of Holstein. She was on a voyage from Hambrug to Königsberg, Prussia.
Indian Queen	(United Kingdom of Great Britain and Ireland) British North America	The ship was driven ashore at Cocagne, New Brunswick. She was on a voyage from Quebec City, Province of Canada to Halifax, Nova Scotia.
Wetherall	United Kingdom	The ship was driven ashore at Cowes, Isle of Wight. She was refloated the next day and taken in to Cowes.

== 7 May ==
List of shipwrecks: 7 May 1846
Ship	State	Description
Clara	Sweden	The ship was driven ashore south of Helsingør, Denmark. She was refloated on 10 May and taken in to Helsingør for repairs.
Ellen Gorman	United Kingdom	The ship was wrecked off the Secadiva Atoll, Maldive Islands. Her crew were rescued. She was on a voyage from Mauritius to Madras, India.

== 8 May ==
List of shipwrecks: 8 May 1846
Ship	State	Description
Ann Grant	United Kingdom	The ship caught fire and was scuttled at Bombay, India. She was on a voyage from London to Cannanore, India.
William Rathbone	United Kingdom	The ship caught fire in the Atlantic Ocean. She sank the next day. Her crew were rescued by Agincourt (United Kingdom). William Rathbone was on a voyage from Calcutta, India to London.

== 9 May ==
List of shipwrecks: 9 May 1846
Ship	State	Description
Iris	United Kingdom	The ship was driven ashore at Gibraltar. She was on a voyage from Salem, Massachusetts, United States to Liverpool, Lancashire.
Margaret	United Kingdom	The ship struck the mast of a sunken vessel and was severely damaged at Runcorn, Cheshire.
Mary Catherine	United Kingdom	The barque was driven ashore at Kaipara Harbour, New Zealand. Her crew were rescued. She was on a voyage from Auckland to Kaipara Harbour.
Princess Alice Maude	United Kingdom	The ship was wrecked near Musquash, New Brunswick, British North America. Her crew were rescued. she was on a voyage from London to Saint John, New Brunswick.

== 10 May ==
List of shipwrecks: 10 May 1846
Ship	State	Description
Ann	(United Kingdom of Great Britain and Ireland) British North America	The ship was wrecked on the east point of Prince Edward Island. She was on a voyage from Havana, Cuba to Quebec City, Province of Canada.
Rosalind	United Kingdom	The ship ran aground on the Gronne Reef. She was on a voyage from Liverpool, Lancashire to Riga, Russia. She was refloated and resumed her voyage.
St. Martin	(United Kingdom of Great Britain and Ireland) British North America	The ship was wrecked on Brier Island, Nova Scotia. Her crew were rescued. She was on a voyage from London to Saint John, New Brunswick.

== 11 May ==
List of shipwrecks: 11 May 1846
Ship	State	Description
Corsair	United Kingdom	The ship was driven ashore in the Danube at Galatz Ottoman Empire. She was later refloated but was again driven ashore. Corsair was again refloated on 18 May and taken in to Galatz.
Emma	Greifswald	The ship struck a sunken rock and was damaged at Kleve, Duchy of Schleswig. She was on a voyage from Newcastle upon Tyne, Northumberland, United Kingdom to Greifswald.
St. Martin's	United Kingdom	The ship was wrecked on the west coast of Brier Island, Nova Scotia, British North America. Her crew were rescued. She was on a voyage from Liverpool, Lancashire to Saint John, New Brunswick, British North America.

== 12 May ==
List of shipwrecks: 12 May 1846
Ship	State	Description
Brilliant	United Kingdom	The ship was wrecked near Lamaline, Newfoundland, British North America with the loss of two lives; 153 people were rescued. She was on a voyage from Cork to Quebec City, Province of Canada, British North America.
Catharina	Kingdom of Hanover	The ship sank in the North Sea 6 nautical miles (11 km) off St. Abb's Head, Berwickshire, United Kingdom. Her crew were rescued. She was on a voyage from Grangemouth, Stirlingshire, United Kingdom to Rendsburg, Duchy of Schleswig.
Pekin	United Kingdom	The ship was wrecked in the Gulf of St Lawrence. She was on a voyage from Glasgow, Renfrewshire to Quebec City.

== 13 May ==
List of shipwrecks: May 1846
Ship	State	Description
Gaditano	UKGBI	The mistico was wrecked in the Islas Sisargas with the loss of all hands. She was on a voyage from Barcelona to A Coruña.
Glasgow Packet	United Kingdom	The ship struck a sunken rock in the Bay of Rugg and was severely damaged. She was on a voyage from Aberdeen to Glasgow, Renfrewshire. She put back to Aberdeen.
Linnet	United Kingdom	The ship foundered 12 nautical miles (22 km) east of the Mull of Galloway, Ayrshire. Her crew were rescued. She was on a voyage from Troon, Ayrshire to Marseille, Bouches-du-Rhône, France.

== 14 May ==
List of shipwrecks: 14 May 1846
Ship	State	Description
St. Martin's	(United Kingdom of Great Britain and Ireland) British North America	The ship was wrecked on the west coast of Brier Island, Nova Scotia. Her crew were rescued. She was on a voyage from Liverpool, Lancashire to Saint John, New Brunswick.

== 15 May ==
List of shipwrecks: 16 May 1846
Ship	State	Description
Spinster	United Kingdom	The ship was driven ashore and wrecked at "Porto Plata".

== 16 May ==
List of shipwrecks: 16 May 1846
Ship	State	Description
Bezaliel	United Kingdom	The ship was severely damaged at Palermo, Sicily.
British Queen	United Kingdom	The ship ran aground near Kronstadt, Russia. She was on a voyage from Messina, Kingdom of the Two Sicilies to Kronstadt, Russia. She was refloated.
Dart	United Kingdom	The ship was severely damaged at Palermo.
Elizabeth	United Kingdom	The ship was severely damaged at Palermo.
Fidelity	United Kingdom	The ship was driven ashore at the Mumbles, Glamorgan. She was refloated on 23 May.
Johanne Catherine	Sweden	The ship was lost near the Sunk Sand, in the North Sea. Her crew were rescued. She was on a voyage from Nyköping to London, United Kingdom.
Shepherd	United Kingdom	The ship ran aground on the Scroby Sands, Norfolk. She was refloated and taken in to Great Yarmouth the next day.

== 17 May ==
List of shipwrecks: 17 May 1846
Ship	State	Description
Dart	United Kingdom	The ship was driven ashore at Teignmouth, Devon. She was on a voyage from Neath, Glamorgan to Teignmouth. She was refloated on 21 May and taken in to Teignmouth.
Emily	(United Kingdom of Great Britain and Ireland) South Australia	The cutter departed from Port Phillip for Circular Head, Van Diemen's Land. No further trace, presumed foundered with the loss of all hands.
Erminio	Ottoman Empire	The ship was lost off Cape Santa Maria, Portugal. She was on a voyage from the Gulf of Saros to Amsterdam, North Holland, Netherlands.
Marshall Bennett	United Kingdom	The ship caught fire at Liverpool, Lancashire and was scuttled.

== 18 May ==
List of shipwrecks: 18 May 1846
Ship	State	Description
Alexander	United Kingdom	The ship was abandoned in the Atlantic Ocean. Her crew were rescued by the brig Royal William (United Kingdom). Alexander was on a voyage from Great Yarmouth, Norfolk to Quebec City, Province of Canada, British North America.
Ann	United Kingdom	The ship was holed by a pile and sank at Sutton Bridge, Lincolnshire. She was on a voyage from Sutton Bridge to Stockton-on-Tees, County Durham.
Ardjoena	Netherlands	The ship was driven ashore and wrecked in Bridport Bay. Her crew were rescued. She was on a voyage from Rotterdam, South Holland to Batavia, Netherlands East Indies.
Hope	United Kingdom	The ship was driven ashore and damaged at Burnham Overy Staithe, Norfolk.
Pandora	United Kingdom	The ship was wrecked on Taylor's Bank, in Liverpool Bay. Her crew were rescued. She was on a voyage from Waterford to Liverpool, Lancashire. Pandora was refloated on 26 May and taken to the River Mersey in a severely damaged condition.

== 19 May ==
List of shipwrecks: 19 May 1846
Ship	State	Description
Ammon	United Kingdom	The ship sprang a leak and was beached at Smerwick, County Kerry. She was on a voyage from Port Madoc, Caernarfonshire to Sligo.
Lord Vernon	United Kingdom	The ship was driven ashore at Dawlish, Devon. She was refloated on 22 May and taken in to Torquay.
Oscar	Denmark	The ship ran aground and was damaged in the English Channel between Littlehampton and Worthing, Sussex, United Kingdom. She was taken in to Shoreham-by-Sea Sussed with the assistance of the Coast Guard. Oscar was on a voyage from "Aviza" to Helsingør.
Sisters	United Kingdom	The ship ran aground and sank in the River Annan. She was on a voyage from Glasgow, Renfrewshire to Annan, Dumfriesshire.

== 20 May ==
List of shipwrecks: 20 May 1846
Ship	State	Description
Alert	United Kingdom	The ship ran aground on the Longsand, in the North Sea off the coast of Essex. She capsized the next day with the loss of nine of the fifteen people on board. Survivors were rescued by the smack William and Elizabeth (United Kingdom). Alert was on a voyage from Porto, Portugal to Whitby, Yorkshire. She was towed in to Harwich the next day.
Grouville	United Kingdom	The ship was damaged by fire at London, United Kingdom.
Hawk	United Kingdom	The ship ran aground on the Scroby Sands, Norfolk. She was on a voyage from Montrose, Forfarshire to London. She was refloated and taken in to Great Yarmouth, Norfolk.
John and Mary	United Kingdom	The ship was driven ashore near Pembrey, Glamorgan.
Margaret and Rachel	United Kingdom	The ship ran aground on the Nore. She was on a voyage from Liverpool, Lancashire to London.

== 21 May ==
List of shipwrecks: 21 May 1846
Ship	State	Description
Eleanor	(United Kingdom of Great Britain and Ireland) New South Wales	The whaler, a brig, was wrecked on Youell's Reef. Her crew were rescued by Anna Louisa (United Kingdom).
Squatter	(United Kingdom of Great Britain and Ireland) New South Wales	The ship, a brigantine or schooner, was wrecked 3 nautical miles (5.6 km) west of Port Fairy. All fourteen people on board survived. She was on a voyage from Sydney to Melbourne and Portland Bay.
Tantivy	United Kingdom	The ship struck a sunken rock and foundered off Ramsey Island, Pembrokeshire. Her crew were rescued. She was on a voyage from the Clyde to Bristol, Gloucestershire.
Victoria	United Kingdom	The brig sprang a leak whilst on a voyage from Nassau, Bahamas to New Orleans, Louisiana, United States. She put in to Key West, Florida, United States where she was condemned.

== 22 May ==
List of shipwrecks: 22 May 1846
Ship	State	Description
Dion	Spain	The brig was in collision with Clara (United States) and sank in the Atlantic Ocean (30°35′N 74°00′W). Her crew were rescued by Clara. Dion was on a voyage from Havana, Cuba to Mallorca.
Ivan	Russia	The ship foundered off Cape de Gatt, Spain. Her crew were rescued by Æolus (flag unknown).
Johanna Maria	Denmark	The schooner was driven ashore at Cuxhaven. She was on a voyage from Hartlepool, County Durham, United Kingdom to Altona. She was refloated on 25 May and taken in to Hamburg.
John Pirie	United Kingdom	The ship was wrecked on a reef off the coast of Patagonia, Argentina.
Swan	Russia	The ship foundered off Cape de Gatt, Spain. Her crew were rescued by Æolus (United Kingdom).

== 24 May ==
List of shipwrecks: 24 May 1846
Ship	State	Description
Eliza and Mary	United Kingdom	The ship was driven ashore at Flamborough Head, Yorkshire. She was refloated and resumed her voyage.
Gipsey	United Kingdom	The ship was driven ashore at Flamborough Head. She was refloated and resumed her voyage.
Gipsy	United Kingdom	The ship was driven ashore at Flamborough Head. She was refloated and resumed her voyage.
Konohassett	United States	The Boston whaler Konohassett (a converted merchant ship) under Captain Worth, struck at night the unmarked reef near Lisianski Island (Pell's Island). The crew took to the boats and in the morning from the mizzen of the wreck they spied land 17 miles away. On reaching it they found the remains of Holder Bolden and realised they would have to emulate that crew. They salvaged sufficient materials to make a boat to sail to the Hawaiian Islands. They completed her in only 18 days and sailed on 20 June. The seven men arriving in Hawaii on 31 July, after 42 days at sea. The American Consul was loaned the schooner Haalilio (United States) to recover the remaining 26 crew, who were landed at Honolulu in mid-September.

== 25 May ==
List of shipwrecks: 25 May 1846
Ship	State	Description
Cheval Marinda	France	The ship was run down and sunk in the Mediterranean Sea 45 nautical miles (83 km) off Cape Lardier, Var. Her crew were rescued.
Rambler; Sea Nymph	United Kingdom	The paddle steamers collided in the River Mersey. Twenty-one people were killed with Rambler sinking. Survivors from Rambler were rescued by the Magazines Lifeboat. Rambler was on a voyage from Sligo to Liverpool, Lancashire. She was refloated on 26 May and taken in to Liverpool. She was repaired only to be lost on her next voyage. Sea Nymph was on a voyage from Liverpool to Newry, County Antrim. She put back to Liverpool in a severely damaged condition.
Yare	United Kingdom	The ship was wrecked on the Cobblers, off Barbados. Her crew were rescued.

== 26 May ==
List of shipwrecks: 26 May 1846
Ship	State	Description
Clarisse	France	The brig foundered in the Mediterranean Sea off Cape de Gatt, Spain. Her crew were rescued by Halvor (flag unknown).
Jacob	Netherlands	The ship was driven ashore at Peterhead, Aberdeenshire, United Kingdom.
Trinity	(United Kingdom of Great Britain and Ireland) Gibraltar	The steamship tug caught fire and sank at Gibraltar.

== 27 May ==
List of shipwrecks: 27 May 1846
Ship	State	Description
Bombay Castle	United Kingdom	The ship was destroyed by a fire and explosion at "Saugor", India. All on board were rescued.
Louisa	United Kingdom	The ship struck the pier and sank at Shoreham-by-Sea, Sussex.
Speedwell	United Kingdom	The ship ran aground on The Shingles, off the Isle of Wight. She was on a voyage from Newcastle upon Tyne, Northumberland to Salcombe, Devon. She was refloated and resumed her voyage.

== 28 May ==
List of shipwrecks: 28 May 1846
Ship	State	Description
Calcutta	United Kingdom	The ship was wrecked at Metis, Province of Canada, British North America. The wreck was refloated in September and towed in to Quebec City, Province of Canada, arriving on the 7th.
George	France	The barque was wrecked off Rodrigues. Her crew were rescued. She was on a voyage from "Sonapere" to the Île Bourbon.
Hoffnung	Kingdom of Hanover	The ship was wrecked in the Jade Bight. Her crew were rescued. She was on a voyage from Newcastle upon Tyne, Northumberland, United Kingdom to Varel.
Pekin	United Kingdom	The ship was driven ashore at Fox River, Nova Scotia, British North America. She was on a voyage from Greenock, Renfrewshire to Quebec City, Province of Canada.

== 29 May ==
List of shipwrecks: 29 May 1846
Ship	State	Description
Emulation	France	The brig ran aground on the Long Sand, in the North Sea off the coast of Essex, United Kingdom. She was on a voyage from Marseille, Bouches-du-Rhône to South Shields, County Durham, United Kingdom. She was refloated and resumed her voyage.
Providence	United Kingdom	The ship ran aground at Portneuf, Province of Canada, British North America. She was on a voyage from Plymouth, Devon to Quebec City, Province of Canada. Providence was refloated on 12 June and towed in to Quebec City.
Victorieux	France	The ship ran aground on the Sunk Sand, in the North Sea off the coast of Essex. She was on a voyage from Sunderland, County Durham to Nantes, Loire-Inférieure. She was refloated and taken in to Wivenhoe, Essex.

== 30 May ==
List of shipwrecks: 30 May 1846
Ship	State	Description
Antina	Netherlands	The tjalk was wrecked on the Vogel Sand, in the North Sea. Her crew were rescued. She was on a voyage from Harwich, Essex, United Kingdom to Hamburg.
Norma	United States	The steamship sprang a leak and sank in Mobile Bay.

== 31 May ==
List of shipwrecks: 31 May 1846
Ship	State	Description
Agincourt	United Kingdom	The ship was driven ashore at Dungeness, Kent. She was on a voyage from Madras, India to London. She was refloated.

== Unknown date ==
List of shipwrecks: Unknown date in May 1846
Ship	State	Description
Aden	United Kingdom	The ship was scuttled and abandoned before 8 May. Her crew were rescued. She was on a voyage from Montevideo, Uruguay to Hamburg.
Adler	Hamburg	The ship was scuttled before 8 May. Her crew were rescued by HMS Philomel (Royal Navy). Adler was on a voyage from Montevideo, Uruguay to Hamburg. Her crew alleged barratry against her captain, who jumped overboard from HMS Philomel and was drowned.
Alexander	United Kingdom	The ship was abandoned in the Atlantic Ocean before 23 May.
Bella Clara	United Kingdom	The ship was abandoned in the Atlantic Ocean (5°21′S 22°31′W). Her crew were rescued.
Catherine	(United Kingdom of Great Britain and Ireland) British North America	The ship foundered in the Atlantic Ocean. All 36 people on board were rescued by Braeus (flag unknown). Catherine was on a voyage from Halifax, Nova Scotia to Liverpool, Lancashire.
Circa	United Kingdom	The ship sank off King's Lynn, Norfolk. She had been refloated by 11 May and taken in to King's Lynn.
Cologne	France	The whaler was wrecked on the south coast of Banks Peninsula, New Zealand, in late May. Two men drowned, and two others died attempting to walk to Akaroa to get assistance.
Columbine	United Kingdom	The ship was driven ashore on "Coutali Island", Ottoman Empire before 6 May. She was on a voyage from Odesa to Constantinople, Ottoman Empire. She was refloated and taken in t Gallipoli in a leaky condition.
Dolphin	(United Kingdom of Great Britain and Ireland) British North America	The schooner was lost in ice off the Magdalen Islands, Nova Scotia.
Ellison	United Kingdom	The ship was wrecked on Ship Island, Patagonia, Argentina before 10 May.
Halcyon Trader	United Kingdom	The ship ran aground on the Gunfleet Sand, in the North Sea off the coast of Essex. She was on a voyage from London to Newcastle upon Tyne, Northumberland. She was refloated.
Hugh Wallace	United Kingdom	The ship was sunk by ice. Her crew took to the boats and were rescued by Lord Metcalfe (United Kingdom).
HNLMS Kameleon	Royal Netherlands Navy	The schooner was attacked by pirates off the coast of Bangka Island, Netherlands East Indies. Her crew were massacred and the ship was sunk.
Lady Alice Lambton	United Kingdom	The brig foundered in the Mediterranean Sea. Her crew were rescued.
Miguela	United States	The barque was abandoned in the Atlantic Ocean before 21 May.
Pactolus	United Kingdom	The ship was driven ashore near Trelleborg, Sweden. She was on a voyage from Sunderland, County Durham to Saint Petersburg, Russia. She was refloated and taken in to Helsingør, Denmark for repairs She arrived on 15 May.
Pallas	United Kingdom	The ship departed from Cochin, for Calcutta, India. No further trace, presumed foundered with the loss of all hands.
Perthshire	United Kingdom	The ship was holed by ice and was beached on "Sanerins Island", Nova Scotia. She was refloated and take in to Arichat, Nova Scotia in a waterlogged condition. She was on a voyage from Savannah, Georgia, United States to Pictou, Nova Scotia.
Sea Gull	(United Kingdom of Great Britain and Ireland) British North America	The schooner was lost in ice off the Magdalen Islands.
Sea Star	United Kingdom	The schooner was lost in ice off the Magdalen Islands.
Trinidad	(United Kingdom of Great Britain and Ireland) British North America	The ship sprang a leak and was abandoned in the Atlantic Ocean. Her crew were rescued by the schooner Pink (United States). Trinidad was on a voyage from Saint Andrews, New Brunswick to Liverpool.
Uncle Sam	(United Kingdom of Great Britain and Ireland) New Zealand	The schooner wrecked on a reef off Māhia Peninsula, in Hawke Bay, New Zealand, while carrying mail from Wellington to Auckland. All hands were saved but the cargo was lost.
