= List of shipwrecks in June 1866 =

The list of shipwrecks in June 1866 includes ships sunk, foundered, grounded, or otherwise lost during June 1866.

== 1 June ==
List of shipwrecks: 1 June 1866
| Ship | State | Description |
|---|---|---|
| Lamartine | United Kingdom | The schooner was driven ashore at Sunderland, County Durham. Her crew were rescued. She was on a voyage from Dram, Norway to Sunderland. |
| Thirteen | United Kingdom | The brig was driven ashore at Kastrup, Denmark. She was on a voyage from Riga, Russia to London. She was refloated and taken in to Kastrup. |

== 2 June ==
List of shipwrecks: 2 June 1866
| Ship | State | Description |
|---|---|---|
| Lady Berriedale | United Kingdom | The ship ran aground on the Whitby Rock and sank. She was on a voyage from Shanghai, China to London. She was refloated on 14 July and taken in to Whitby, Yorkshire, where she sank. |

== 3 June ==
List of shipwrecks: 3 June 1866
| Ship | State | Description |
|---|---|---|
| Arne | Stettin | The brig was driven ashore at Swinemünde, Prussia. She was on a voyage from Stettin to London, United Kingdom. She was refloated and taken in to Swinemünde. |
| Electra | United Kingdom | The ship ran aground off Great Yarmouth, Norfolk. She was refloated and taken in to Great Yarmouth. |
| Glengarnock | United Kingdom | The barque was wrecked in the Abaco Islands. Her crew were rescued. She was on a voyage from Greenock, Renfrewshire to Cárdenas, Cuba. |
| Mary Clark | United Kingdom | The ship ran aground on the Swinebottoms, in the Baltic Sea. She was on a voyage from Sunderland, County Durham to Kronstadt, Russia. She was refloated. |
| Pandora | United Kingdom | The schooner foundered off Land's End, Cornwall. Her five crew survived. She was on a voyage from Neath, Glamorgan to Le Tréport, Seine-Inférieure, France. |

== 4 June ==
List of shipwrecks: 4 June 1866
| Ship | State | Description |
|---|---|---|
| Artisan | United States | The clipper was struck by lightning, caught fire and sank at New Orleans, Louisiana. |
| Guinevere | United Kingdom | The ship was wrecked in the Yangtze downstream of Hankow, China. |
| Julia | United Kingdom | The ship ran aground on the Haisborough Sands, in the North Sea off the coast of Norfolk and was abandoned by her crew. She was on a voyage from London to South Shields, County Durham. She was taken in to Great Yarmouth, Norfolk on 6 June by two smacks. |
| Terrier | United Kingdom | The ship was driven ashore and sank at Whitburn, County Durham. |
| Unnamed | Flag unknown | The schooner collided with the steamship Mary Nixon (United Kingdom) and sank in the Bristol Channel with the loss of all hands, at least three lives. |

== 5 June ==
List of shipwrecks: 5 June 1866
| Ship | State | Description |
|---|---|---|
| Agnes | United Kingdom | The schooner ran aground off Newport, Fife. She was on a voyage from Dundee, Forfarshire to an English port. She was refloated and beached. |
| Fleetwing | United Kingdom | The ship was driven ashore in Griffin's Cove. She was on a voyage from Glasgow, Renfrewshire to Quebec City, Province of Canada, British North America. She was consequently condemned. |

== 6 June ==
List of shipwrecks: 6 June 1866
| Ship | State | Description |
|---|---|---|
| Belle | United Kingdom | The schooner was driven ashore at Great Yarmouth, Norfolk. She was on a voyage from Montrose, Forfarshire to London. She was refloated and resumed her voyage. |
| Cleadon | United Kingdom | The ship ran aground on the Blakeney Overfalls, in the North Sea and sank. Her crew were rescued. She was on a voyage from Sunderland, County Durham to London. |
| C. S. Butler | United States | The steamship collided with Bertha (United States) off the Chapman Lighthouse, New York and was beached in the Mucking Bight. |
| Eliza Jane | United Kingdom | The ship ran aground on the Gunfleet Sand, in the North Sea off the coast of Suffolk. She was on a voyage from Padstow, Cornwall to London. She was refloated and assisted in to Harwich, Essex. |
| Joshua Carroll | United Kingdom | The ship ran aground at Teignmouth, Devon. She was refloated. |
| Maria | United Kingdom | The schooner ran aground on Scroby Sands Norfolk. She was refloated. |
| Neptunus | Rostock | The ship was driven ashore on Saltholm. She was on a voyage from Söderhamn, Sweden to Grangemouth, Stirlingshire, United Kingdom. She was refloated and taken in to Copenhagen, Denmark. |
| Unnamed | United Kingdom | The steamship ran aground on Scroby Sands. She was refloated. |

== 7 June ==
List of shipwrecks: 7 June 1866
| Ship | State | Description |
|---|---|---|
| Ann Sanderson | United Kingdom | The brig departed from Yokohama, Japan for San Francisco, California, United States. Believes to have subsequently foundered in a typhoon with the loss of all on board. |
| Cecilia | United Kingdom | The ship was driven ashore at Macduff, Aberdeenshire. She was refloated. |
| Celestine Marie | France | The schooner was driven ashore at "Port Fontaine", Seine-Inférieure. The sole crew member on board survived. She was on a voyage from Llanelly, Glamorgan, United Kingdom to Luçon, Vendée. |

== 8 June ==
List of shipwrecks: 8 June 1866
| Ship | State | Description |
|---|---|---|
| Anna | United Kingdom | The brigantine struck a sunken rock and was wrecked at Kinsale, County Cork. All ten people on board Were rescued by the Coastguard. She was on a voyage from Kinsale to Cardiff, Glamorgan. |

== 9 June ==
List of shipwrecks: 9 June 1866
| Ship | State | Description |
|---|---|---|
| Edgar | United Kingdom | The schooner was driven ashore and wrecked on "Ruberg". She was on a voyage from South Shields, County Durham to Gothenburg, Sweden. |

== 10 June ==
List of shipwrecks: 10 June 1866
| Ship | State | Description |
|---|---|---|
| Mary | United Kingdom | The ship was wrecked on the Middleton Shoal. She was on a voyage from Melbourne, Victoria to Shanghai, China. |
| Ocean Skimmer | United Kingdom | The ship was driven ashore at Cape Sestos, in the Dardanelles. She was on a voyage from Constanţa, Ottoman Empire to London. She was refloated with the assistance of a tug and resumed her voyage. |
| Triton | Flag unknown | The 140-ton brigantine was wrecked at Palliser Bay, New Zealand, while en route from Port Chalmers to Newcastle. |

== 11 June ==
List of shipwrecks: 11 June 1866
| Ship | State | Description |
|---|---|---|
| Eagle | United Kingdom | The steamship ran aground on a reef south of Læsø, Denmark. She was refloated but consequently foundered. All nineteen people on board took to three boats and reached the Cappger Ground Lightship (Denmark). Eagle was on a voyage from Aarhus, Denmark to Hull, Yorkshire. |

== 12 June ==
List of shipwrecks: 12 June 1866
| Ship | State | Description |
|---|---|---|
| Fairlight | United Kingdom | The ship was wrecked on "Po-Chung-Hian Island" with the loss of 144 lives. She was on a voyage from Hong Kong to San Francisco, California. |
| Marsella | United Kingdom | The brigantine foundered off the Copeland Islands, County Down. Her crew were rescued by the steamship Cognac (United Kingdom). Marsella was on a voyage from Llanelly, Glamorgan to Belfast, County Antrim. |

== 13 June ==
List of shipwrecks: 13 June 1866
| Ship | State | Description |
|---|---|---|
| Sarah | United Kingdom | The Mersey Flat sank on the West Hope Bank, in Liverpool Bay. |
| Venoge | Austrian Empire | The barque was wrecked on the Longsand, in the North Sea off the coast of Essex, United Kingdom. Her crew survived. She was on a voyage from Sulina, Ottoman Empire to Ipswich, Suffolk. |
| Two unnamed vessels | United Kingdom | The schooners ran aground on the Great Burbo Bank, in Liverpool Bay. Their crews were rescued by the Hoylake and Point of Ayr Lifeboats. |

== 14 June ==
List of shipwrecks: 14 June 1866
| Ship | State | Description |
|---|---|---|
| Flora | United Kingdom | The barque sprang a leak and was beached 12 nautical miles (22 km) south of Mari, Brazil. She was on a voyage from Uruguay to an English port. |
| Success | United Kingdom | The schooner was driven ashore at the Point of Ayr, Cheshire. |

== 15 June ==
List of shipwrecks: 15 June 1866
| Ship | State | Description |
|---|---|---|
| Severn | United Kingdom | The ship sank in the Atlantic Ocean. Her crew took to the boats; theye were rescued on 19 June by Arequipa (Brazil). Severn was on a voyage from London to Shanghai, China. Her owners and the ship's mate were charged with barratry in connection with the loss of Severn. It was alleged that holes had been deliberately bored in her hull and that the loss was insurance fraud. They were found guilty and sentenced to 20 years penal servitude each. |
| Tryton | (United Kingdom of Great Britain and Ireland) New Zealand | The ship was lost in Palliser Bay. She was on a voyage from Otago to Newcastle, New South Wales. |

== 16 June ==
List of shipwrecks: 16 June 1866
| Ship | State | Description |
|---|---|---|
| Bermondsey | United Kingdom | The ship sank off the Dudgeon Sand, in the North Sea off the coast of Norfolk. Her crew were rescued by Liberty (United Kingdom). Bermondsey was on a voyage from Sunderland, County Durham to Cartagena, Spain. |
| Galicia | United Kingdom | The steamship heeled over 13 nautical miles (24 km) off the coast of County Durham when her ballast shifted during her sea trials. She was beached at Hartlepool. Galicia was refloated with the assistance of a tug and taken in to Hartlepool. |
| Mary Roe | United Kingdom | The ship was driven ashore and wrecked at Cefn Sidan, Glamorgan. Her crew were rescued by the Carmarthen Bay Lifeboat City of Manchester ( Royal National Lifeboat Institution). Mary Roe was on a voyage from Liverpool, Lancashire to Halifax, Nova Scotia, British North America. |
| Telegraph | United Kingdom | The ship was wrecked on Cape Breton Island, Nova Scotia. Her crew were rescued. She was on a voyage from New Orleans, Louisiana, United States to Quebec City, Province of Canada, British North America. |

== 17 June ==
List of shipwrecks: 17 June 1866
| Ship | State | Description |
|---|---|---|
| Arabian | (United Kingdom of Great Britain and Ireland) | The barque was wrecked at Cleveland, Ohio, United States with the loss of five lives. She was on a voyage from Port Burwell to Darlington Province of Canada. |
| Dagmar | United Kingdom | The yacht was wrecked at Redcar, Yorkshire. Both crew were rescued by the Redcar Lifeboat Crossley ( Royal National Lifeboat Institution). |

== 18 June ==
List of shipwrecks: 18 June 1866
| Ship | State | Description |
|---|---|---|
| Edmiston Brothers | (United Kingdom of Great Britain and Ireland) British North America | The brig was wrecked at the Little River Head. She was on a voyage from Boston, Massachusetts, United States to Saint John, New Brunswick. |
| Guinevere | United Kingdom | The ship struck a sunken rock in the Yangtze 50 nautical miles (93 km) downstream of Hangkow, China and was wrecked. |

== 19 June ==
List of shipwrecks: 19 June 1866
| Ship | State | Description |
|---|---|---|
| Venus | United Kingdom | The ship ran aground off Zoutelande, Zeeland, Netherlands. She was on a voyage from Antwerp, Belgium to Sunderland, County Durham. She was refloated on 26 June. |

== 20 June ==
List of shipwrecks: 20 June 1866
| Ship | State | Description |
|---|---|---|
| Cawton | United Kingdom | The brig foundered in the English Channel off Dungeness, Kent. Her crew were rescued. She was on a voyage from Bideford, Devon to Newcastle upon Tyne, Northumberland. |
| Diamond | United Kingdom | The ship was wrecked off Jeddah, Habesh Eyalet. All on board, between 400 and 500 people, were rescued. She was on a voyage from Calcutta, India to Jeddah. |
| Fechamp | United Kingdom | The brig was driven ashore at Visby, Sweden. She was on a voyage from Kronstadt, Russia to London. |
| Maruccia Castellana | Italy | The brig foundered in the English Channel 20 nautical miles (37 km) off the coast of Seine-Inférieure, France. Her crew were rescued. |
| Telegraph | Denmark | The brig was driven ashore and wrecked at Galveston, Texas, United States. She was on a voyage from Newcastle upon Tyne to Galveston. |

== 21 June ==
List of shipwrecks: 21 June 1866
| Ship | State | Description |
|---|---|---|
| Lone Star | United Kingdom | The ship was wrecked near Nuevitas, Cuba. She was on a voyage from Cardiff, Glamorgan to Nuevitas. |
| Prince Jersey | United Kingdom | The schooner was wrecked off Possession Island with the loss of a crew member. |
| Scoresby | United Kingdom | The ship was abandoned off the Cape of Good Hope, Cape Colony. The 22 people on board took to the boats. Two people in the longboat were rescued on 7 July by John Stewart (United Kingdom). The rest were presumed lost. Scoresby was on a voyage from Colombo, Ceylon to London. |
| Shamrock | United Kingdom | The schooner ran aground and sank in the Solway Firth. Her crew were rescued. She was on a voyage from Maryport, Cumberland to London. |
| Sir Henry Parnell | United Kingdom | The steamship was wrecked at "Karingoen", Sweden. She was on a voyage from Helsingborg, Sweden to Hull, Yorkshire. |
| Stafford | United Kingdom | The ship was wrecked at Bombay, India. Her crew survived. She was on a voyage from Sunderland, County Durham to Bombay. |
| Vigilant | United Kingdom | The schooner was run down and sunk by the steamship Ems (United Kingdom) at Lowestoft, Suffolk. Her five crew were rescued by Ems. Vigilant was on a voyage from Newcastle upon Tyne, Northumberland to Totnes, Devon. |
| Wild Wave | (United Kingdom of Great Britain and Ireland) New Zealand | The schooner was caught in a strong gale in Pelorus Sound / Te Hoiere and capsized. Only two of the crew of seven survived. |

== 22 June ==
List of shipwrecks: 22 June 1866
| Ship | State | Description |
|---|---|---|
| Alfred | United Kingdom | The ship foundered 7 nautical miles (13 km) off East London, Cape Colony. Her crew survived. She was on a voyage from Bombay, India to London. |
| Annie | (United Kingdom of Great Britain and Ireland) New Zealand | The ketch was caught in a violent storm in Lyttelton Harbour. She broke her cables and was driven into rocks. |
| Baron Norway | United Kingdom | The barque was driven ashore at North Cape, Prince Edward Island, British North America. She was on a voyage from Shediac, New Brunswick, British North America to a French port. She was refloated and put in to Plaister Cove, Nova Scotia, British North America in a waterlogged condition. |
| Brothers | (United Kingdom of Great Britain and Ireland) New Zealand | The schooner was caught in a violent storm in Lyttelton Harbour. She broke her cables and was carried down harbour where she was driven onto rocks. |
| Donau | Norway | The schooner was driven ashore at Conigli, Lampedusa, Italy. She was on a voyage from an English port to Constantinople, Ottoman Empire. She was condemned. |
| Eliza Simpson | (United Kingdom of Great Britain and Ireland) New Zealand | The 53-ton schooner left Port Chalmers on and was not seen again. |
| Lady Franklin | (United Kingdom of Great Britain and Ireland) New Zealand | The 40-ton schooner left Port Chalmers on and was not seen again. |
| Stalwart | United Kingdom | The East Indiaman was abandoned in the Indian Ocean off the coast of the Cape Colony with the loss of at least twelve lives. Fourteen survivors were rescued by HMS Swallow (Royal Navy). Stalwart was on a voyage from Bombay to Liverpool, Lancashire. |
| Streamlet | (United Kingdom of Great Britain and Ireland) New Zealand | The schooner was caught in a violent storm in Lyttelton Harbour. She was driven onshore, hitting a large whaling boat en route, and was holed. When her cargo of lime made contact with the water, she caught fire. |

== 23 June ==
List of shipwrecks: 23 June 1866
| Ship | State | Description |
|---|---|---|
| Ann | United Kingdom | The schooner was sighted in The Downs whilst on a voyage from the River Tyne to Huelva, Spain. Presumed foundered with the loss of all seven crew; the stern of a boat washed up at Shoreham-by-Sea, Sussex. |
| Cashmere | United Kingdom | The ship was driven ashore on Red Island, Newfoundland, British North America. She was on a voyage from Bristol, Gloucestershire to Montreal, Province of Canada, British North America. She was later refloated and towed in to Quebec City, Province of Canada. |
| Lady Anne | United Kingdom | The ship was wrecked at Ängelholm, Sweden. |

== 24 June ==
List of shipwrecks: 24 June 1866
| Ship | State | Description |
|---|---|---|
| Agincourt | United Kingdom | The ship foundered in the Indian Ocean with the loss of her captain. She was on a voyage from Southampton, Hampshire to Hong Kong. |
| St. George | United Kingdom | The brig foundered in the Atlantic Ocean 20 nautical miles (37 km) off Madeira. (33°18′N 17°20′W). Her crew were rescued by RMS Macgregor Laird (United Kingdom). St. George was on a voyage from Liverpool, Lancashire to the west coast of Africa. |

== 25 June ==
List of shipwrecks: 25 June 1866
| Ship | State | Description |
|---|---|---|
| Elizabeth A. Oliver | United Kingdom | The ship ran aground on the Goodwin Sands, Kent. She was on a voyage from South Shields, County Durham to Kurrachee, India. |
| Gundagai | (United Kingdom of Great Britain and Ireland) New Zealand | The paddle steamer was wrecked at Pātea when she went ashore and broke her back. |
| M Castellana | Flag unknown | The ship foundered. She was on a voyage from Havre de Grâce, Seine-Inférieure, France to an English port. |
| Rachel | United Kingdom | The schooner was run down and sunk in the English Channel off the coast of Dorset by the steamship West of England (United Kingdom) with the loss of all hands, at least two lives. |
| Sheffield | United Kingdom | The steamship was driven onto rocks at Howth, County Dublin. She was refloated and taken in to Dublin in a waterlogged condition. |
| Water Lily | United Kingdom | The ship was driven ashore at Tenedos, Ottoman Empire. She was on a voyage from Newcastle upon Tyne, Northumberland to Constantinople, Ottoman Empire. She was refloated on 30 June and taken in to Constantinople for repairs. |

== 26 June ==
List of shipwrecks: 26 June 1866
| Ship | State | Description |
|---|---|---|
| Borromee | France | The barque ran aground on the Goodwin Sands, Kent, United Kingdom. She was on a voyage from Hamburg to Africa. She was refloated. |
| Don | United Kingdom | The steamship sank at Sunderland, County Durham. |

== 27 June ==
List of shipwrecks: 27 June 1866
| Ship | State | Description |
|---|---|---|
| Columbia | United Kingdom | The ship was wrecked on Duck Island. She was on a voyage from Boston, Massachusetts to Richibucto, New Brunswick, British North America. |
| Fanny Hamilton | United Kingdom | The barque was destroyed by fire at Gibraltar. She was on a voyage from Philadelphia, Pennsylvania, United States to Genoa, Italy. |
| Pedro | United States | The barque was driven ashore at "Magna". She was on a voyage from St. Jago de Cuba, Cuba to Swansea, Glamorgan, United Kingdom. |
| Yaratilda | United Kingdom | The clipper was abandoned in the Indian Ocean 200 nautical miles (370 km) south of Madagascar and 400 nautical miles (740 km) east of the Cape of Good Hope, Cape Colony. Her crew were rescued by Briar Hall (United Kingdom). Yaratila was on a voyage from London to Hong Kong. |

== 28 June ==
List of shipwrecks: 28 June 1866
| Ship | State | Description |
|---|---|---|
| Alberdina Edzina | Flag unknown | The ship ran aground between Inchkeith and the Herriot Rock. She was on a voyage from Narva, Russia to Leith, Lothian, United Kingdom. She was refloated and taken in to Leith. |

== 29 June ==
List of shipwrecks: 29 June 1866
| Ship | State | Description |
|---|---|---|
| Nipisiquit | United Kingdom | The ship foundered in the Atlantic Ocean. Her crew were rescued. |

== 30 June ==
List of shipwrecks: 30 June 1866
| Ship | State | Description |
|---|---|---|
| Albania | United Kingdom | The ship was driven ashore at Dunnet Head, Caithness. She was on a voyage from Bristol, Gloucestershire to Kronstadt, Russia. She was refloated the next day and taken in to Stromness, Orkney Islands. |
| Britannia | United Kingdom | The ship foundered in the Irish Sea off Little Orme Head, Caernarfonshire. Her crew were rescued. She was on a voyage from Liverpool, Lancashire to Pwllheli, Caernarfonshire. |
| Earl Grey | United Kingdom | The smack was wrecked at Saltcoats, Ayrshire. Her crew were rescued. She was on a voyage from Troon, Ayrshire to Loch Fyne. |
| Hilda | United Kingdom | The steamship ran aground at Berwick upon Tweed, Northumberland. She was on a voyage from Trondheim, Norway to Berwick upon Tweed. |
| Mazeppa | United Kingdom | The schooner was wrecked at Dunnet Head, Caithness. She was on a voyage from Ayr to Christiania, Norway. |
| Scarrish | United Kingdom | The schooner was driven ashore and wrecked in the Pentland Firth. Her crew were rescued She was on a voyage from Newcastle upon Tyne, Northumberland to Dublin. |

== Unknown date ==
List of shipwrecks: Unknown date in June 1866
| Ship | State | Description |
|---|---|---|
| Alfred | United Kingdom | The East Indiaman was wrecked on the coast of the Cape Colony. Her crew were rescued. |
| HMS Belleisle | Royal Navy | The hospital ship, a former Repulse-class ship of the line, ran aground in the River Thames. She was being towed from Chatham, Kent to London by the tug Medusa United Kingdom). She was refloated and the tow resuemed. |
| Colston | United Kingdom | The East Indiaman was wrecked on the coast of the Cape Colony. Her crew were rescued. |
| Constitution | United Kingdom | The ship ran aground at Saint John, New Brunswick, British North America. She was refloated on 25 June. |
| Cresswell | United Kingdom | The brig was driven ashore at the Pointe du Hoc, Calvados, France. |
| Cuba | United Kingdom | The ship ran aground off Nassau, Bahamas. |
| Exchange | United Kingdom | The ship was driven ashore at "Fakro". She was on a voyage from Kronstadt, Russia to London. She was refloated and taken in to "Slite". |
| Fi Wan | United Kingdom | The ship was wrecked on the Prince's Reef, in the Banda Strait before 20 June. Her crew were rescued. She was on a voyage from London to Shanghai, China. |
| J. S. de Wolf | United States | The ship was driven ashore at Ready Point. She was on a voyage from Liverpool, Lancashire, United Kingdom to Philadelphia, Pennsylvania. |
| Lady Ann Nelson | United Kingdom | The ship was wrecked at Ängelholm, Sweden. before 24 June |
| Mary Ann | United Kingdom | The schooner ran aground on the Longsand, in the North Sea off the coast of Essex. She was refloated with assistance from Aurora's Increase and Queen Victoria (both United Kingdom) and assisted in to Harwich, Essex. |
| Maude | United Kingdom | The brig was driven ashore in the Crooked Island Passage, Bahamas. |
| Oamaru | (United Kingdom of Great Britain and Ireland) New Zealand | The 25-ton schooner left Port Chalmers in June and was not seen again. |
| Salween | United Kingdom | The ship was driven ashore. She was on a voyage from Cuba to London. She was refloated and put in to Nassau, Bahamas, where she arrived on 10 June. |
| Two Sisters | (United Kingdom of Great Britain and Ireland) New Zealand | The cutter was lost off the Coromandel Peninsula. She stranded on rocks on 25 June, but was successfully refloated and continued her journey for Auckland. She was not sighted again, though wreckage was discovered near Whangapoua in early July. |
| Wigtownshire | (United Kingdom of Great Britain and Ireland) British North America | The full-rigged ship was destroyed by fire. She was on a voyage from Liverpoolto Panama City, United States of Colombia. |
| Wilhelmina | United Kingdom | The barque was driven ashore and wrecked at Arichat, Nova Scotia, British North America before 27 June. |
| Woodlands | United Kingdom | The ship was wrecked near Galveston, Texas, United States. Her crew survived. |
