= Duncan Dunbar (ship) =

1857 British clipper ship

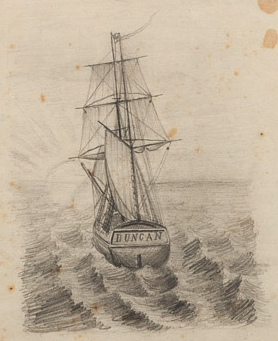
- "The clipper Duncan", by Ferdinand II of Portugal

History
- Name: Duncan Dunbar
- Owner: Gellatly, Hankey & Sewell
- Builder: James Laing, Sunderland, Tyne and Wear
- Launched: 18 May 1857
- Home port: London
- Fate: Wrecked, 7 October 1865

General characteristics
- Type: Clipper
- Tonnage: 1,447 tons
- Tons burthen: 2,500 tons bm
- Length: 260 ft (79 m) o/a; 229 ft 2 in (69.85 m) (keel)
- Beam: 36 ft 3 in (11.05 m)
- Depth of hold: 23 ft (7.0 m)
- Sail plan: Full-rigged ship

The Duncan Dunbar was a clipper constructed for Duncan Dunbar & Company in 1857. It was shipwrecked at the Rocas Atoll off the coast of Brazil on 7 October 1865 on the way to Sydney, Australia.

== Ship history ==
The ship was launched on 18 May 1857 from the yard of James Laing, Sunderland, Tyne and Wear. She was the twelfth ship built by Laing for Dunbar, and at the time the largest vessel ever launched on the Wear. She was constructed entirely of wood, with English oak frames and East India teak planking and masts. She was held together with copper bolts, with iron trusses and knees. Overall the ship was 260 feet (79 m) long, and 229 ft 2 in (69.85 m) at the keel. She had a beam of 36 ft 3 in (11.05 m) and a depth of hold of 23 ft (7.0 m). Her tonnage was given as 1,447 tons, with a burthen of 2,500 tons. A large crowd gathered to witness the launch, and the ship was christened by Mrs. W.R. Robinson of Silksworth. The ship was named either after Duncan Dunbar, the then owner of Duncan Dunbar & Co., or his father of the same name.

Under Dunbar's ownership the ship was engaged in the passenger and cargo trade between England and Australia. After Duncan Dunbar's death in 1862, the ship was sold to Gellatly, Hankey, Sewell & Co.

=== Sinking ===
A contemporary report states:

The ship left London, under Captain Swanson, on 28 August 1865 and Plymouth on 2 September 1865, with passengers and cargo for Sydney. On 7 October 1865 she was wrecked on the reef Las Roccas 03°52′S 33°45′W, on the coast of Brazil. She struck about 20:30. The Captain went in one of the boats to take soundings around her but she had gone aground at high tide. There were not enough boats to accommodate all the passengers and crew so he determined to wait until daylight to see if there was any dry land to which survivors could be taken by boat and raft. The passengers were in fear because the vessel was rolling heavily and striking violently with each roll. At daybreak on 8 October, the Captain succeeded in getting through the breakers to a landing place on one of the two sand islets which rose about 7 feet (2.1 m) above ordinary high-water mark. Preparations were at once made to transfer the passengers and crew to the spot, the passengers being lowered in a chair over the stern because it was impossible to keep a boat alongside due to the heavy rolling. By 07:00, all were landed. The islet was covered with pig-weed but there was no water so this was ferried from the wreck. Four of the five water-puncheons were lost, being stove-in by debris or having drifted away. There were 117 persons on the reef. For the first two days they had a pint of water each in temperatures of 112 °F (44 °C) degrees. A tent was constructed for shelter. The islet was infested with land-crabs and various vermin. They stayed on the islet for 10 days and during that period had recovered from the wreck sufficient water and stores to serve a hundred people for a hundred days. Captain Swanson had left, in the lifeboat, on 11 October 1865, to sail towards Pernambuco. After making 120 miles he was picked up by the American ship Hayara and dropped 15 miles from his destination. There, he procured the assistance of the Oneida, Royal Mail Steam Packet Company, which came to the island and took all hands safely to Southampton. The Captain remained in Pernambuco.

A different ship named the Dunbar was wrecked near Sydney in 1857. There is a description of the shipwreck of the Dunbar in Following the Equator, by Mark Twain. Twain incorrectly refers to the ship as the Duncan Dunbar.
