= Randolph (ship) =

English colonial transport ship

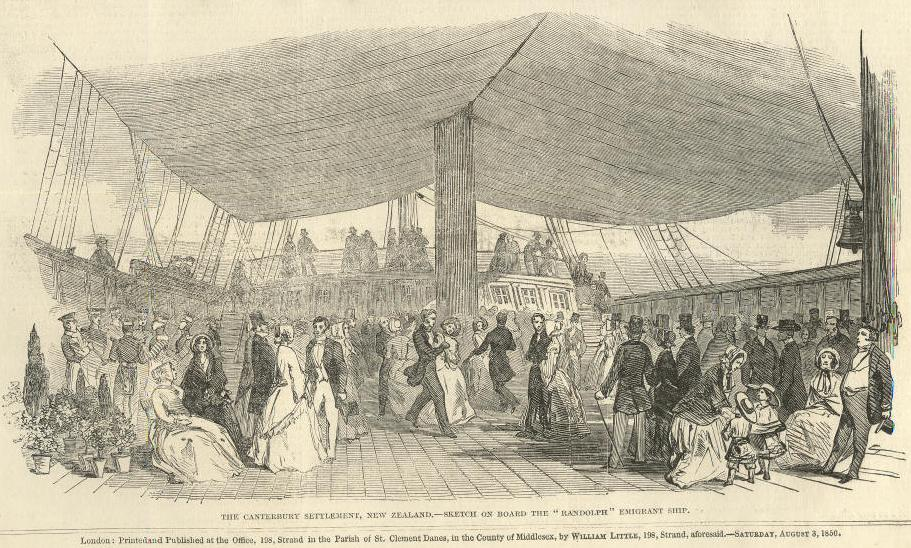
- Sketch on board the Randolph

History

United Kingdom
- Name: Randolph
- Owner: Duncan Dunbar
- Builder: James Laing
- Launched: 1849
- Fate: Wrecked on 25 June 1851

General characteristics
- Tons burthen: 664 (bm)
- Sail plan: Full-rigged ship

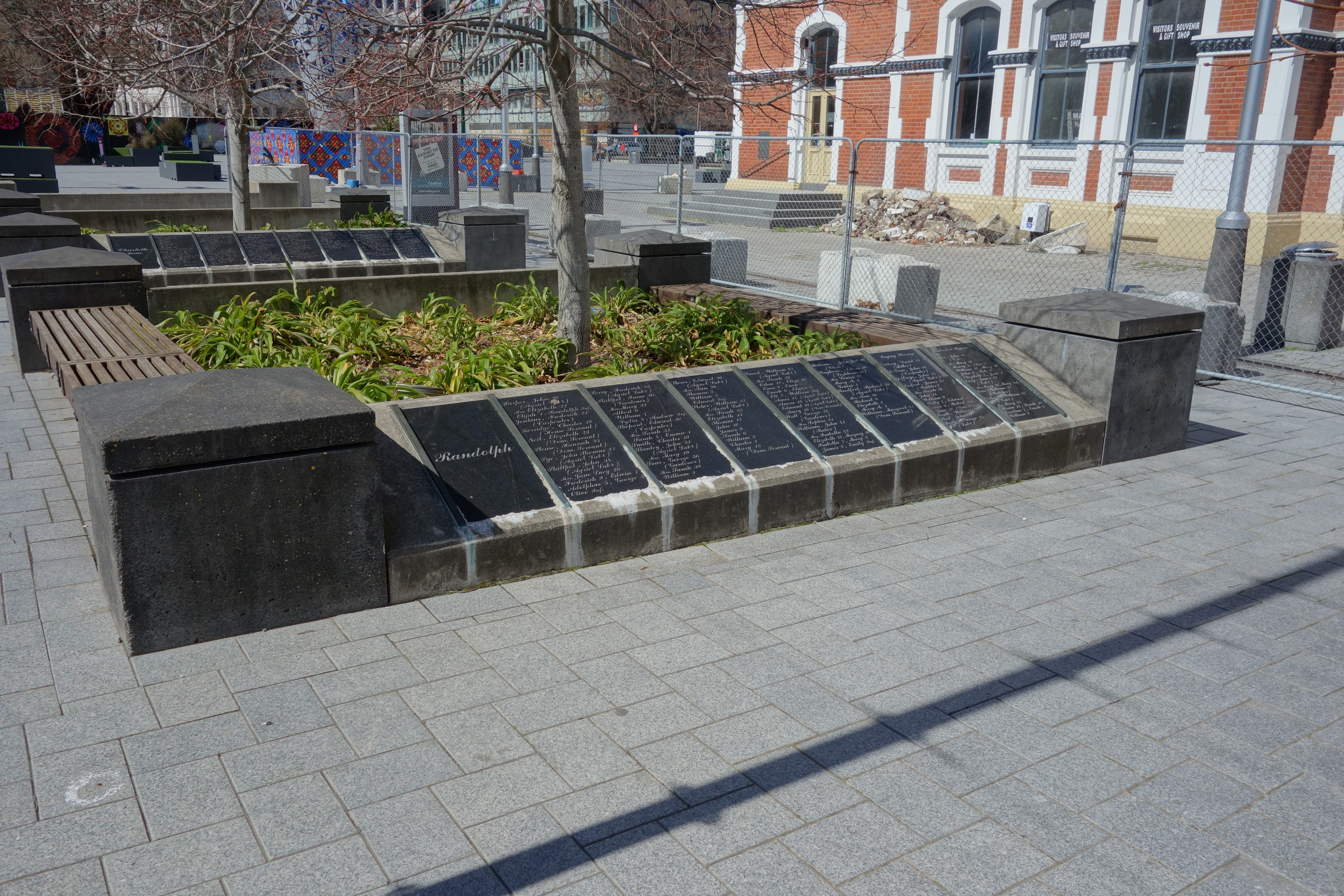
Randolph memorial in Cathedral Square in front of the former Chief Post Office

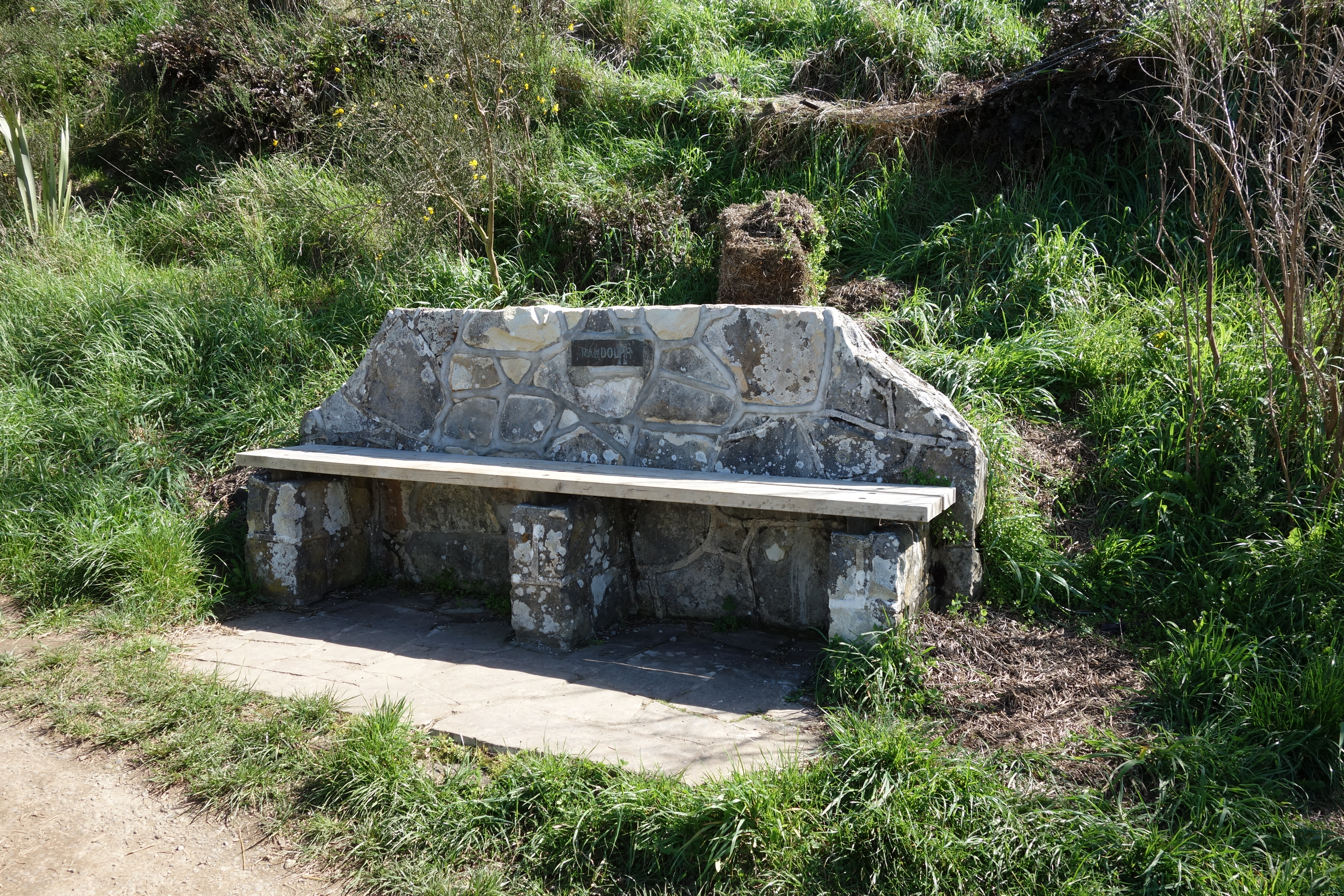
Commemorative seat on the Bridle Path

Randolph was a 664-ton ship-rigged merchant vessel constructed in 1849 in Sunderland. She was one of the First Four Ships that brought settlers to Christchurch, New Zealand.

Randolph was one of the many ships built by James Laing for Duncan Dunbar. The Canterbury Association chartered Randolph, with Captain William Dale serving as the ship's captain. Randolph left Gravesend on 4 September 1850, and Plymouth on the night of 7 September 1850. She arrived at Lyttelton 99 days later on 16 December 1850, with 34 cabin passengers, 15 intermediate and 161 steerage passengers.

She departed Port Victoria (Lyttelton) on 10 January 1851, bound for the "Straights of Lombok".

She was lost on 25 June 1851, on a reef off Amber Island, Mauritius. She had on board a cargo of sugar for London, a large amount of money, and 254 Indian emigrants for Port Louis. Nothing belonging to the vessel could be saved. Mr. Scott, an officer of the Madras Army, swam on shore, but died a moment after reaching it from exhaustion. Two European sailors, nine men (immigrants), ten women and three children were drowned.

Randolph's entry in Lloyd's Register for 1851 carries the annotation "Wrecked".

The ship is remembered in the name of a road, Randolph Terrace, in the port of Lyttelton. There are commemorative seats on the Bridle Path for the First Four Ships.
