= Agincourt (1844 ship) =

Ship launched at Sunderland in 1844

History

United Kingdom
- Name: Agincourt
- Namesake: Battle of Agincourt
- Owner: Duncan Dunbar (1845 – c. 1865)
- Builder: James Liang, Sunderland
- Launched: 19 January 1844
- Fate: Last listed 1886
- Notes: Bateson confuses this Agincourt with Agincourt

General characteristics
- Tons burthen: 543 (old) & 669 (new), or 561 (old) (bm)
- Length: 130 ft 0 in (39.6 m)
- Beam: 28 ft 0 in (8.5 m)
- Depth: 21 ft 1 in (6.4 m)
- Sail plan: 1844:Ship; 1855:Barque
- Notes: In 1862 she was sheathed in felt and Muntz metal

Agincourt was built by James Laing & Sons and launched at Sunderland in 1844. She immediately transported convicts to Norfolk Island. Thereafter she traded widely, sailing to Australia, Aden, and South America. Her homeport changed to Spain at some point prior to 1870 and thereafter Lloyd's Register carried stale data until it ceased listing her in 1886.

== Career ==
Origins: James Laing was aged 20 in 1843 when he took over his father's shipbuilding yard at Deptford. Agincourt was the first ship he launched. She was a full-rigged ship with imitation gunports. Her original name had been intended to be Abyssinia, but she was launched in 1844 for Duncan Dunbar as Agincourt. Laing went on to make some 30 vessels for Dunbar over the next 20 years.

Agincourt entered Lloyd's Register in 1844 with Neatby, master, Laing & Co., owner, and trade London–Sydney.

Convict transport (1844): Captain Henry Neatby, with Surgeon Charles Henry Fuller, sailed from Woolwich on 8 July 1844. Agincourt was at the Cape of Good Hope on 24 September and stayed there a week, taking on water. She arrived at Norfolk Island on 9 November. She had embarked 224 convicts and disembarked 220, three having died on the voyage. One may have escaped at the Cape.

Immigrant voyages: Agincourt also made numerous voyages carrying government-assisted or independent immigrants to Australia.

- Agincourt left Gravesend on 6 October 1849 and arrived at Port Adelaide on 31 January 1850. On this voyage she carried some 262 passengers. After delivering his passengers, Captain Cumberland carried a cargo to San Francisco. She arrived on 30 July after a voyage of 130 days from Adelaide. Her cargo consisted of seven houses, 220 bags flour, 18,750 bricks, 1,500 feet of pine, 50 tons of coal, and oats, hay, and assorted goods.
- Agincourt left Plymouth on 3 September 1855 and arrived at Port Adelaide on 3 December 1855
- Agincourt left London on 22 March 1862 and arrived at Port Adelaide on 20 July 1862.

== Ownership history ==
Dunbar, the first owner, died in 1862. William Henry Haynes then acquired Agincourt. He first sailed her out of London, and then moved her homeport to Liverpool. In 1878 Spanish owners acquired Agincourt. They continued to have her surveyed and registered in Britain, but did not provide information on masters or her trade.

== Lloyd's Register ==
Year	Master	Owner	Trade	Notes
1845	Neatby	Laing & Co.	London–Sydney	
1850	Scott	D. Dunbar	London–Sydney	
1855	Pasley	D. Dunbar	Southampton–Australia	
1860	E. Pashley	D. Dunbar	London	Large repair 1855
1865	C.Penrice	W.Hayne	London–Aden	Large repair 1855
1870	Williamson	W. Hayne	London–South America	Homeport Liverpool; damages repaired 1866
1875	Williamson	W. Hayne	London–South America	Homeport Liverpool; damages repaired 1866
1880				Homeport Spain; damages repaired 1866
1885				Homeport Spain; damages repaired 1866

== Fate ==
Agincourt was last listed in Lloyd's Register in 1886 with unchanged information since 1880.
