= Duncan Dunbar (shipowner) =

Scottish shipowner (1803–1862)

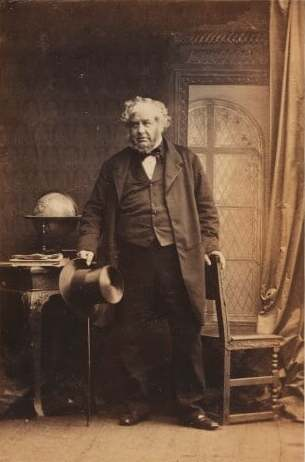
- Duncan Dunbar in January 1862, by Camille Silvy
- Born: September 1803; Limehouse, Middlesex
- Died: 6 March 1862 (aged 58); Paddington
- Occupation: shipowner

Duncan Dunbar (September 1803 – 6 March 1862) was a Scottish businessman and London-based shipowner who established what was described as the largest shipping line in Great Britain. He was also the first chairman and a founder of the London Chartered Bank of Australia.

== Early life ==
Dunbar was born in September 1803 at 7 Fore Street, Limehouse, Middlesex. His father, Duncan Dunbar senior, had moved to London in the 1790s and established a successful business as a brewer and wine merchant at Dunbar Wharf. Dunbar was 22 when his father died in 1825 and inherited the business with his brother John.

== Business ==
Dunbar possessed what was described as the largest sailing fleet in the world in the mid-19th century. Most of his ships were built in his own shipyard in Moulmein, Burma. He also founded the London Chartered Bank of Australia in 1852.

=== Ships ===
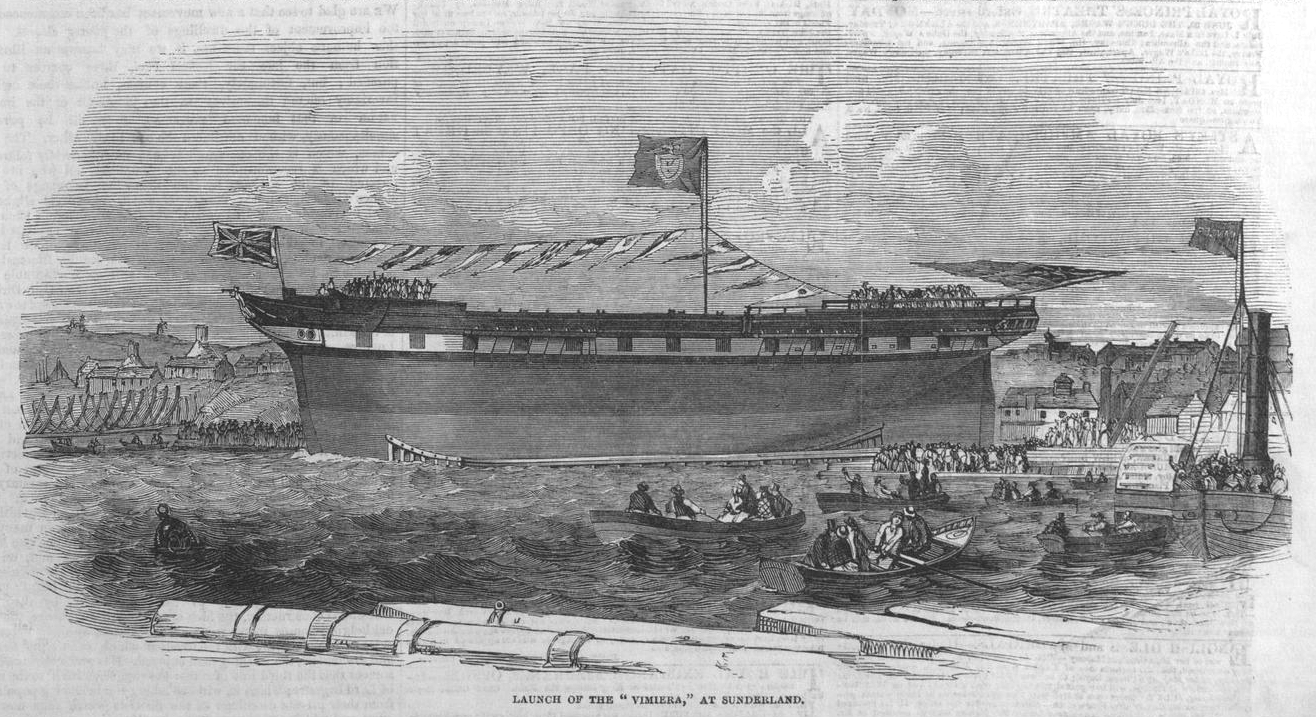
Launch of the Vimiera at Sunderland, 16 June 1851, built by James Laing

Duncan Dunbar owned a large fleet of sailing ships, which were employed in the New Zealand and Australian emigrant trades, the transportation of convicts, the carriage of cargo, and as troopships, including during the Crimean War. His vessels were built both in Britain and at his shipyard in Moulmein, Burma. A substantial part of his fleet was built at Sunderland by James Laing & Sons.

Dunbar was particularly active in the transportation of convicts to Western Australia. Twelve of the 33 ships that transported convicts there between 1850 and 1868 were owned by him. Ten of his vessels were chartered by the Admiralty for the transportation of convicts, carrying 2,235 men on eleven voyages. Six of these were built at Sunderland: Minden, Nile, Phoebe Dunbar, Pyrenees, Sultana, and the barque Ramillies.

==== Notable vessels ====
Vessel	Year	Builder	Association with Dunbar
Isabella	1818		Owned by Dunbar
Agincourt	1844	James Laing & Sons	Built for Dunbar; owned by him from 1845
Sea Park	1844	James Laing & Sons	Owned by Dunbar; transported convicts to Western Australia
Randolph	1849	James Laing & Sons	Built for and owned by Dunbar
Phoebe Dunbar	1850	James Laing & Sons	Built for Dunbar & Sons; named for his mother, Phoebe
Hougoumont	1852		Built for Dunbar
Dunbar	1853	James Laing & Sons	Built for Dunbar
Northfleet	1853		Built for Dunbar
La Hogue	1855	James Laing & Sons	Built for Dunbar
Cospatrick	1856		Built at Moulmein for Dunbar
Duncan Dunbar	1857	James Laing & Sons	Built for Duncan Dunbar & Co.

== Death ==
Dunbar House flag

Dunbar died at his home at Porchester Terrace, Paddington, on 6 March 1862 and was buried at Highgate Cemetery. Dunbar left £1,500,000 in his will. All 39 of his ships were sold within two years of his death. Dunbar was a Conservative and frequently declined offers of a seat in Parliament, saying that he was "much too busy"; he gave the same reason for remaining a bachelor.
