= Balnageith =

Archaeological site in Moray, Scotland

Coordinates: 57.5989°N 3.6337°W

Balnageith, located on the western edge of the suburbs of Forres in Moray, Scotland, is the site of an excavated linear cropmark with a rounded corner that has been interpreted as a possible Roman military camp or fort. The enclosure may originally have been of up to 2.4 hectares (5.9 acres) in size.

Blalnageith was the birthplace of Duncan Dunbar (senior) in the 1760s Dunbar moved to London and became a brewer in Limehouse, London.

Administrative Area:

- Council: Moray
- Parish: Forres

== Bibliography ==
- "Balnageith". Canmore. Royal Commission on the Ancient and Historical Monuments of Scotland.
- Gregory, Richard A. (2001). "Excavations by the late G D B Jones and C M Daniels along the Moray Firth littoral" (PDF). Proceedings of the Society of Antiquaries of Scotland. 131: 177–222.
