= SS Coylet =

History
- Name: War Rambler
- Owner: Shipping Controller, London
- Builder: James Laing (shipbuilder)
- Yard number: 669
- Launched: 26 October 1917
- In service: 1919
- Out of service: 1919
- Fate: Sold

History
- Name: Waziristan
- Owner: Common Bros. Ltd. - Hindustan S. S. Co. Ltd., Newcastle-Upon-Tyne.
- In service: 1919
- Out of service: 1920
- Fate: Sold

History
- Name: SS Coylet
- Owner: Thomas Dunlop & Sons
- In service: 1920
- Out of service: 1922
- Fate: Scuttled

General characteristics
- Class & type: WWI A-class standard cargo ship (br.)
- Type: Tanker
- Tonnage: 5495grt
- Length: 121.9m
- Beam: 16m
- Propulsion: 1 x 3 cyl. triple expansion engine, single shaft, 1 screw
- Speed: 11 knots
- Notes: Abandoned due to fire and scuttled.

SS Coylet was a World War I A-class standard cargo ship built by Laing James & Sons Ltd of Sunderland, United Kingdom for the Shipping Controller, London as War Rambler. The ship was launched on the 26 October 1917. She was built of steel and powered by a three cylinder triple expansion steam engine with a single shaft and one screw.

On 15 February 1922 she caught fire and after her crew were rescued by the SS Sucrosa she was shelled and sunk by the U.S. Coast Guard, 12 nautical miles (22 km) west south west of the Sand Key Lighthouse, Florida, United States. Her owner at the time of her scuttling was Thomas Dunlop & Sons, who had the ship refitted as a tanker.
