= Sea Park (ship) =

English sailing ship

History

United Kingdom
- Name: Sea Park
- Owner: Duncan Dunbar
- Builder: Laing, South Shields
- Launched: May 1844
- Identification: Official number 14738
- Fate: Lost at sea 13 July 1864

General characteristics
- Tonnage: 835 NRT
- Tons burthen: 682
- Length: Overall: 134.2 feet; Keel:
- Beam: 30.0 feet
- Draught: 22.4 feet
- Propulsion: Sail

Sea Park was a sailing ship of 835 Net register tons, built by James Laing & Co at Deptford Yard near South Shields, England, in 1845. The ship took its name from an estate in Morayshire which the owner's brother, John Dunbar, had purchased in 1838. In 1853, the vessel undertook a contract for the British Government, transporting 305 male convicts from London to Western Australia.

In 1854, the ship's owner was Duncan Dunbar, of London. It also operated as an emigrant ship, as its journey to South Australia in 1855 shows. Notably, on this voyage, the ship carried 165 single female passengers, out of the total of 278 passengers embarked. Later journeys are designated as normal without any specific purpose.

== Loss ==
Sea Park was purchased by Hargrove, Fergusson & Co., of Liverpool in 1863 and, following repairs in a graving dock, set off on what was to be its final voyage, transporting coal from Cardiff to Chile. The ship started taking in water soon after leaving Cardiff and had to put into Falmouth, where it was beached for repairs to the hull. Sea Park then continued its journey without major incident until it reached the South Atlantic, where the master became concerned about the rate at which water was seeping into the hull and decided to divert to Brazil. However, before it could reach land, the ship's pumps could not keep it afloat and so, on 13 July 1864, the ship was abandoned(25°13′S 40°58′W). Her crew took to three boats. The pinnace, commanded by the ship's mate, landed at Paranaguá, Brazil on 17 July. The twelve crew in the longboat and lifeboat were rescued by the Brazilian barque Fraternidade. News of the loss of the ship, and of the escape of the men in the pinnace, reached Liverpool before the fate of the other men, including the ship's master, were known.

The loss of the Sea Park was the subject of a court case in Liverpool in April 1865. One of the insurers had refused to pay their share of the insured loss on the grounds that the ship had not been seaworthy for a voyage to Chile with a cargo of coal. After considering evidence from numerous expert witnesses over two days, the jury rejected this argument and decided that the Sea Park had been seaworthy when it left England.
