= Isabella (1818 ship) =

Merchant ship

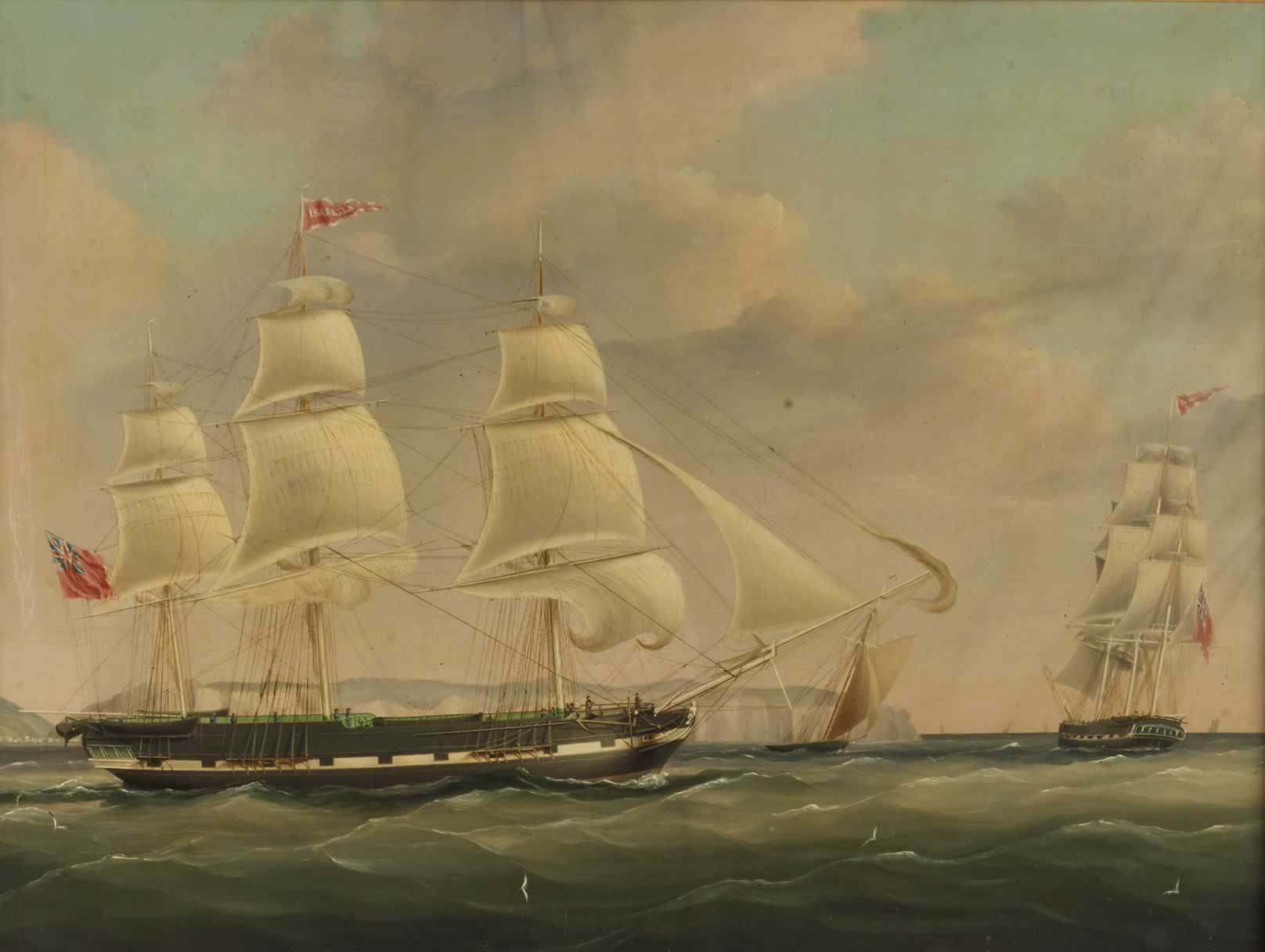
- File:The Ship Isabella

History

United Kingdom
- Name: Isabella
- Owner: Chalmers and Guthrie (1826)
- Builder: John Warwick, Rotherhithe
- Launched: 9 January 1818
- Fate: No longer in Lloyd's Register in 1851

General characteristics
- Tons burthen: 57923/94 (bm)
- Length: 122 ft 0 in (37.2 m)
- Beam: 32 ft 9 in (10.0 m)
- Propulsion: Sail

Isabella was a merchant ship built on the Thames, England, and launched in 1818. She made six voyages transporting convicts from England and Ireland to Australia. In between, she made one round trip to China for the British East India Company (EIC). From her launch to 1834 she traded with India and the Far East under a license from the EIC. From 1848 on served in the North America trade. She is last listed in 1850.

== Career ==
=== Convict voyage #1 (1818) ===
Under the command of Robert Berry and surgeon John Hallion, she left Spithead, England on 3 April 1818. She sailed via Rio de Janeiro and arrived in Sydney on 14 September. She embarked 230 male convicts and had three convict deaths en route. Isabella departed Port Jackson on 14 November bound for Batavia.

=== Convict voyage #2 (1821) ===
On her second convict voyage under the command of John Wallis and surgeon William Price, she left Cork, Ireland on 4 November 1821, arrived in Sydney on 9 March 1822. She had embarked 200 male convicts and had no convict deaths en route. Also aboard were the first European bees to be successfully acclimatised in Australia. Isabella departed Port Jackson on 11 April, bound for South America.

=== Convict voyage #3 (1823) ===
Her next convict voyage occurred under the command of John Wallis and surgeon William Rae. Isabella left Cork, Ireland in August 1823. An early outbreak of scurvy and a plot to cause a mutiny was put down during the voyage, and she arrived in Sydney on 16 December. She embarked 201 male convicts and had five convict deaths en route. Isabella departed Port Jackson on 18 January 1824, bound for Batavia.

=== Voyage to China for the EIC (1826 - 1827) ===
Captain William Wiseman sailed from The Downs on 1 July 1826, bound for China. Isabella arrived at Whampoa on 24 December. Homeward bound, she crossed the Second Bar on 10 February 1827, reached St Helena on 26 April, and arrived at The Downs on 3 June.

=== Convict voyage #4 (1831) ===
On her fourth convict voyage under the command of William Wiseman and surgeon Thomas Galloway, she left Plymouth, England on 27 November 1831. A revolt by the seamen was put down during the voyage and she arrived in Sydney on 15 March 1832. She embarked 224 male convicts and had no deaths en route. Isabella departed Port Jackson on 18 July, bound for Ceylon. After leaving Batavia on 1 July, she sailed to Madras.

=== Convict voyage #5 (1833) ===
Her next convict voyage occurred under the command of David Brown and surgeon Oliver Sproule. Isabella left Plymouth, England, on 28 July 1833 and arrived in Hobart Town on 14 November. She embarked 300 male convicts and had no convict deaths en route. Isabella departed Hobart Town on 29 December, bound for India.

=== Convict voyage #6 (1842) ===
Isabella's last convict voyage took place under the command of George Sinclair and surgeon Campbell France. She left Portsmouth, England, on 19 January 1842, and arrived in Hobart Town on 19 May. She embarked 267 male convicts and had one convict death en route. Isabella departed Hobart Town on 9 June, bound for Sydney with passengers and cargo, arriving on 20 June. She left Port Jackson on 27 July, bound for Singapore.

== Subsequent career ==
In 1837 Duncan Dunbar purchased Isabella. Eleven years later, in 1848, he sold her to Simson & Co., London, who sailed her in the North American trade. In 1850 her owner and master was A. Simson. She was last listed in Lloyd's Register in 1850.
