= London Chartered Bank of Australia =

English-run bank in NSW and Victoria, Australia

The London Chartered Bank of Australia (from 1893 the London Bank of Australia) was an English-run Australian bank which operated from 1852 to 1921.

== History ==
The London Chartered Bank of Australia was formed in October 1852, with the issuing of a prospectus and granting of a royal charter for a new London-based joint stock bank to operate in the colonies of New South Wales and Victoria. The chairman was Duncan Dunbar, while the directors included numerous banking and business figures from England, Ireland and Australia. It was promoted as taking advantage of the economic boom associated with the Australian gold rushes. The appointment of serving New South Wales Auditor-General Francis Merewether as a director led to controversy in New South Wales.

A manager and clerk staff were sent from England to New South Wales on the Harbinger in May 1853. Branches in Collins Street, Melbourne and George Street, Sydney opened in July 1853, the latter occupying the former premises of the defunct Bank of Australia, with a Geelong branch following in October 1853. A succession of branches in regional mining centres followed in 1855-56, with Ballarat, Beechworth and Dunolly among them.

During the 1865 Victorian supply crisis, the London Chartered Bank was the only bank willing to extend a loan to the government. The bank's only Victorian director, premier James McCulloch, did not share the concerns of his competitors about the scheme's constitutional legitimacy.

By 1893, the bank had main offices in Melbourne and Sydney, thirty-four branches in Victoria, five other city and suburban branches in Sydney, eight regional New South Wales branches (Bourke, Broken Hill, Deniliquin, Hay, Katoomba, Newcastle, Waverley and Wilcannia) and four branches in Queensland (Brisbane, Ipswich, Townsville and Charters Towers).

The bank experienced a £300,000 bank run in April 1893 as part of the 1893 banking crisis, which caused it to abruptly close pending reconstruction on 26 April, despite the bank having generally been regarded as in a satisfactory position and having just announced a proposed dividend. A voluntary winding-up order was granted in London in mid-May while reconstruction discussions continued. The process of negotiating and approving a reconstruction scheme that would see a new institution, the London Bank of Australia, take over the assets, liabilities and operations of the bank, went on through June and July. It reopened under the new name and structure on 7 August in Australia and 8 August in London.

In August 1920, the bank announced that it had received a takeover proposal by the English, Scottish & Australian Bank seeking a controlling interest in the bank and that the directors had reached a provisional agreement for amalgamation into the ES&A Bank if sufficient shareholders were willing to sell. The ES&A Bank was successful in the takeover, and the London Bank ceased to exist when the ES&A Bank assumed control of its business from 2 May 1921.

== Heritage buildings ==
Many of the bank's former branch buildings remain today, with several now heritage listed. They include:

- Beeac, Victoria
- Bourke Street, Melbourne
- Clunes, Victoria
- Dunolly, Victoria
- Fitzroy North, Victoria
- Geelong Victoria
- Kerang, Victoria
- St Arnaud, Victoria
- Wangaratta, Victoria
- Bourke, New South Wales
