= Duncan Dunbar (brewer) =

Scottish brewer and wine merchant (c.1764–1825)

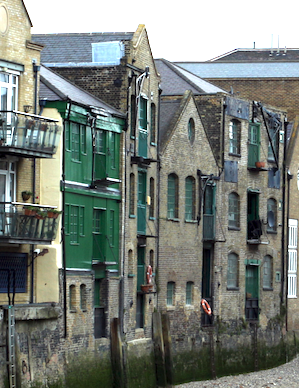
Dunbar Wharf, Limehouse

Duncan Dunbar (c. 1764–1825) was a Scottish brewer and wine merchant.

Dunbar was born at Balnageith near Forres, in what was then Elginshire. He moved to London in the 1790s and established a brewery and wine-and-spirit business at Dunbar Wharf in Limehouse, on the River Thames.

Dunbar prospered and had two sons and six daughters. His son Duncan Dunbar joined the family business and became a partner at the age of 21. When Dunbar died in 1825, aged 61, his son Duncan took over the business at the age of 22. Duncan subsequently expanded the business into shipping, beginning his shipowning career in 1827.
