= James Laing (shipbuilder) =

British shipbuilder

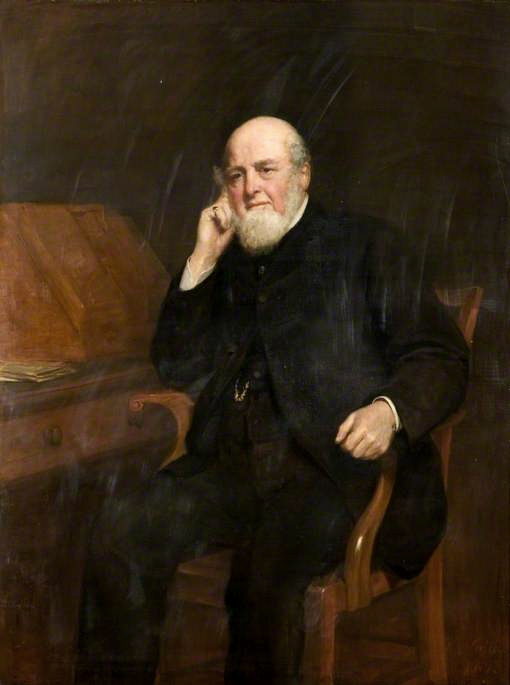
Sir James Laing, portrait by John Collier, c.1896

Sir James Laing (1823–1901) was a British shipbuilder and founder of James Laing & Sons in Sunderland.

== Life ==
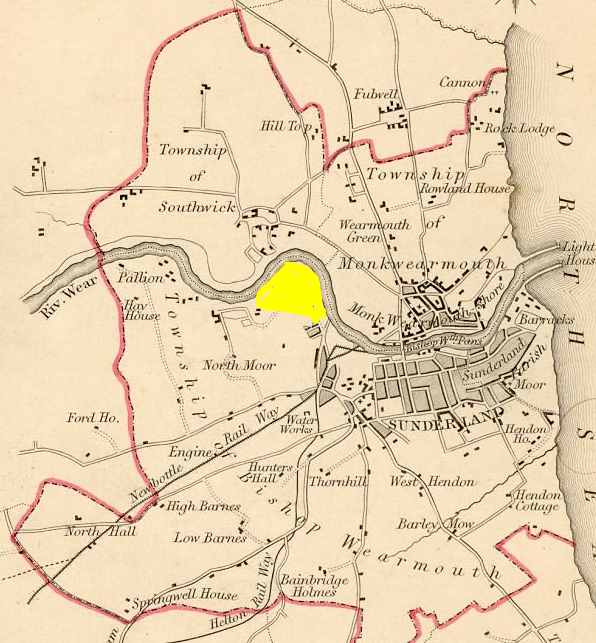
Deptford Yard marked on the 1857 map of Sunderland

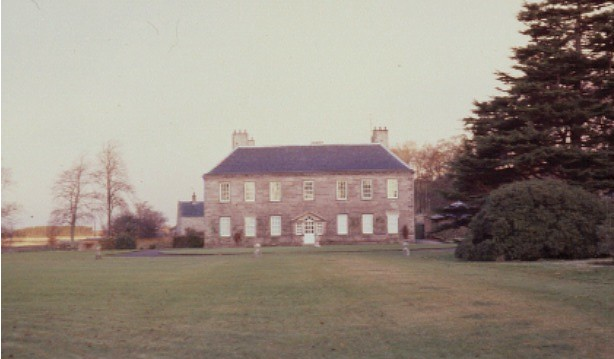
Etal Manor

He was born at Deptford House in Bishopwearmouth (later known as Sunderland) on 11 January 1823 the only son of Philip Laing and Anne Jobling. His father was also a shipbuilder, having founded Laings of Deptford Yard with his brother John Laing (both from Fife) in 1793. Deptford Yard was a satelitte facility linked to Deptford but based in Sunderland. Their first ship the "Horta" had been built on the Harbour Sands near Sunderland. They then formed a shipbuilding yard on a bend on the River Wear.

In 1843 James Laing took over the business and renamed it "James Laing & Sons". The company had a strong connection to Duncan Dunbar & Co, building one ship per year for them from 1843 to 1863. Duncan Dunbar continued to build ships but switched builder to Pile, Hay & Co in Sunderland.

Laing & Co is credited with the invention of the first oil tanker around 1855. James was Chairman of the River Wear Commission for 32 years from 1868 to 1900. Linked to this oil interest, which mainly obtained oil from Burma, Laing was involved from a very early stage in the construction and control of the Suez Canal and from around 1856 was a Director of the Suez Canal Company. In this capacity in 1883 he represented British shipowners in lowering fees and duties at the canal.

From 1879 he was Sheriff of Durham and was also Deputy Lieutenant of the county. In 1881 he stood unsuccessfully as Liberal candidate for North Durham, losing to Sir George Elliot the Conservative candidate.

James was knighted by Queen Victoria in 1897.

He died on 15 December 1901 at his residence Etal Manor in Northumberland.

There was a lull in ship production from 1902 to 1909 following his death but the First World War revitalised the company and it was the highest producer of warships in Tyne and Wear: 18 ships totalling over 100,000 tons.

The company records are held at the National Archive in Kew.

== Ships built ==
- Agincourt (1844 ship) commissioned by Duncan Dunbar (1804–1862) as a prisoner transport ship
- Sea Park (1845 ship) for Duncan Dunbar
- Amity (1853 ship) the yard's first iron steamer
- Dunbar (1853 ship)
- Duncan Dunbar (1857 ship) a clipper, the yard's twelfth ship
- Dunbar Castle (1864 ship)
- City of Adelaide (1864) completed by Pile, Hay & Co.
- Queen Wilhelmina (1898 ship)
- Umtata (1898 ship)
- Tomoana (1899 ship)

Built by James Laing & Sons Ltd

- War Rambler (1917), WWI A-class standard cargo ship
- British Consul (1924), a steam tanker
- British Prudence (1939), a motor tanker
- Empire Cavalier (1942), a motor tanker

== Family ==
In 1847 he married Mary Tanner.

- Philip Henry Laing (1849–1907) who took over the company
- Mary Laing (b. 1850) Mary Tanner died soon after her death

In 1855 Laing married Theresa Talbot Peacock (b. 1832) daughter of Thomas Peacock. They were married at St Andrew's church in Bishop Auckland. Their children were:

- George Laing (b. 1856)
- Florence T Laing (b. 1860) twin
- Thomas T Laing (b. 1860) twin
- Maud Laing (b. 1863)
- Sophia S Laing (b. 1865)
- Margaret J Laing (b. 1868)
- Eleanor S Laing (b. 1870)
- Louisa H Laing (b. 1873)
- Bryan Laing (b. 1876)

== Artistic recognition ==
He was portrayed by John Collier.
