= List of shipwrecks in June 1846 =

The list of shipwrecks in June 1846 includes ships sunk, foundered, wrecked, grounded, or otherwise lost during June 1846.

== 1 June ==
List of shipwrecks: 1 June 1846
Ship	State	Description
Agincourt	United Kingdom	The ship was driven ashore between Rye, Sussex and Dungeness, Kent. She was on a voyage from Madras, India to London. She was refloated and resumed her voyage.
Eliza and Ann	United Kingdom	The ship was driven ashore and wrecked near Olinda, Brazil. She was on a voyage from Newport, Monmouthshire to the Rio Grande.
Sally	United Kingdom	The ship ran aground on the Margate Sand, off the coast of Kent. She was on a voyage from London to Weymouth, Dorset. She was refloated and taken in to Margate.
Samson	United Kingdom	The ship struck the Riessick Rock, off the north coast of Cornwall and sank. Her crew were rescued. she was on a voyage from Neath, Glamorgan to Exeter, Devon.
Thomas Worthington	United Kingdom	The ship ran aground on the Whelps Rock, off the coast of County Limerick. She was on a voyage from Trinidad to Limerick.

== 2 June ==
List of shipwrecks: 2 June 1846
Ship	State	Description
Phoenix	United Kingdom	The ship ran aground at Greencastle, County Donegal.
Smithamby	United Kingdom	The ship was driven ashore in the Hooghly River. She was on a voyage from Calcutta, India to Liverpool. She was refloated on 5 June and taken in to Diamond Harbour.

== 3 June ==
List of shipwrecks: 3 June 1846
Ship	State	Description
Anne	United Kingdom	The ship ran aground on the Felsand, in the Baltic Sea off Saaremaa, Russia and was damaged. She was on a voyage from Liverpool, Lancashire to Kronstadt, Russia. She was later refloated and taken in to Kronstadt for repairs.
Sarah Stewart	United Kingdom	The ship was wrecked near Louisburg, Nova Scotia, British North America. Her crew were rescued. She was on a voyage from an English port to Quebec City, Province of Canada, British North America.
Watermillock	United Kingdom	The ship was driven ashore in the Magdalen Islands, Nova Scotia. She was on a voyage from London to Miramichi, New Brunswick. She was refloated the next day and completed her voyage.

== 4 June ==
List of shipwrecks: 4 June 1846
Ship	State	Description
Cousin	France	The ship ran aground on the Goodwin Sands, Kent, United Kingdom. She was on a voyage from Granville, Manche to Newcastle upon Tyne, Northumberland, United Kingdom. She was refloated and resumed her voyage.
Nicoline	Norway	The schooner ran aground on the Goodwin Sands. She was on a voyage from a French port to Gothenburg, Sweden. She was refloated and resumed her voyage.

== 5 June ==
List of shipwrecks: 5 June 1846
Ship	State	Description
Anne Grant	United Kingdom	The ship was arrived at Bombay, India from London with a smouldering fire and was scuttled.
Eliza and Anne	United Kingdom	The ship was driven ashore 8 nautical miles (15 km) north of Olinda Point, Brazil. She was on a voyage from Newport, Monmouthshire to the Rio Grande do Sol, Brazil.
Messenger	United Kingdom	The ship was wrecked off Langlade Island.
Trinity	United Kingdom	The paddle tug caught fire and sank in the River Thames at Gravesend, Kent. She was subsequently refloated, repaired and returned to service.

== 6 June ==
List of shipwrecks: 6 June 1846
Ship	State	Description
Carl Wilhelm	Bremen	The barque was wrecked near Galveston, Texas, United States with the loss of three lives.

== 8 June ==
List of shipwrecks: 8 June 1846
Ship	State	Description
Nailer	United Kingdom	The ship was abandoned in the Atlantic Ocean. Her crew were rescued. She was on a voyage from Patagonia, Argentina to London.
Trial	United Kingdom	The schooner was severely damaged by fire at Halifax, Nova Scotia.

== 9 June ==
List of shipwrecks: 9 June 1846
Ship	State	Description
Express	United Kingdom	The ship ran aground at Gibraltar. She was on a voyage from Glasgow, Renfrewshire to Marseille, Bouches-du-Rhône, France. She was refloated and resumed her voyage.
Matilda	United Kingdom	The ship sprang a leak. She put in to Padstow, Cornwall in a sinking condition.
Sarah and Elizabeth	United Kingdom	The ship was driven ashore at the Flamborough Head Lighthouse, Yorkshire.

== 10 June ==
List of shipwrecks: 10 June 1846
Ship	State	Description
John Henry	(United Kingdom of Great Britain and Ireland) British North America	The ship was wrecked in Egmont's Bay, Prince Edward Island. Her crew were rescued. She was on a voyage from Miramichi, New Brunswick to Halifax, Nova Scotia.
Salisbury	United Kingdom	The ship ran aground in the Saint Lawrence River. She was on a voyage from Quebec City, Province of Canada, British North America to Hull, Yorkshire. She put back to Quebec City in a waterlogged condition.
Wilhelmine	Sweden	The ship capsized at Gävle.

== 11 June ==
List of shipwrecks: 11 June 1846
Ship	State	Description
Ganges	United Kingdom	The ship ran aground near Beachy Head, Sussex. She was on a voyage from London to Calcutta, India. She was refloated and resumed her voyage.
Gray	United Kingdom	The ship ran aground at Redcar, Yorkshire. She was refloated and resumed her voyage.

== 12 June ==
List of shipwrecks: 12 June 1846
Ship	State	Description
Pekin	United Kingdom	The ship was wrecked at "Lance-aux-Vallée", Province of Canada, British North America. She was on a voyage from the Greenock, Renfrewshire to Quebec City, Province of Canada.

== 13 June ==
List of shipwrecks: 13 June 1846
Ship	State	Description
Therese	Hamburg	The ship ran aground on the Vogel Sand, in the North Sea. She was on a voyage from Sierra Leone to Hamburg. She was refloated.

== 14 June ==
List of shipwrecks: 14 June 1846
Ship	State	Description
Fortuna	Argentina	The sloop ran aground and was wrecked in the River Plate between "Las Paris" and Colonias Unidad.
Rambler	United Kingdom	The paddle steamer ran aground on the Maiden Rocks and sank. All on board were rescued. She was on a voyage from Liverpool, Lancashire to Sligo.

== 15 June ==
List of shipwrecks: 15 June 1846
Ship	State	Description
Mary	United Kingdom	The sloop struck a sunken rock and sank in the North Sea of the coast of Lothian. Her three crew were rescued. She was on a voyage from East Wemyss to Inverkeithing, Fife.

== 16 June ==
List of shipwrecks: 16 June 1846
Ship	State	Description
Alexander	United Kingdom	The ship sank at Sharpness, Gloucestershire.
Baltic	United States	The whaler went ashore on Bering Island in a gale and soon broke up. The crew made it ashore where the whaler Bengal (United States) rescued them on 5 July.
John Cree	United Kingdom	The barque was wrecked at St. Jago de Cuba, Cuba. Her crew were rescued. She was on a voyage from Calcutta, India to Liverpool, Lancashire.
Mary	United Kingdom	The ship struck a sunken rock and foundered in the North Sea off Leith, Lothian. She was on a voyage from East Wemyss, Fife to Inverkeithing, Fife.

== 17 June ==
List of shipwrecks: 17 June 1846
Ship	State	Description
Leopoldo Eugenio	Flag unknown	The ship was wrecked on the coast of Patagonia, Argentina.
Lady Alice	United Kingdom	The ship sprang a leak and foundered in the Mediterranean Sea off Mallorca, Spain. Her crew were rescued. She was on a voyage from Sicily to Brixham, Devon.
Psyche	(United Kingdom of Great Britain and Ireland) Malaya	The barque was wrecked on the Setang Banks, off the coast of Moulmein. Her crew were rescued. She was on a voyage from Arracan, India to Penang.
Unity	United Kingdom	The ship was destroyed by fire whilst on a voyage from Dartmouth, Devon to London. The burnt-out hull was towed in to Brixham, Devon.

== 19 June ==
List of shipwrecks: 19 June 1846
Ship	State	Description
Cleopatra	United Kingdom	The barque capsized at Quebec City, Province of Canada, British North America. She was towed in to Hadlow Cove and was abandoned by her crew.
Nouveau Tambour	France	The East Indiaman caught fire at Marseille, Bouches-du-Rhône and was scuttled. Arson was suspected.

== 18 June ==
List of shipwrecks: 18 June 1846
Ship	State	Description
Mary Stewart	United Kingdom	The ship was wrecked near "Port Malo" with the loss of her captain.

== 20 June ==
List of shipwrecks: 20 June 1846
Ship	State	Description
Pluto	United Kingdom	The East India Company steamship was wrecked in a typhoon at "Chick Py-wan", Hong Kong. She was refloated on 17 July.
Rapid	United Kingdom	The barque was wrecked on Grand Cayman. Her crew were rescued. She was on a voyage from Jamaica to London.

== 21 June ==
List of shipwrecks: 21 June 1846
Ship	State	Description
Fanny	United Kingdom	The ship was driven ashore on Seskar, Russia. She was on a voyage from Saint Petersburg to London. She was refloated on 13 July and towed in to Vyborg in a waterlogged condition.
Gipsey	United Kingdom	The ship was driven ashore at Eastbourne, Sussex. She was on a voyage from South Shields, County Durham to Havre de Grâce, Seine-Inférieure, France. She was refloated and put in to Lowestoft, Suffolk, where she arrived on 24 June.
Persian	United Kingdom	The ship was wrecked on North Bardsoe, in Aspey's Bay. Her crew were rescued.

== 22 June ==
List of shipwrecks: 22 June 1846
Ship	State	Description
Aurora	United Kingdom	The ship was driven ashore and wrecked at St Davids, Pembrokeshire. She was on a voyage from Llanelly, Glamorgan to Drogheda, County Louth.
Elle	France	The chasse-marée was lost near "Baguenault" with the loss of four lives.
Vrow Hilkea	Kingdom of Hanover	The ship was wrecked on the Mernmert Bank, in the North Sea off the Hanoverian coast.

== 23 June ==
List of shipwrecks: 23 June 1846
Ship	State	Description
Bernhardus	Duchy of Holstein	The ship departed from Cuxhaven for Rochester, Kent, United Kingdom. No further trace, presumed foundered in the North Sea with the loss of all hands.
Charterfield	United Kingdom	The ship was driven ashore at Southsea, Hampshire. She was refloated and sailed for Seaham, County Durham.
Godfrey	United Kingdom	The ship ran aground off Honfleur, Calvados, France and was wrecked. She was on a voyage from Belfast, County Antrim to Honfleur.
Liverpool	United Kingdom	The ship was driven ashore and wrecked on "Basque Island". She was on a voyage from Quebec City, Province of Canada, British North America to Liverpool, Lancashire.
Malvina	United Kingdom	The ship ran aground on the Goodwin Sands, Kent. She was on a voyage from Waterford to a Baltic port. She was refloated and resumed her voyage.
Peruvian	United Kingdom	The ship was wrecked on Booby Island, New South Wales. She was on a voyage from Sydney, New South Wales to China.

== 24 June ==
List of shipwrecks: 26 June 1846
Ship	State	Description
Essay	United Kingdom	The ship struck a rock in the Douro and was holed. She was on a voyage from Porto to Liverpool, Lancashire. She put back to Porto.
Guiana	United Kingdom	The ship was wrecked on a reef off Pointe aux Piments, Mauritius. She was on a voyage from Port Adelaide, South Australia to Mauritius.
St. Kiavan	United Kingdom	The steamship was driven ashore at Ayr. She was on a voyage from Campbeltown, Argyllshire to Ayr.

== 25 June ==
List of shipwrecks: 25 June 1846
Ship	State	Description
Eagle	United Kingdom	The paddle steamer struck a sunken rock in Courland Bay, Tobago. She was on a voyage from Barbados to Tobago. She was refloated.
Mandarin	United Kingdom	The barque was wrecked on the Alligator Reef. Her crew were rescued. She was on a voyage from Jamaica to Liverpool, Lancashire.
Robert and Alice	United Kingdom	The smack was driven ashore and severely damaged at the Point of Holm, Isle of Lewis, Outer Hebrides. She was on a voyage from Stornoway, Isle of Lewis to Wick, Caithness. She was refloated and put back to Stornoway.

== 26 June ==
List of shipwrecks: 26 June 1846
Ship	State	Description
Eleanor	(United Kingdom of Great Britain and Ireland) New South Wales	The barque was wrecked on the coast of New Guinea. Her crew were rescued. She was on a voyage from Sydney to New Guinea.
Times	United Kingdom	The ship ran aground on the Gunfleet Sand, in the North Sea off the coast of Essex. She was on a voyage from Newcastle upon Tyne, Northumberland to London. She was refloated and taken in to Harwich, Essex in a leaky condition.
Sheffield	United Kingdom	The ship sprang a leak and foundered in the North Sea off the Farne Islands, Northumberland. Her crew were rescued by Jupiter (France). Sheffield was on a voyage from Grangemouth, Stirlingshire to South Shields, County Durham.
Sutlej	(United Kingdom of Great Britain and Ireland) British North America	The brig was wrecked on the Sow and Pig Rocks with the loss of 30 of the 58 people on board. Survivors were rescued by Dusky Sally (United States). Sutlej was on a voyage from Pictou, Nova Scotia to Fall River, Massachusetts, United States.
Zephyr	(United Kingdom of Great Britain and Ireland) British North America	The ship departed from Antigua for the Turks Islands. No further trace, presumed foundered with the loss of all hands.

== 27 June ==
List of shipwrecks: 27 June 1846
Ship	State	Description
Matthew	United Kingdom	The ship was driven ashore south of Kronstadt, Russia. She was on a voyage from Sunderland, County Durham to Kronstadt, Russia. She was refloated on 29 June and taken in to Kronstadt.
Sarah Berry	(United Kingdom of Great Britain and Ireland) New Zealand	The cutter was driven onto the bar of Whangaroa Harbour and destroyed during a gale. All passengers and crew were saved.
Tenedos	United Kingdom	The ship was wrecked near St. Peter's, Nova Scotia, British North America. She was on a voyage from Miramichi, New Brunswick, British North America to Newcastle upon Tyne, Northumberland.

== 28 June ==
List of shipwrecks: 28 June 1846
Ship	State	Description
Henry Mitchell	United Kingdom	The schooner struck a bridge, was holed and sank at Gothenburg. Sweden. She was on a voyage from Newcastle upon Tyne, Northumberland to Gothenburg.
Wellington	United Kingdom	The ship was driven ashore at Grand-Métis, Province of Canada, British North America. She was on a voyage from Quebec City, Province of Canada to Pembroke. She was refloated on 29 July and resumed her voyage.

== Unknown date ==
List of shipwrecks: Unknown date June 1846
Ship	State	Description
Abbey	United States	The barque was abandoned in the Atlantic Ocean before 19 June.
Alerte	France	The ship was lost off Mayagüez, Puerto Rico.
Aurora	(United Kingdom of Great Britain and Ireland) New Zealand	The schooner was driven ashore and damaged at Haere Kino.
Caledonia	United Kingdom	The ship ran aground in the Paraná River at "San Loringo" before 10 June. She was set afire to prevent her capture by the Argentinians.
Earl of Rellie	United Kingdom	The ship was driven ashore at Rattray Head, Aberdeenshire. She was refloated on 7 June and taken in to Aberdeen for repairs.
Helvetia	France	The whaler was destroyed by fire in a suspected case of arson.
Hugenot	United States	The ship caught fire on 12 June having been struck by lightning while on a voyage from New Orleans, Louisiana, United States to Liverpool, Lancashire with a cargo of cotton. She put in to Savannah, Georgia, where she arrived on 14 June.
Hugh Wallace	United Kingdom	The ship foundered in the Atlantic Ocean before 11 June. Her crew took to two boats; those in one of the boats were rescued.
Intelligence	(United Kingdom of Great Britain and Ireland) British North America	The schooner was wrecked on the south coast of Cuba.
Laura	United Kingdom	The ship was driven ashore on the coast of Brazil. She was refloated and taken in to Maranhão, Brazil, where she arrived on 11 June.
Nelson	United Kingdom	The ship ran aground on the Florida Reef. She was on a voyage from Jamaica to London. She was refloated and put in to Key West, Florida, United States, where she arrived on 4 June.
Nicolai	Flag unknown	The ship was wrecked on the Spanish coast before 12 June. She was on a voyage from Cette, Hérault, France to Hamburg.
Rose	United Kingdom	The schooner was driven ashore at Domesnes, Russia. She was on a voyage from Hull to Riga, Russia. She was refloated and taken in to Riga, where she arrived on 20 June.
Squatter	United States	The schooner was wrecked at "Port Sarry", British North America. Her crew were rescued.
Susanna	United Kingdom	The ship ran aground in The Smalls. She was on a voyage from London to Liverpool, Lancashire. She was refloated and resumed her voyage, arriving at Liverpool on 5 June.
Welcome Home	United Kingdom	The smack was driven ashore at Sennen, Cornwall. She had been refloated by 20 June and sailed for Plymouth, Devon.
