= William Rathbone (1809 ship) =

History
- Name: William Rathbone
- Namesake: William Rathbone IV
- Launched: 1809, Liverpool
- Fate: Burnt at sea on 8 May 1846

General characteristics
- Tons burthen: 1809:326 (bm); 1845: Old Act: 413 (bm); New Act (post 1836): 505 (bm)
- Complement: 1809:30; 1811:25; 1812:25; 1846:23
- Armament: 1809:14 × 18-pounder carronades + 2 × 4-pounder guns; 1811:12 × 18-pounder carronades; 1812:12 × 18-pounder carronades

William Rathbone was launched at Liverpool in 1809 as a West Indiaman. During her career she recaptured a British vessel, and was herself captured by an American privateer, but quickly recaptured by the Royal Navy. Later she traded with Africa, and eventually Calcutta. She burnt at sea in May 1846 when a cargo of jute underwent spontaneous combustion.

== Career ==
Captain Archibald Kennan acquired a letter of marque on 30 October 1809. William Rathbone first appeared in Lloyd's Register (LR) with Kinnan, master, Tobin & Co., owners, and trade Liverpool–Demerara.

William Rathbone rescued Hugo's crew after they had abandoned her. Hugo had been on a voyage from Honduras to London when she had sprung a leak. William Rathbone was coming from Demerara. (Note: Hugo, of 170 tons (bm), was a Danish prize. Her master was Camplemar and her owner Smith & Co. She was armed with two 3-pounder and eight 6-pounder guns. Her entry in LR for 1810 carried the annotation "LOST".)

On 5 November 1811 Captain Lawrence Hall acquired a letter of marque on 5 November 1811.

On 24 November the French privateer Bristnair, of Saint-Malo, and of 14 guns and 160 men, captured Mary, which was sailing from Newfoundland to Ireland. William Rathbone recaptured Mary and sent her into Liverpool. Mary arrived at Liverpool on 3 December.

Captain Francis Darnoult acquired a letter of marque on 20 June 1812. On 27 September, as William Rathbone was approaching Demerary Bar, the American privateer Saucy Jack captured her and put a prize crew aboard. However, HMS Charybdis recaptured William Rathbone on 8 October. She arrived at St Thomas on 12 October. William Rathbone had been armed with 14 guns and had a crew of 30 men. When Charybdis recaptured William Rathbone she returned the vessel to her officers and crew. (Note: Niles Weekly register (Vol.3, p. 157), reported that Saucy Jack had taken the prize in the port of Demerara, and that William Rathbone had been armed with fourteen 18-pounder and two 6-pounder guns. She had also had a cargo worth £40,000.)

On 29 December 1815 William Rathbone, King, master, from Cape Henry, Virginia, to St. Domingo, got on shore near Liverpool. She filled with water and fell on her side but was expected to be gotten off. She was refloated and beached in the River Mersey on 3 January 1816.

On 17 April 1818 William Rathbone put into Corunna due to "stress of weather". She was 10 days into a voyage from Liverpool to Demerara. In 1819 she underwent repairs for damages.

On 1 April 1821 William Rathbone put into Lisbon leaky and having lost her bulwarks. She had been on a voyage from Africa to Liverpool. There she landed her cargo and she was surveyed.

Year	Master	Owner	Trade	Source & notes
1825	H.Baldwin	Tobin & Co.	Liverpool–Africa	LR; damages repaired 1819
1830	J.Griffiths	Horsefall & Co.	Liverpool–Africa	LR; good repair 1821 and large repair 1829
1835	W.Rathbone			LR
1840	R.Roberts	Agett & Co.	Liverpool–Africa	LR; small repair 1838 and large repair 1839

William Rathbone underwent a thorough repair and lengthening in 1845. In 1846 her master was Hesoason and her owner was Agett & Co. Her trade was Liverpool–Calcutta.

== Fate ==
On 8 May 1846, while on a voyage from Calcutta to London, William Rathbone caught fire at 32°N 36°W in the Atlantic Ocean. She sank the next day. Agincourt rescued her crew. The fire was attributed to spontaneous combustion in the cargo of jute in her hold. Lloyd's Register for 1846 carried the notation "LOST".
