= Agincourt (1841 ship) =

History

United Kingdom
- Name: Agincourt
- Namesake: Battle of Agincourt
- Launched: 1841
- Fate: Foundered 1866
- Notes: Bateson confuses this Agincourt with Agincourt (1844 ship).

General characteristics
- Tons burthen: 933, or 958 (bm)
- Length: 167 ft 2 in (51.0 m)
- Beam: 35 ft 5 in (10.8 m)
- Depth: 15 ft 5 in (4.7 m)

Agincourt was launched in 1841. She spent most of her career sailing between Britain and the Far East. She foundered in 1866 on a voyage from Southampton to Hong Kong.

== Career ==
Agincourt first appeared in Lloyd's Register in 1841 with Walker, master, and Green, owner. The 1842 volume gave her trade as London–Calcutta.

On 8 May 1846, while on a voyage from Calcutta to London, William Rathbone caught fire at 32°N 36°W in the Atlantic Ocean. She sank the next day. Agincourt, Nesbitt, master, rescued her crew.

Year	Master	Owner	Trade	Notes
1845	Walker; Nesbit	R. Green	London–Calcutta	
1850	Nesbit	R. Green	London–Calcutta	
1855	C. Hyne	R. Green	London–Calcutta	Small repairs 1854
1860	Williamson	R. Green	London	Small repairs 1854 & 1858
1865	Paris; Mourillyan	R.Green; Kitto & Co.	London–Australia; London–China	Small repairs 1854 & 1858
1867	J. Philpot	Livingston & Co.	Southampton–China	

== Loss ==
Agincourt foundered on 24 June 1866 at 36°S 25°E while sailing from Southampton to Hong Kong with coal and boilers. The crew was saved but the captain died of exhaustion.

Lloyd's Register for 1866 had the notation "LOST" by her name.
