= Ann McKim =

Clipper ship built in Maryland, US

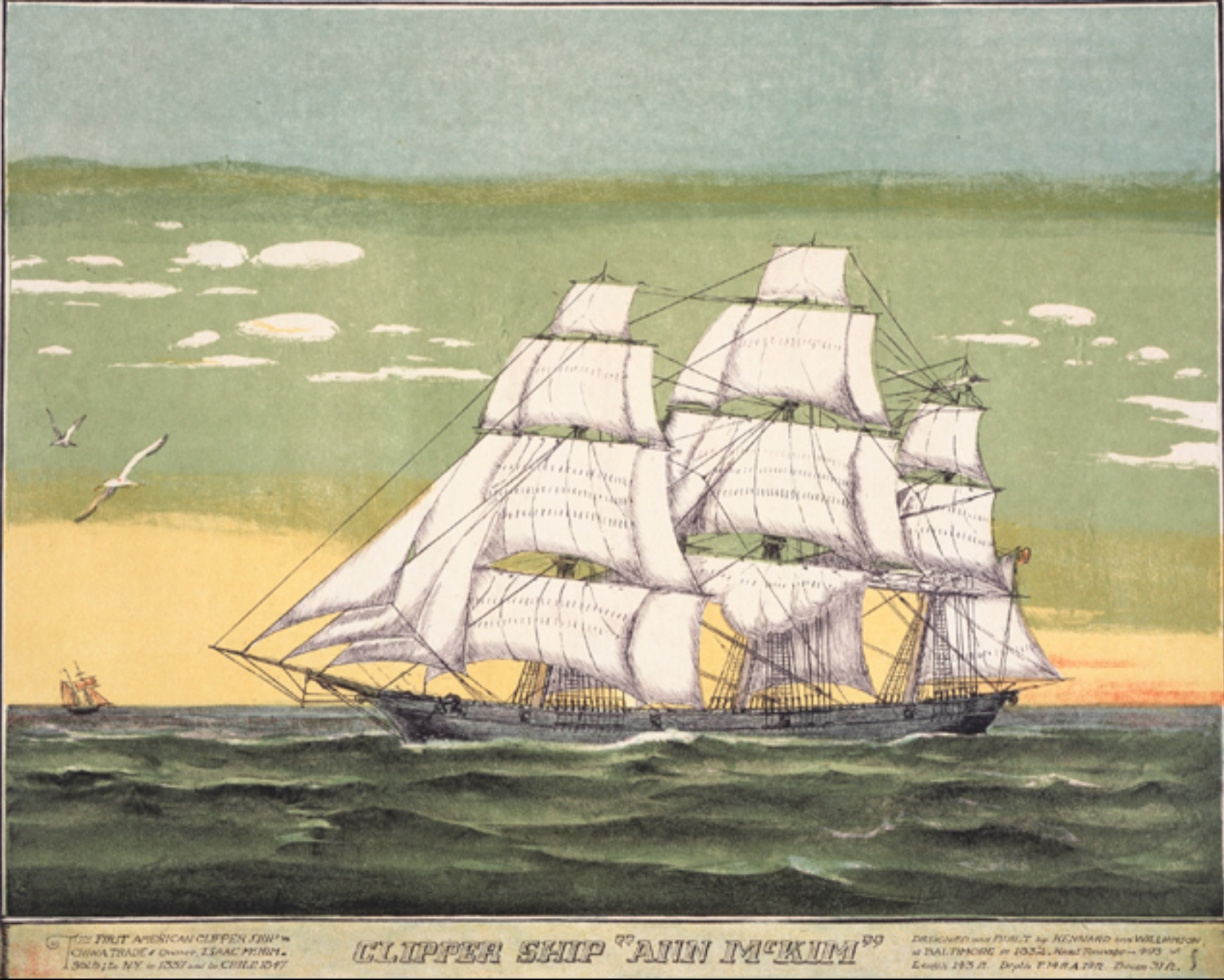
- Ann McKim

History

United States
- Owner: Isaac McKim and his cousin, John McKim Jr.
- Builder: Kennard & Williamson, Fell's Point, Maryland
- Cost: $50,000
- Launched: 4 June 1833
- In service: 1833
- Fate: Sold to Howland & Aspinwall 1838

United States
- Owner: Howland & Aspinwall
- Acquired: 1838
- Fate: Sold to Chile 1847

Chile
- Acquired: 1847
- Out of service: 1851
- Fate: Dismantled 1852

General characteristics
- Type: Clipper
- Tonnage: 493 tons OM
- Length: 143 ft (44 m)
- Beam: 31 ft (9.4 m)
- Draft: 14 ft (4.3 m)
- Propulsion: Sails
- Complement: 18 men

Ann McKim was a 143 ft (44 m), 493 ton OM American clipper ship, launched in Baltimore, Maryland in 1833 and broken up in 1852. One of the early true clippers, she was designed to meet the increasing demand for faster cargo transportation between the United States and China in the early 1840s. The opening of new Treaty ports in the East allowed American merchants greater access to trade with China, leading to the need for ships that could move cargo more quickly than traditional merchant ships. Ann McKim was one of the ships that had answered the demand in the early years and sailed between New York and China in 1840–1842, until newer and faster cargo-carriers, such as the nearly 600-ton clipper Houqua, the 598-ton China packet Helena, Witch of the Wave, and Rainbow (with the last two built expressly to outperform Ann McKim) started dominating the shipping world of the US-China trade and Ann McKim was shifted back to the South American trade routes.

== History ==
Ann McKim was built in Baltimore, Maryland, United States, by James Williamson in partnership with Samuel Kennard on a commission of "the wealthy sea-dog and merchant," Honorable Issac McKim and named after his wife, Ann.

=== Kennard & Williamson partnership ===
The Kennard & Williamson partnership was a shipbuilding firm in Fell's Point, Baltimore in 1830s. The partnership began 15 June 1831. It was formed between James Joseph Williamson and Samuel Kennard (also known as Kinard and Kinnard). Williamson used to work for Kennard as a carpenter prior to the forming of the partnership. Kennard built at least five vessels before their partnership: the sloop Dolphin (95 tons), the sloop Edward (36 tons) in 1815; the brig Cervantes (231 tons) in 1818; the brig Montezuma (223 tons) in 1825; and the brig James Ramsey (134 tons) in 1830. Their partnership built only two vessels, the schooner Pennsylvania, which brought in a $1,500 profit, and Ann McKim. Kennard & Williamson also grossed a lot of profit from repair work. The partnership was dissolved on 26 September 1834. After the partnership's demise, Kennard built one more vessel in 1835, the schooner Gunpowder, 75 tons. Williamson, as a partner at Williamson & Richardson, in 1837 built the ferry Susquehanna, 453 tons (cost $56,595.81) and another fourteen vessels: a barque, two brigs and eleven schooners. Williamson died in 1839.

=== Capacity ===
Ann McKim was designed to have a small cargo capacity that made her much faster that the regular cargo ships of her time. Her launch was attended by thousands of spectators as she was hailed by a local newspaper as "the most masterly and beautiful specimen of the naval architecture" of the shipyards of Baltimore, if not any other city in the union. Although, she was a matter of pride and admiration for the public and surely for her owner, she never brought significant profit to Mr. Isaac McKim due to her small cargo capacity.

=== In the Canton trade ===
In 1838, after the death of Isaac McKim and five years in the China trade she was sold to Howland & Aspinwall, New York, the company known for owning other famous clippers, such as Rainbow and Sea Witch. Under new owner she was commanded by Captain Perry and returned to the Canton trade. The ship was heavily used and brought some profit to the owners as she was superior in speed over the other vessels engaged in that line of trade at that time.

=== Under the Chilean flag ===
The Ann McKim was sold to Valparaiso, Chile, in 1847 and sailed under the Chilean flag for five years between Valparaiso and San Francisco. Although, there are some accounts that she sailed as an Ecuadorean under Captain Van Pelt, before being registered as a Chilean vessel in December 1849. She was advertised for sale in The Daily Alta California from January to August 1850, but evidently couldn't find a buyer and on 2 September 1851 she cleared Port of San Francisco, leaving the North American waters for the very last time with Van Pelt as her captain and Orrego Bros. as owners. She was mentioned once again for sale in the issue of the Daily Alta California dated 18 February 1852 and later that year the Baltimore legend was dismantled at Valparaiso.

=== Other ships of the same name ===
In 1847, there was mention of a steamer of New Orleans of the same name participating in the Mexican–American War.

== Design ==
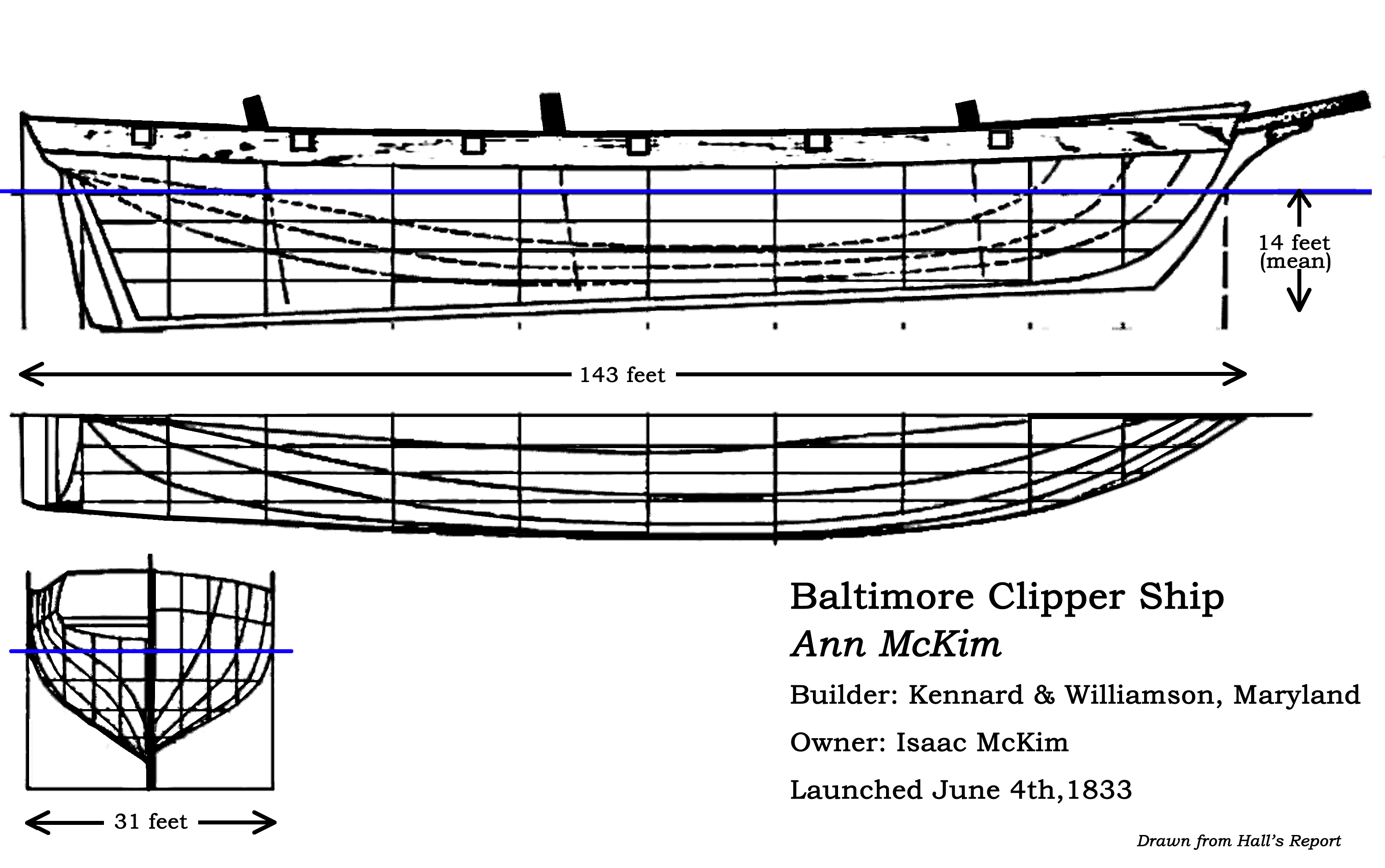
Lines of ''Ann McKim''

Ann McKim measured 143 feet in length, making her "easily the largest merchantman of her day...and...by far the handsomest." William M. Williamson, a notable authority on sailing ships at the time, described her as "a thing of beauty." She had three sky-sail yards and royal stunsails. Her square raking stern and the heavy after-drag were the common features of Baltimore clippers then. She was also distinguished by her long, easy waterlines with low freeboard and a V-shaped hull. Her length-to-width ratio of over 5:1 corresponded to an extreme clipper. The bow was round in contrast with the sharp bows of the later clippers. Her bow was decorated with a figurehead in a shape of a woman. She had sloping keel—another feature that was not present in true clippers. The frame was made of live oak. The hull was covered with imported red copper, adding $9,000 to her total cost. (The use of copper was probably related to the fact that Isaac McKim Isaac owned a copper rolling and refining mill.) The decks were of teak and her rails, hatch coamings, and skylights were finished with Spanish mahogany. The finest materials used in her construction were personally selected by Captain James Curtis. She also had twelve brass guns mounted on her together with brass capstan heads and bells. The figurehead was design after the wife of the owner, Mrs. Ann McKim.

The total amount paid by Isaac McKim for the Ann McKim was reported as $50,000. Kennard & Williamson sent thirty one bill to Isaac McKim, amounting $11,981.66, which could be all related to Ann McKim.

== Voyages ==
She was ready for her maiden voyage on 30 August 1833, under the command of Captain Walker. She brought 3,500 barrels of flour to Callao, Peru, on 3 December, after a passage of 95 days. Ann McKim remained on the South American coast for some time, and it was not until April 1834 when she sailed back to Cape Henry in 72 days and was once more lying in the port of Baltimore on 16 June 1834. In 1837 she set one of her records on the South American trade, sailing in just 59 days from Valparaiso to the Virginia Capes of Chesapeake Bay and in 42 days from off Cape Horn to Chesapeake Bay.

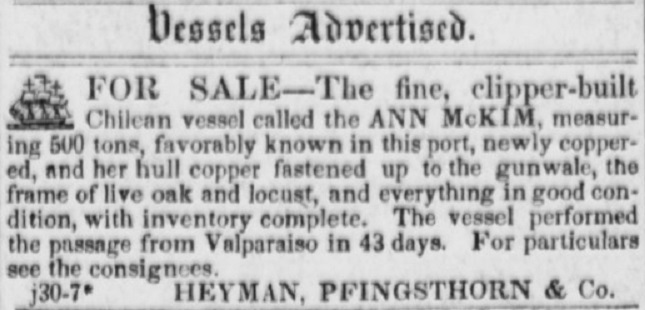
Daily Alta California, Volume 1, Number 27, 30 January 1850 — Advertising the McKim for sale.

In 1838, she made the passage from Coquimbo, Chile to Baltimore in 60 days and in 53 days from Valparaiso to Baltimore, establishing a new record of her career on this route. The same year she sailed under Captain Martin's command to China and back home in 150 days, arriving to New York on 23 November 1840. On her second voyage, she reached China in 92 days and the return trip lasted 88 days. In 1842, she set in a new record of 79 days, sailing from New York via Java Head to Anyer, Indonesia. Her return trip home to New York in 1843 was 96 days. As the faster clippers started dominating the routes to and from China the Ann McKim wasn't able to compete with them and was brought back to South America. She was sold at Valparaiso to a Chilean owners in 1847.

Under the Chilean flag, she arrived to San Francisco on 19 January 1849 from Valparaiso, touching at Guayaquil, Ecuador on 24 December 1849. This voyage lasted 51 days (51 days at sea from Valparaiso; 29 days from Guayaquil). On her next voyage from San Francisco to Valparaiso Captain James Van Pelt did not stock enough water on the ship and ten of her passengers suffered from dehydration upon her arrival in Chile on 10 October 1849.

List of known voyages
Voyage	Dates	Captain	Notes/References
Baltimore – Callao, Peru	30 August (or ~6 September) 1833 – 3 December 1833	Walker	95 (or 89) days at sea; 3,500 barrels of floor
Valparaiso, Chile – Coquimbo, Chile – Huasco, Chile – Baltimore	9 or 10 March 1834 – Unk – ~1 April 1834 – 16 June 1834	Walker	72 days at sea; $215,000 in gold, silver, cooper
Valparaiso – Baltimore	~30 April 1835 – 3 June 1835	Walker	65 days at sea; $250,000 in specie
Valparaiso – Baltimore	5 June 1837 – 3 August 1837	Walker	59 days from Valparaiso and 42 days from Cape Horn with $100,000 in specie
Coquimbo – Valparaiso – Baltimore	~6 September – ~13 September – 5 November 1838	Walker	53 days from Valparaiso and 60 days from Coquimbo to the Capes
Baltimore – Valparaiso	19 June 1939 – Unk	Martin	N/a
New York – Canton	Unk – February 1840	Martin	Arrived without cargo
Canton – Singapore	20 March 1840 – before July 1840	Martin	Cargo of tea
Canton – New York	21 or 25 June 1840 – ~September 1840	Martin	104 days
New York – Canton	Ukn – April 1841	N/a	N/a
Wampoa – New York	after 19 June 1841 – December 1841	Vasner, spelled as	Cargo of tea
China – New York	15 February 1843 – 22 May 1843	Vasmar, spelled as	95 days
China – New York	10 November 1843 – 22 February 1844	Vasmer	Cargo of tea
New York – Anyer, Indonesia	Unk – 7 July 1844	Vasmer	N/a
Whampoa – Anyer – New York	19 November 1844 – 7 December 1844 – April 1845	Vasmer	Cargo of tea
Shanghai, China – New York	in 1846	N/a	first US vessel to arrive from Shanghai
Valparaiso – Guayaquil, Ecuador – San Francisco	~December 1848 – 24 December 1848 – 19 January 1849	Rubinet	51 days at sea from Valparaiso and 29 days from Guayaquil.
San Francisco – Valparaiso	~March 1849 – 15 April 1849	N/a	45 days; $80,000 in gold
Valparaiso – San Francisco	~April 1849 – 29 June 1849	VanPelt	60 days
San Francisco – Valparaiso	29 July 1849 – Unk	VanPelt	N/a
Valparaiso – San Francisco	~December 1849 – 29 January 1850	VanPelt	42 days
San Francisco – Valparaiso	24 February 1850 – 16 April 1850	VanPelt	47 days
Valparaiso – San Francisco	Unk – 14 June 1851	VanPelt	N/a
San Francisco – Valparaiso	2 September 1851 – 8 November 1851	N/a	Last known passage

== Legacy ==
Although the near 500-ton Ann McKim was the first large clipper ship ever constructed, she ultimately was a transitional vessel, which influenced the building of Rainbow in 1845, the first extreme clipper. Rainbow's design was formulated by John W. Griffiths after he, very impressed with the speed of Ann McKim, studied her blueprints. On the same note: the terms Baltimore clipper and clipper ship should not be confused. The former refers to a ship with a displacement between 50 and 200 tons built in Chesapeake Bay in the late 18th century, and the latter to the much larger clippers of the 1840s typically from New York, New England, and Great Britain, with a displacement often ten times of the smaller Baltimore clippers.

During 1843–1844, the first American woman ever in China traveled on board of Ann McKim. (A year prior an American, Mrs. Noble was taken a prisoner in China.)

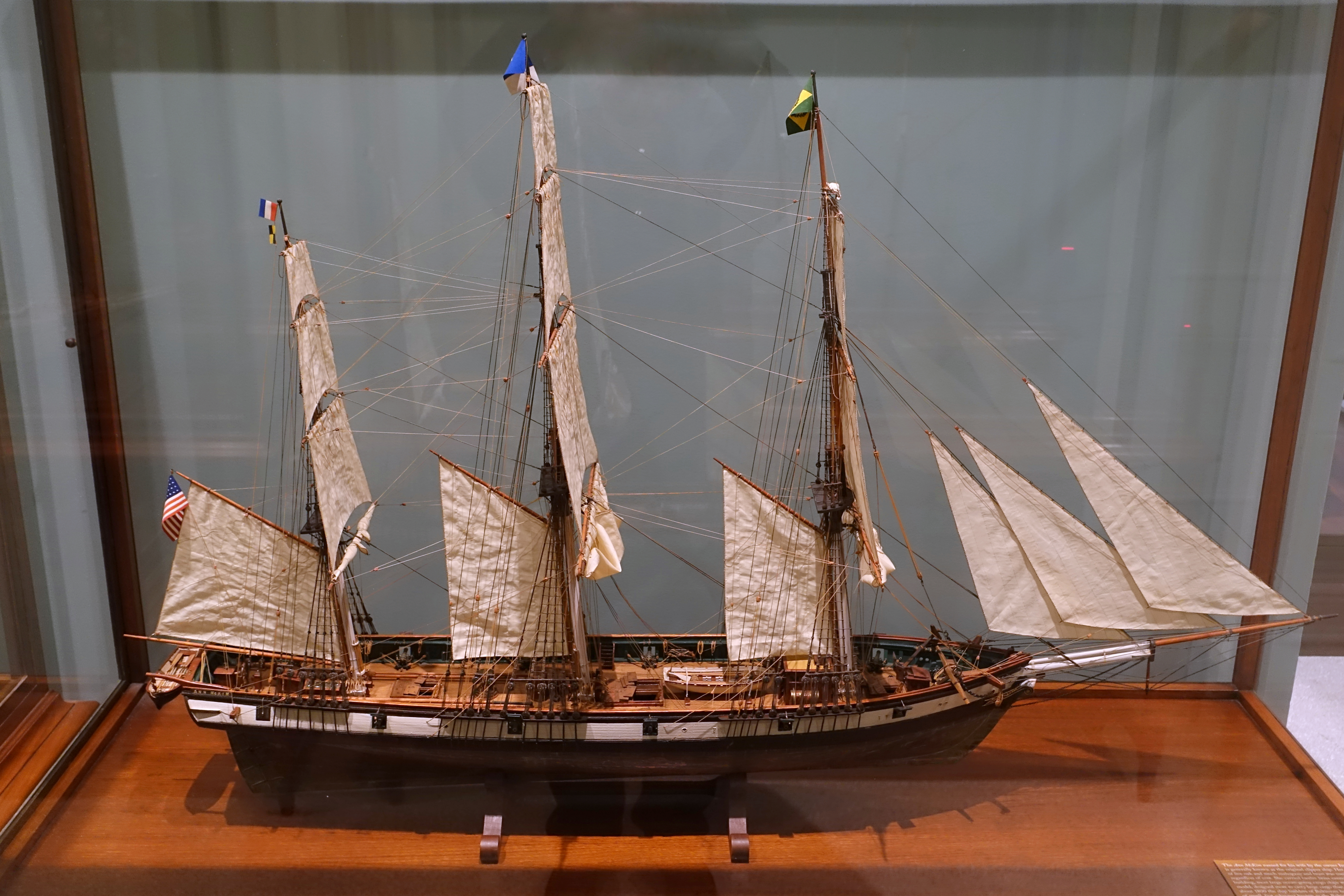
A model of Ann McKim in Addison Gallery of American Art.

In 1986, Ann McKim was induced in the fifth class of seafarers and ships by the National Maritime Hall of Fame at the American Merchant Marine Museum.

== Paintings ==
One of the earliest appearances of Ann McKim in print was a lithograph of master mariner and ship model maker E. Armitage McCann, circa 1920. She was later depicted on a collection of ceramic serving platters by Wedgwood, Josiah & Sons Inc., circa 1938.

Ann McKim appeared on a few paintings of 20th century British painter Montague Dawson. Most notable are The "Ann McKim" leaving Foochow for Home, circa 1960, sold at Christie's for $116,550 in 2013 and White Squall – Clipper Ship "Ann Mckim", sold for $68,500 to a private collector from Virginia in 2014.

She was printed with five sails per mast by 20th century artist Charles J. A. Wilson on Ann McKim of Baltimore – First American Clipper. Ann McKim was painted by the American painter John W. Schmidt in 1977, showing her at sea in the morning light. Two paintings of her by Danish-American artist Torsten Kruse appeared in a book about Fell's Point.
