= Memnon (clipper) =

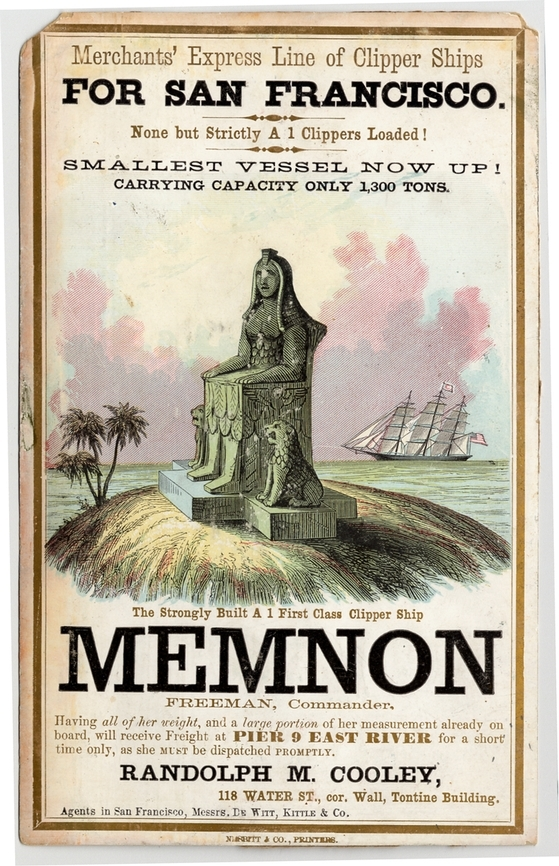

History

United States
- Name: Memnon
- Owner: Warren Delano II
- Builder: Smith & Dimon, New York City
- Launched: 1848
- Fate: Lost in the Gaspar Strait, 1851

General characteristics
- Class & type: Clipper
- Tons burthen: 1068 tons
- Length: 170 ft.
- Beam: 36 ft.
- Draft: 21 ft.
- Sail plan: Barque

The Memnon was the first clipper ship to arrive in San Francisco after the Gold Rush, and the only clipper to arrive in San Francisco before 1850. Built in 1848, she made record passages to San Francisco and to China, and sailed in the first clipper race around Cape Horn.

== Record passage to San Francisco ==
"The only clipper ship to make the voyage to San Francisco prior to 1850 was the Memnon, under Captain George Gordon, which arrived there July 28, 1849 after a record passage of one hundred and twenty days from New York."

Cutler lists this passage as 122 days, leaving New York April 11, 1849 under Capt. J.R. Gordon, and arriving in San Francisco on August 28, 1849.

"Era of the Clipper Ships" lists the captain's name as Joseph R. Gordon, and puts the voyage at 123 days, noting a mutiny en route:

"Gordon had it in his mind to set the record with this voyage around the Horn and was driving his new crew hard, and soon had a mutiny with "all hands refusing duty." Belaying pins and hand spikes were soon flying, and the Memnon was forced to put into Montevideo, where Gordon discharged the troublemakers. He took on a new crew before proceeding on the Memnon's record breaking voyage of 123 sailing days from Sandy Hook, arriving in San Francisco Bay on August 28, 1849."

=== Faster time than steamships ===
"In 1852 there were in commission the clipper ships Surprise, Celestial, Sea Witch, Samuel Russell, Staghound, George E. Webster, and barks Race Horse and Memnon, all of which had made the passage from New York to San Francisco in from ninety to one hundred and twenty days, the average steamer time being one hundred and fifty."

=== Record broken by Flying Cloud ===
"Memnon's record 120 day passage was broken again two years later by the Flying Cloud, which made her famous day’s run of 374 miles on that trip, arriving in San Francisco after 89 days, 21 hours."

== Construction ==
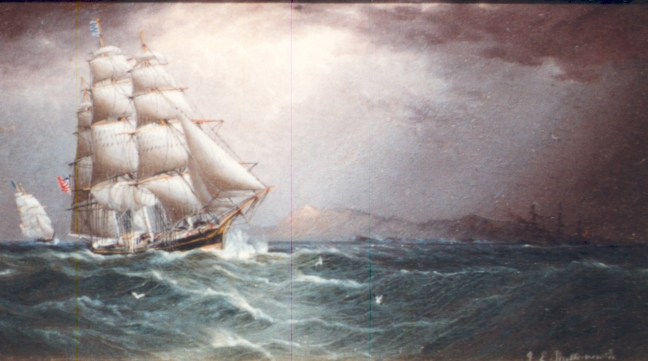
The Clipper Memnon of New York by James E. Buttersworth

The Memnon was a sharp, heavily sparred clipper much like the Sea Witch. She was designed by John Willis Griffiths at the Smith & Dimon yard in New York.

== Voyages: "I am now convinced the ship can sail" ==
"The Memnon had sailed on her maiden run to Liverpool on November 6, 1848, in fourteen days, seven hours, very good time", under Captain Pulaski Benjamin. She was the first American clipper to call at the Port of Liverpool.

In his Notes on Ships of the Past, Captain R.B. Forbes describes the following voyages in the Memnon:

"She crossed from San Francisco to Hong Kong in 1850 in 36 days, in charge of Captain Gordon. Captain L. M. Goldsborough was passenger in her, and spoke very highly of her performances.

This China passage was a record, according to Cutler; however, the New York Herald of January 24, 1853 stated that it ended in Whampoa rather than Hong Kong.

"On the 30th July, 1848, she left New York, under command of Oliver Eldridge, for Liverpool, and made the passage to Cape Lynas in 21 days; the winds were generally light, and the captain seems to have been disappointed in the sailing qualities of the ship; but on the 14th day out, in longitude 32°, the log says: — "At 1 P.M., made a sail ahead; at 5 passed her; at 7.30 she is hull down astern; she was the Woodside, an American ship;" and on the 19th she made 241, with a moderate south-west wind, and the log says: — "I am now convinced the ship can sail." The distance sailed was 3,413; the first 6 days she averaged only 77. Leaving Liverpool on the 6th of September, for New York, she went out by the north channel, and had much bad weather, and much reefing; was 23 days and 17 hours on the way, and logged 3,868."

== First Clipper Race Around the Horn, 1850 ==
"The keen rivalry between clippers led to races over thousands of miles of seas; and upon the result thousands of dollars were often wagered."

"The first contest of clippers around Cape Horn took place in 1850, between the Hoqua, the Sea Witch, Samuel Russell, and Memnon, old rivals on China voyages, and the new clippers Celestial, Mandarin, and Race Horse ... Large sums of money were wagered on the result, the four older vessels having established high reputations for speed. The Samuel Russell was commanded by Charles Low, previously of the Hoqua, while the Hoqua was now commanded by Captain McKenzie; Captain Gordon was again in the Memnon, and Captain George Fraser, who had sailed with Captain Waterman as chief mate.”

The Samuel Russell knocked eleven days off the record, arriving in San Francisco after 109 days from New York. Hoqua arrived next, in 120 days from New York, and the following day Sea Witch arrived after a 97-day passage, knocking an additional 12 days off the record. The performance of Sea Witch was particularly astonishing because she had rounded Cape Horn during the Antarctic midwinter.

"The remaining ships arrived in the following order: Memnon, 123 days, Celestial, 104 days, Race Horse, 109 days from Boston, and Mandarin, 126 days from New York-- all 'exceptionally fine passages,' average passages of the time being 159 days."

== 1852 Challenge to British Clippers for a Race Around the Horn ==
"On January 3, 1852, the Illustrated London News ... published a portrait of the Chrysolite accompanying an article in which it was stated that both the Chrysolite and the Stornoway had beaten the Surprise, and that the Chrysolite had completely beaten the Memnon during a race in the Gaspar Straits. The article caused a good deal of interest in the United States, and it caused the formation by a number of high-spirited young merchants and ship-owners at Boston of a society called the "American Navigation Club", which consisted of Daniel C. Bacon, President Thomas H. Perkins, John P. Cushing, William H. Boardman, John M. Forbes, Warren Delano, and Edward King. In due time they issued the following challenge ... 'The American Navigation Club challenges the ship builders of Great Britain to a ship-race, with cargo on board, to a port in China and back. One ship to be entered by each party, and to be named within a week of the start ... The stakes to be L10,00 a side ...' However, the challenge was not accepted."

== Loss of the ship ==
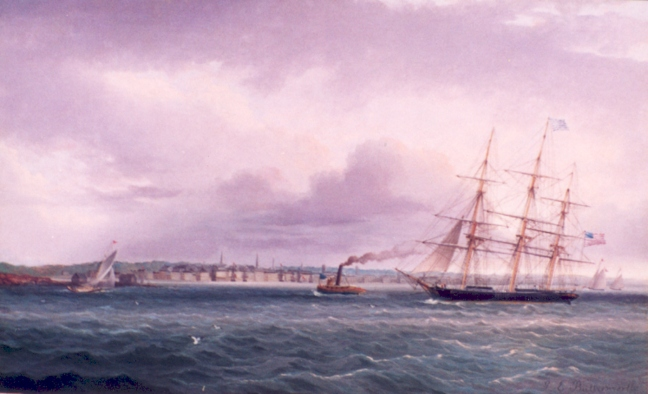
The Clipper Memnon Under Tow by James E. Buttersworth

The Memnon was one of fifteen American ships that sailed from China to London and Liverpool with cargoes of tea in 1851, of which four were clippers: Memnon, Surprise, Oriental and White Squall. Memnon left Whampoa August 16, 1851, and was lost in the Gaspar Strait, on September 14 or 16, near the Alceste Rock.

Charles Burr Todd cites a date of 1854 for the sinking, "After sailing the sea for twelve years was lost in 1854 with a cargo of 2,000,000 pounds of tea for London, for which she was to have had $70,000 freight." In his Journal of Voyages to China and their Return 1851-1853, Henry Blane described the circumstances of Memnon's loss:

“At sunrise the faint outlines of Gaspar Island could be seen and as we were running with a free wind 6 knots, by daylight were within 15 miles of it on our starboard bow. This is the Island where Capt. Gordon landed from the Memnon on Pulo Leat.

At 10 A.M. was abreast of Pulo Leat and could distinctly see the spot where Capt. Gordon ran Memnon ashore four months since. He was beating down through the Straits and was warned by his mate Mr. Fisher that he was standing too near in shore, and Capt. G.'s reply was, " he knew his business " — ten minutes after she struck. Capt. G. found it was impossible to get her off, and he with his wife and crew took to the boats — (the Malay pirates swarming up one side while they were going over the other) — and started for Gaspar Island which lay 25 miles north. The next day Mr. Fisher (mate) with one of the boats and a pair of sails with part of the crew started for Singapore bearing N.W. distance 300 miles. The first days run was 156 miles and two days after arrived at Singapore where he reported the loss of the Memnon. A vessel was sent for Capt. Gordon but he had put off 8 days after Mr. Fisher in the other boat for a ship which was coming down through the straits bound for Singapore where he and his wife and crew arrived without any further accident. By the following mail Capt. G and wife started overland to Boston where they belonged. This Island Pulo Lea has been the cause of a great many shipwrecks. It stands directly in the centre of the passage through which a 5 knot current is constantly running, changing its direction once in six months with the Monsoon. The passage is about two miles wide and bounded on the opposite side by shoals.

== 1858 ship Memnon ==
United States
- Name: Memnon (1858)
- Builder: E.H. & O. Briggs, South Boston
- Launched: 1858

General characteristics
- Class & type: Clipper
- Tons burthen: 789.34 tons
- Length: 158 ft. 3 in.
- Beam: 32 ft. 11 in.
- Draft: 22 ft.

An 1858 ship of clipper construction named Memnon, somewhat less heavily sparred, was built by E.H. & O Briggs in South Boston. She sailed from Boston under Captain Perez Jenkins on August 30, 1858, arriving in San Francisco on January 18, after a voyage of 159 days.

== See also ==
- California Gold Rush
- John W. Griffiths
- Colossi of Memnon
- Houqua (clipper)
- Sea Witch (clipper)
