= Senator McKim =

Senator McKim may refer to:

- Alexander McKim (1748–1832), Maryland State Senate
- Isaac McKim (1775–1838), Maryland State Senate
