= Race Horse =

1850 merchant sailing ship

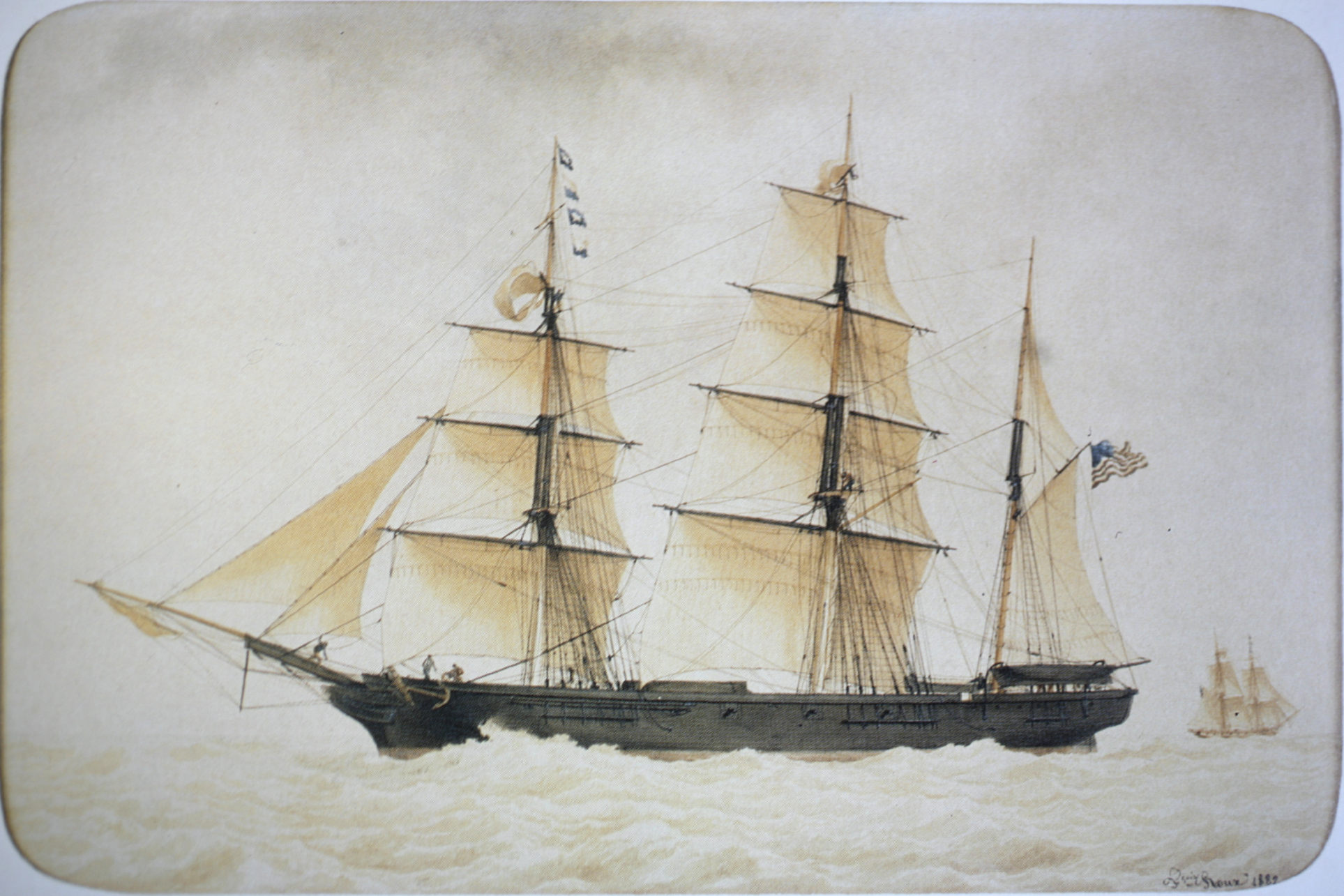

History

United States
- Name: Race Horse
- Owner: J.M. Forbes, I. Goddard & Co., Boston
- Builder: Samuel Hall, East Boston
- Launched: June 1850
- Fate: Vanished early 1865
- Notes: Designed by Samuel Hall; sometimes attributed to Samuel H. Pook

General characteristics
- Tons burthen: 512/530 tons
- Length: 128 ft. LOA
- Beam: 30 ft. 6 in.
- Draft: 16 ft.
- Notes: 1 deck and hold beams partially decked

Race Horse was an 1850 clipper barque. She set a record of 109 days from New York to San Francisco during the first Clipper Race around the Horn.

== Construction ==
Race Horse was similar to a barque built by Samuel Hall a few years earlier, Coquette. The design of Race Horse has been credited to both Samuel Hartt Pook and to Hall. According to a letter written by Hall to the "Boston Daily Atlas", he asked Pook to make the models and molds for Race Horse based on Coquette, with a few modifications, in order to help Pook to "get his name before the public".

== First Clipper Race Around the Horn, 1850 ==
Race Horse performed well in the First Clipper Race Around the Horn, which took place in 1850. Race Horse sailed from Boston to San Francisco in 109 days (or 94 days, 14 hours land to land). She made Cape Horn just 52 days out on this trip, 20 miles offshore.

"The keen rivalry between clippers led to races over thousands of miles of seas; and upon the result thousands of dollars were often wagered."

The new clippers Race Horse, Celestial, and Mandarin challenged Hoqua, Sea Witch, Samuel Russell, and Memnon, which were old rivals in the China trade.

"Large sums of money were wagered on the result, the four older vessels having established high reputations for speed. The Samuel Russell was commanded by Charles Low, previously of the Hoqua, while the Hoqua was now commanded by Captain McKenzie; Captain Gordon was again in the Memnon, and Captain George Fraser, who had sailed with Captain Waterman as chief mate."

Samuel Russell knocked eleven days off the record, arriving first in San Francisco after 109 days from New York. Race Horse would also make a 109-day passage, but it was Hoqua that arrived next, having made a 120-day trip from New York. The following day Sea Witch arrived after a 97-day passage, knocking an additional 12 days off the record. The performance of Sea Witch was particularly astonishing because she had rounded Cape Horn during the Antarctic midwinter.

"The remaining ships arrived in the following order: Memnon, 123 days, Celestial, 104 days, Race Horse, 109 days from Boston, and Mandarin, 126 days from New York-- all 'exceptionally fine passages,' average passages of the time being 159 days."

== Voyage to Turkey ==
On August 8, 1851, Race Horse sailed from Boston to Smyrna, Turkey under the command of Captain Searles, with several passengers who were en route with their wives to work as missionaries in Armenia: Sanford Richardson, Edwin Goodell, and Benjamin Parsons.
