= SS Fulton =

Wooden hulled, brig-rigged, sidewheel steamer built in 1855

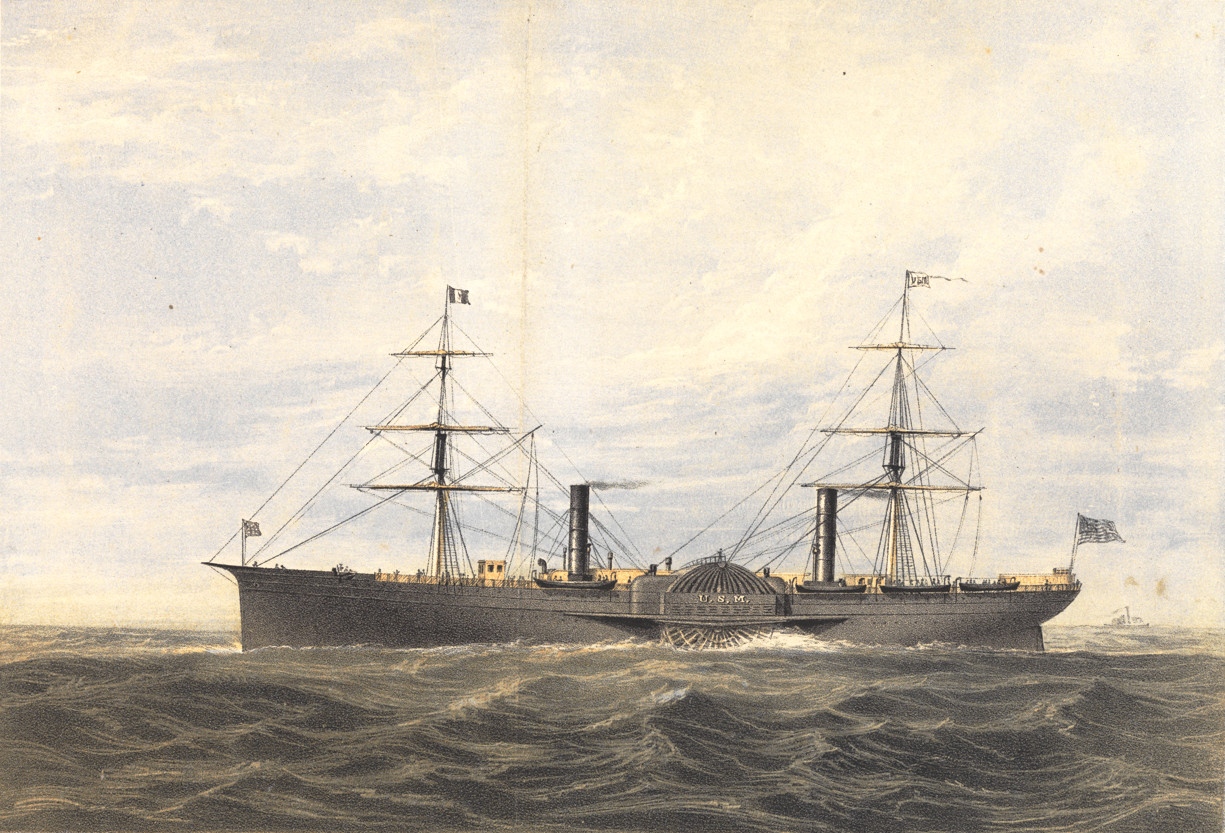
- U.S. Mail Steamer Fulton, J. A. Wotten, Commander.

History

United States
- Name: Fulton
- Namesake: Robert Fulton, American engineer and inventor
- Owner: New York & Havre Steam Navigation Company
- Operator: J. A. Wotten, J. K. Mitchell, C. H. Townsend, J. B. Hildreth
- Port of registry: United States 1855-1869
- Builder: Smith and Dimon Shipyard
- Launched: September 4, 1855
- Completed: 1855
- Maiden voyage: September 4, 1855
- Fate: Sold
- Notes: She had three decks, could accommodate 300 first-and second-class passengers

General characteristics
- Type: Wooden-hull Sidewheel steamer
- Tonnage: 2,500 GRT
- Length: 290 ft 0 in (88.39 m)
- Beam: 42 ft 5 in (12.93 m)
- Depth of hold: 31 ft 5 in (9.58 m)
- Installed power: Two oscillating steam engine by Morgan Iron Works of New York
- Propulsion: Iron Paddle Wheels, 33 feet diameter
- Speed: 12 knots (22 km/h)

Fulton was a wooden-hulled, brig-rigged, sidewheel steamer built in 1855 by the Smith and Dimon Shipyard at New York City for the New York & Havre Steam Navigation Company. She was chartered by the Union Army in the Army Transport Service, during the American Civil War. She returned to transatlantic passenger and freight service after the Civil War.

== Construction ==
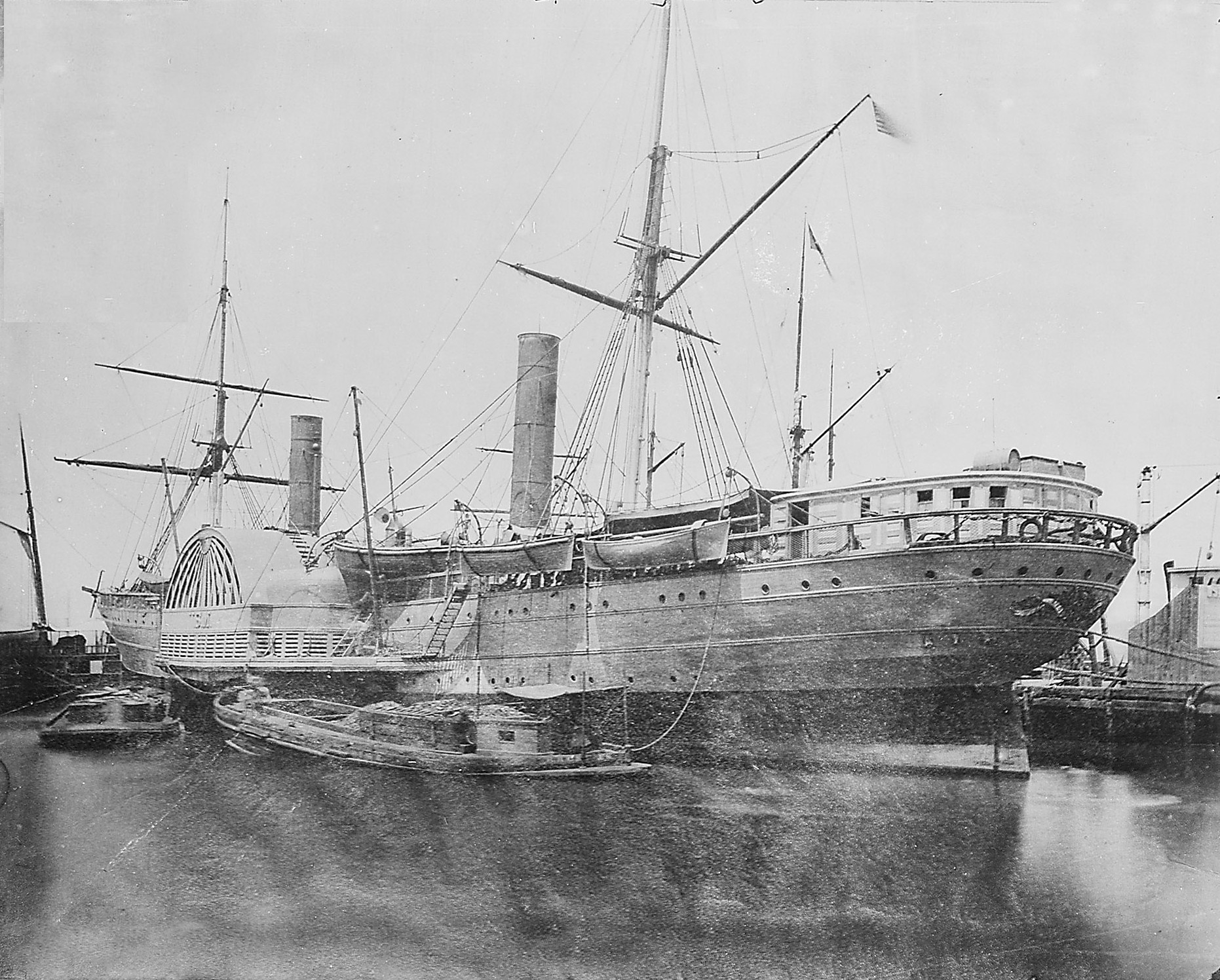
SS Fulton (1855) sidewheel steamship.

The Fulton was built in 1855, by Smith and Dimon Shipyard of New York. She was launched on September 4, 1855. Her sister ship Arago was built by Westervelt & Sons. They were both constructed in 1855 for the New York & Havre Steam Navigation Company, then under contract with the United States Government to deliver mail between New York and Le Havre, France. Both were named for steamship pioneers. Fulton's namesake was Robert Fulton (1765–1815), an American engineer and inventor. Both were considered great improvements to their predecessors of the era. Their design included oscillating engines, water tight bulkheads, and wire bulwarks, to reinforce the sides against the force of rough seas. She could accommodate 300 first and second class passengers, 700 tons of freight and 800 tons of coal.

The Fulton, was registered with the ‘’Record of American and Foreign Shipping,’’ from 1858 to 1869. Her ship master was Captain J. A. Wotten; her owners were N.Y & Havre Steam Navigation Company; built in 1855 at New York; and her hailing port was the Port of New York.

== Service history ==
The Fulton sailed on her first voyage on February 9, 1856, as a transatlantic mail steamer for Havre Steam Navigation Company, transporting passengers, cargo, mail, and specie between her home port of Southampton, New York, to Liverpool, England and Le Havre, France.

Due to the outbreak of the American Civil War, government contracted mail service ceased operation. The Fulton's last voyage, as a mail carrier, was on March 30, 1861.

=== American Civil War ===
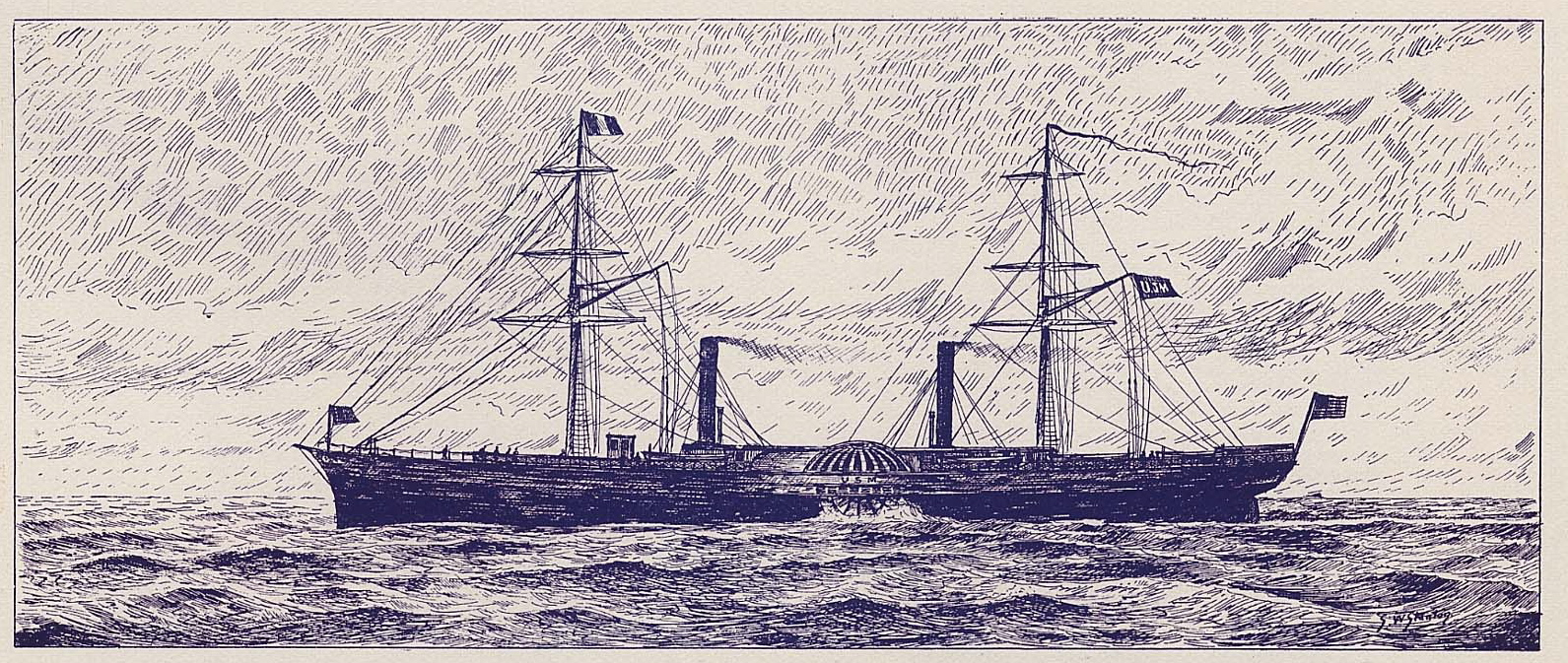
Fulton (steamship 1855), painting by Samuel Ward Stanton.

Between 1861 and 1865, Fulton was chartered by the U. S. Department of War in the Army Transport Service, for use as an army transport, at a cost of 1,200 dollars per day. She made trips from New York to ports on the Southern coast. Captain J. A. Wotton and thousands of military men traveled with her on these excursions. She worked in operations with the South Atlantic Blockading Squadron throughout the war.

On April 15, 1865, the steamer Fulton left New York to Port Royal, South Carolina with the news of the death of President Abraham Lincoln. She hoisted her flag half-mast. The news of the assassination of the President fell with sorrow upon the officers at Port Royal, South Carolina. On June 29, 1865, the steamer Fulton arrived in New York from Portal Royal with the 14th Regiment. The Fulton continued in her troop, equipment and mail transport role through the end of the war.

=== Postwar ===
Following the war in 1865, she was put back on the New York and Havre route under the command of Captain Samuel Samuels, that was captain of famous clipper ship Dreadnought. The Fulton continued with this line until the fall of 1867, when she was withdrawn from service.

In 1868–1869, Fulton and her sister ship Arago were chartered briefly by the Ruger Brothers for passenger service. However, without government subsidized mail service, both ships proved too costly for this purpose, given the stiff competition from more efficient screw steamers and European competitors. The Fulton was later used in the Hospital Transport Service, at the New York quarantine station.

== End of service ==
In 1869, the Fulton was deemed to be unseaworthy and was broken up and sold for scrap.
