= Smith and Dimon Shipyard =

Renowned shipyard on the east side of Manhattan

Coordinates: 40.7202°N 73.9739°W

Smith & Dimon
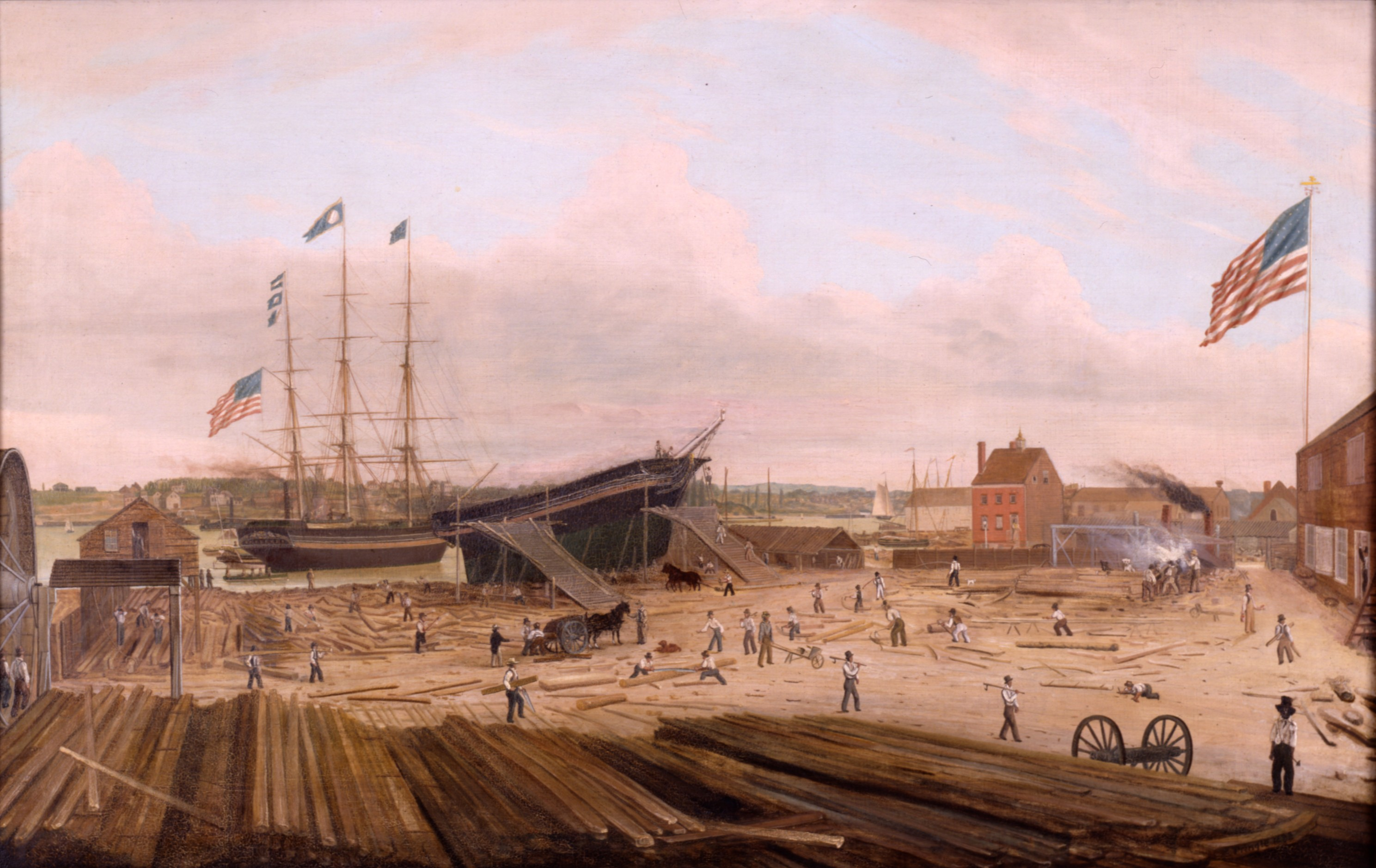
- Smith & Dimon Shipyard, 1833 by James Pringle
- Formerly: Blossom, Smith and Dimon; Smith, Dimon and Comstock
- Industry: Shipyard
- Headquarters: Manhattan, New York, United States
- Key people: John W. Griffiths, naval architect
- Products: Clipper ships, steamships
- Services: Ship construction and repair
- Owners: Stephen Smith and John Dimon

Smith and Dimon Shipyard or just Smith & Dimon was a renowned shipyard on the east side of Manhattan during the 1840s.

== History ==
The shipyard was located along the East River between 4th and 5th Street. It was founded by partners Stephen Smith (1794–1875) and John Dimon (1795–1879). Dimon was in charge of the more profitable ship repair business and described the partnership saying, "Smith builds the ships, I make the money." John W. Griffiths was a famed naval architect who designed revolutionary, fast clipper ships for Smith & Dimon. The shipyard became famous for its work in the 1840s under the name Smith & Dimon. It was formerly Blossom, Smith and Dimon in the 1820s and then Smith, Dimon and Comstock in the 1830s.

In addition to clipper ships, the shipyard also built steamships, including the 1848 steamship Oregon.

James Pringle painted the shipyard in 1833. The painting is on display at the Fenimore Art Museum.

== Ships built at Smith & Dimon ==
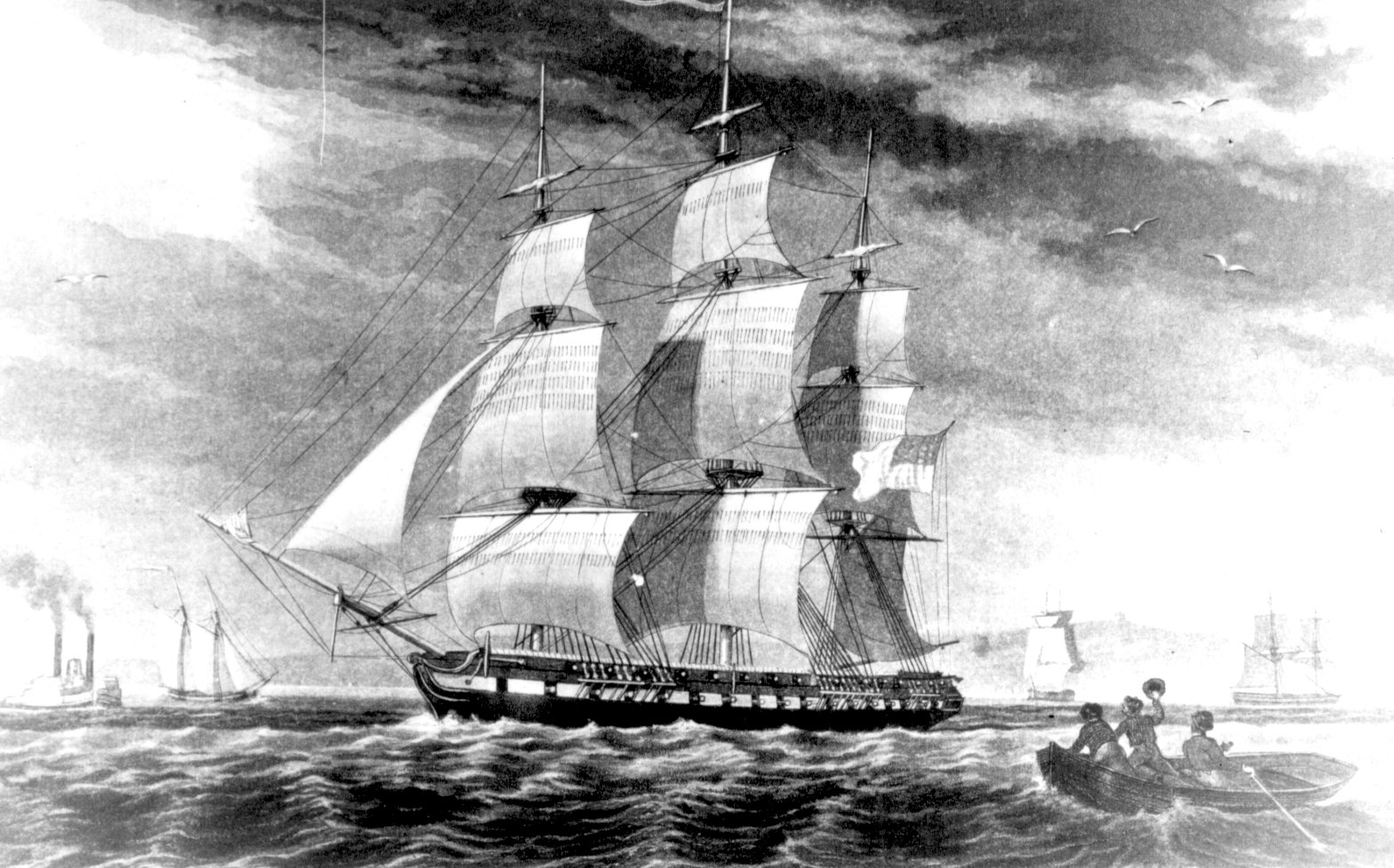
The Liberator

- Liberator, 1826. (Later named Hudson)
- Mary Howland, 500 ton, noted for its size.
- Roscoe, Packet boat
- Independence, 1834 Packet boat
- Rainbow, 1845. Said to be the first extreme clipper.
- Sea Witch, 1846, a model for American fast clippers.
- Oregon, 1848
- Memnon, 1848
- Arago, 1855
- Fulton, 1855
