= Rainbow (clipper) =

American cargo ship

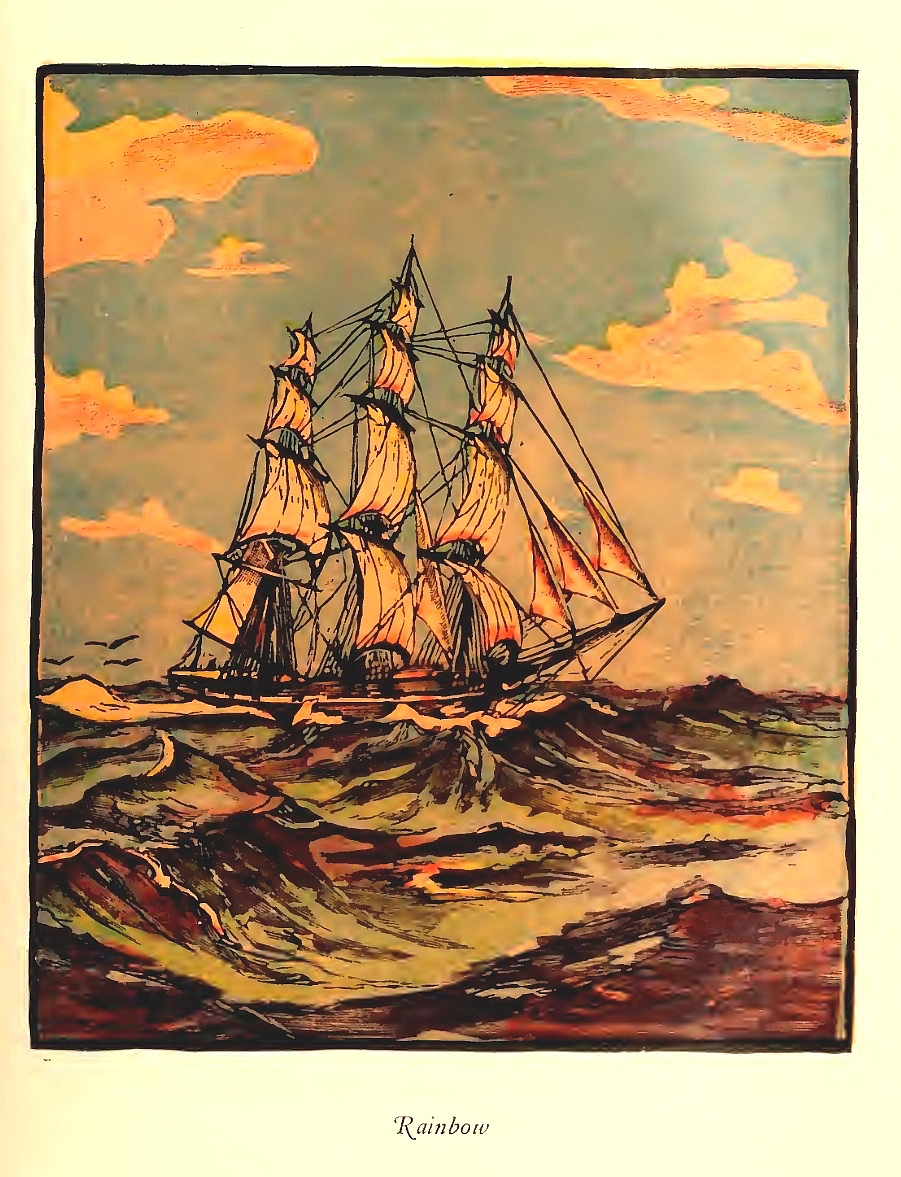
- Clipper Ship Rainbow

History

United States
- Name: Rainbow
- Owner: Howland & Aspinwall
- Builder: Smith & Dimon, New York
- Launched: 1845
- Fate: Disappeared on or after 17 March 1848

General characteristics
- Class & type: clipper
- Tonnage: 757 tons OM
- Length: 159 ft 0 in (48.46 m)
- Beam: 31 ft 10 in (9.70 m)
- Draft: 18 ft 4 in (5.59 m)
- Propulsion: Sails

Rainbow, launched in New York in 1845 to sail in the China trade for the firm Howland & Aspinwall, was a clipper, a type of sailing vessel designed to sacrifice cargo capacity for speed.

== An early clipper ship ==
Rainbow was an early clipper ship. It was built in 1845, in accordance with John W. Griffiths' ideas, and followed by Sea Witch the next year. Both of the vessels are cited as being highly influential in subsequent U.S. merchant hull design. Though initial opinions were that Rainbow would sink during its first trip, its subsequent success led to a rush to adopt the new design in shipbuilding across Boston, New York, Philadelphia and British manufacturing companies.

Its design was created around the concept of sacrificing cargo capacity in favour of speed. As per Griffiths' ideas, it featured a lengthening of the bow above water, a drawing out and sharpening of the forward body, and the greatest breadth further aft (further aft than earlier designs, not further aft than forward). These modifications had the effect of minimizing water resistance. He allegedly formulated his design after studying the lines of the owner's previous ship, the Ann McKim.

== Design and construction ==
=== Clipper bow ===
Rainbow was launched in 1845. She created a sensation while still on the stocks because of her concave or hollowed lines forward, which opposed the tradition and practice of shipbuilding of the time.

"The sharp model of Rainbow gave rise to a great deal of discussion while she was on the stocks in course of construction. It was generally admitted by the recognized shipping authorities of South Street, that she was a handsome vessel, but whether she could be made to sail was a question on which there were varieties of opinion." "Her bow with its concave waterlines and the greatest breadth at a point considerably further aft than had hitherto been regarded as practicable, was a radical departure, differing not merely in degree but in kind from any ship that preceded her. One critical observer declared that her bow had been turned " outside in," and that her whole form was contrary to the laws of nature."

By 1930, looking back on the clipper era, the bow appeared much less shocking than it did at the time. Cutler writes,

“The Rainbow represented a certain departure from fast-sailing models of her day but she was far from being a radically new type ... However, her appearance as she gradually took shape on the stocks aroused so much criticism that her owners delayed her completion for more than a year. She was, perhaps, the first ship of the extremely hollow bow type, and in spite of the fact that very similar lines had been incorporated in pilot boats for years, old wiseacres grumbled that her bows were 'turned inside out.'"

=== Hull ===
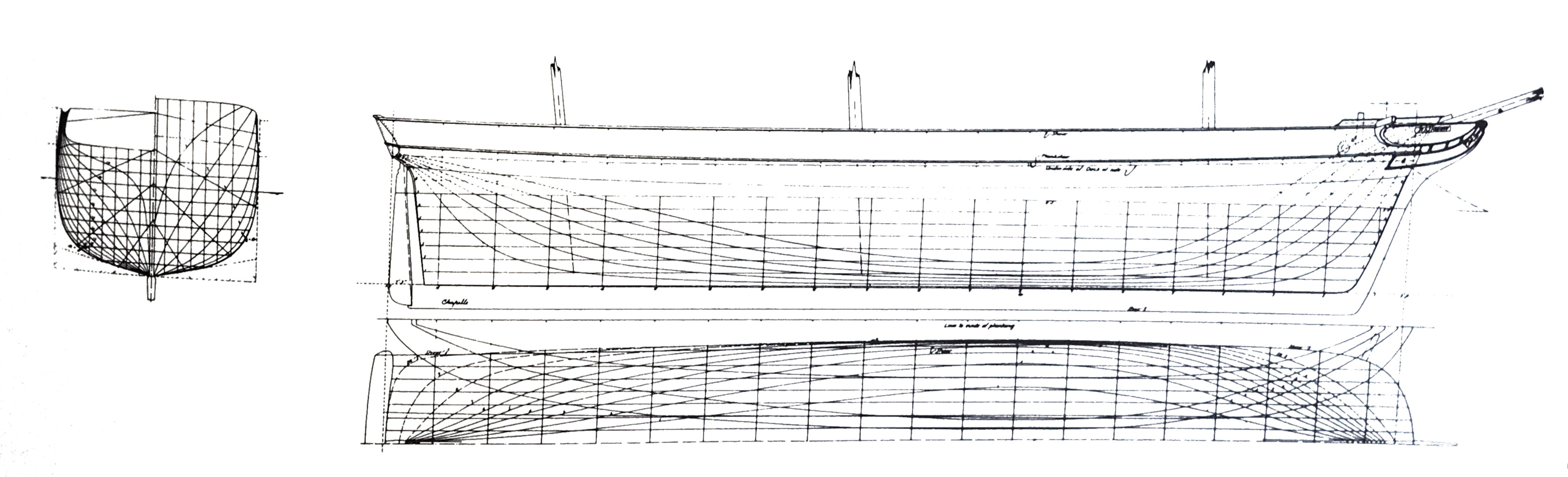
plans and elevation of Rainbow.

"Perhaps it was the ongoing philosophical contest between the proponents of the traditional flat-footed vessel, as staunchly favored by Nathaniel B. Palmer, and those who were swayed toward the sharp-bottomed vessels championed by John W. Griffiths in the form of Sea Witch and Rainbow, both vessels of remarkable performance and far-flung reputation."

"In 1841, John W. Griffeths [sic], of New York, proposed several improvements in marine architecture, which were embodied in the model of a clipper ship exhibited at the American Institute, in February of that year. Later he delivered a series of lectures on the science of ship-building, which were the first discourses upon this subject in the United States. Mr. Griffeths advocated carrying the stem forward in a curved line, thereby lengthening the bow above water; he also introduced long, hollow water-lines and a general drawing out and sharpening of the forward body, bringing the greatest breadth further aft. Another improvement which he proposed was to fine out the after body by rounding up the ends of the main transom, thus relieving the quarters and making the stern much lighter and handsomer above the water-line."

=== Masts ===
"Mr. Griffeths [sic] relates a good story about the masting of this vessel. It appears that Mr. Aspinwall, who had an excellent idea of what a ship ought to be, had come to the conclusion that the masting of vessels was a question of no small moment in shipbuilding, and determined that his new ship should have the benefit of foreign aid in placing the masts. Accordingly, he informed the builders that he would obtain assistance from abroad, for their benefit as well as his own. The builders naturally paid little attention to this information. The port-captain, who was appointed to superintend the construction, was directed by Mr. Aspinwall to select the best authorities in Europe on masting ships. The European experts were written to in reference to this important matter, and after they had duly considered the principal dimensions of the vessel, the trade in which she was to be employed, etc., a paper draft and elaborate calculations were prepared and forwarded to New York."

In the meantime, the construction of the Rainbow had progressed steadily.

"The clamps being ready, the deck beams were placed according to the original drawings, the framing of the decks completed, hatches and mast partners framed, channels and mast-steps secured; the masts and yards were also made and the ship planked and caulked by the time the important despatches arrived."

"They were examined by the port-captain, Mr. Aspinwall was informed that they were all right, and the port-captain was requested to give the information to the builders, which, of course, was done. The ship, however, was finished without the slightest alteration from the original plans. Mr. Aspinwall, who never doubted that his pet project had been carefully carried out, attributed much of the success of this vessel to the placing of her masts by foreign rules."

== Performance ==
Rainbow proved to be an excellent ship in every way, most importantly she was tremendously fast."

Rainbow carried a great deal of canvas.

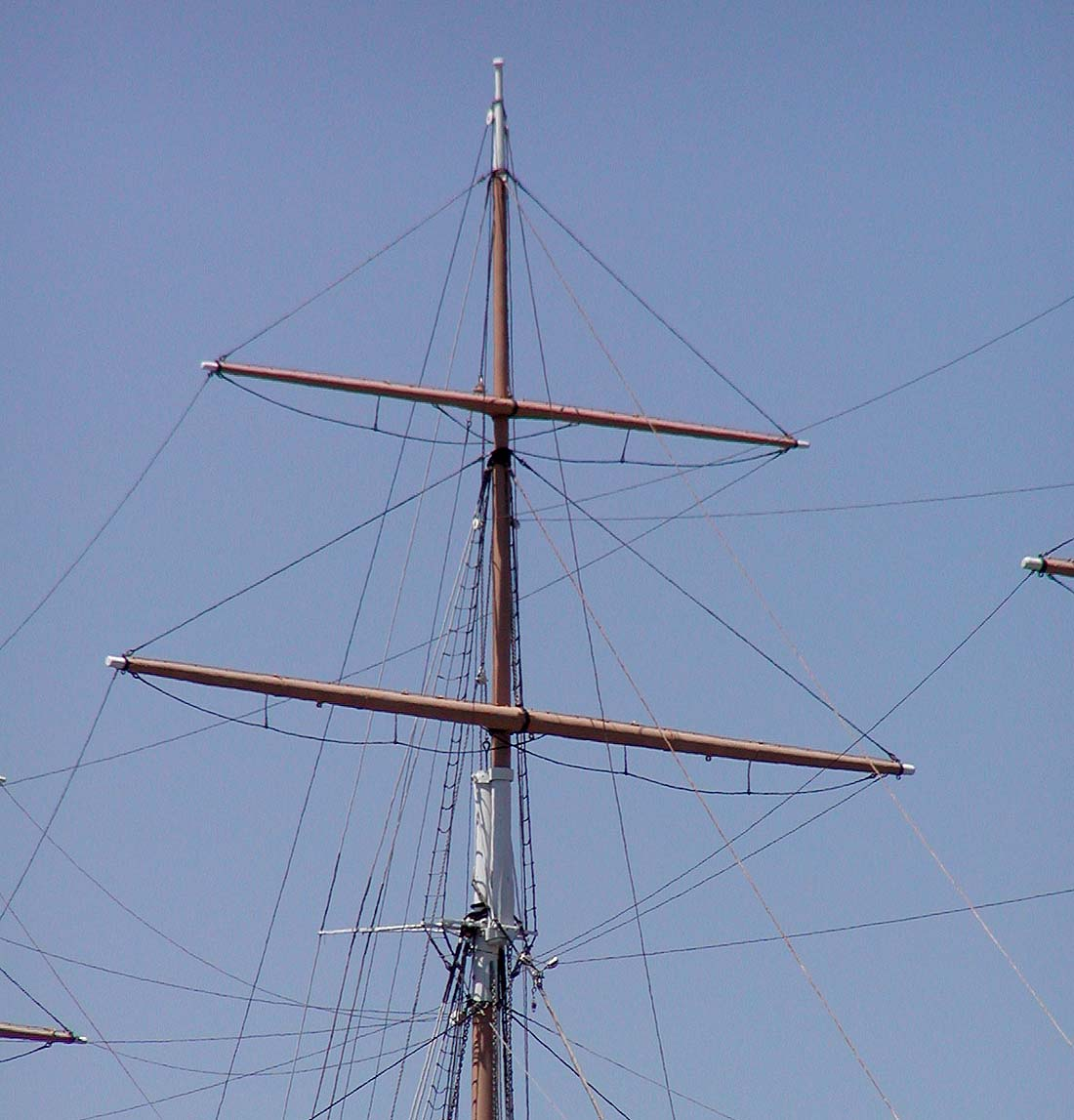
Main topgallant mast

On her maiden voyage, Captain Land had sailed her so aggressively that just four days after leaving New York her top gallant masts came out. She was nearly lost. Rainbow returned to New York on 19 September 1845 with a new record of 7 months and 17 days for the round trip. In the process of setting this record, Rainbow's remaining set of sails had been blown out, necessitating ten days of repairs while underway.

At this point, even the captain had to acknowledge that his exciting new vessel was somewhat oversparred. Land decided to have three feet cut off the height of the masts. This decision seemed to work out well, without negatively impacting the performance of the ship.

On her second voyage to China the Rainbow went out against the northeast monsoon in just ninety-two days and came home to New York in eighty-eight on 29 February 1848, demonstrating her ability to sail windward well. Only very few square-riggers of that or any other time were able to perform better than her.

== Disappearance ==
On March 17, 1848, Sea Witch arrived in New York, setting the all-time record of 77 days from Canton to the US.

That same day, Rainbow sailed from New York on her fifth voyage, bound for Valparaíso and China, under Captain Hayes.

The ship was never heard from again, and it was assumed that she foundered off Cape Horn.

== Voyages ==
Rainbow made five voyages. She sailed from New York to Hong Kong, with return voyages from Whampoa to New York, making passages of 84–108 days, under Captain John Land.

"Her second voyage to China out and home, was made in six months and fourteen days, including two weeks in port discharging and loading cargo. She went out to China against the northeast monsoon in ninety-two and home in eighty-eight days, bringing the news of her own arrival at Canton. (Another source adds two days to this voyage: "the unprecedented time of 6 months and 16 days.")

"Captain John Land, her able and enthusiastic commander, declared that she was the fastest ship in the world, and this was undeniably true; finding no one to differ from him, he further gave it as his opinion that no ship could be built to outsail the Rainbow, and it is also true that [as of 1912] very few vessels have ever broken her record." Captain Land had a "reputation for taciturnity," and had spent many years in slower ships with bluff bows, such as Globe).

In 1847, Captain Land was succeeded by Captain Hayes.

Rainbow's fastest passage was in 1846, between Whampoa and New York, in 88 days.

== Painting ==
- The American clipper Rainbow leaving New York, Henry Scott (British, 1911–1966)

The bottom was painted green to distinguish it from other boats.

== See also ==
- Clipper
- Howland & Aspinwall
- John W. Griffiths
- Sea Witch
