= Linden Hill United Methodist Cemetery =

Cemetery in Ridgewood, Queens, New York City

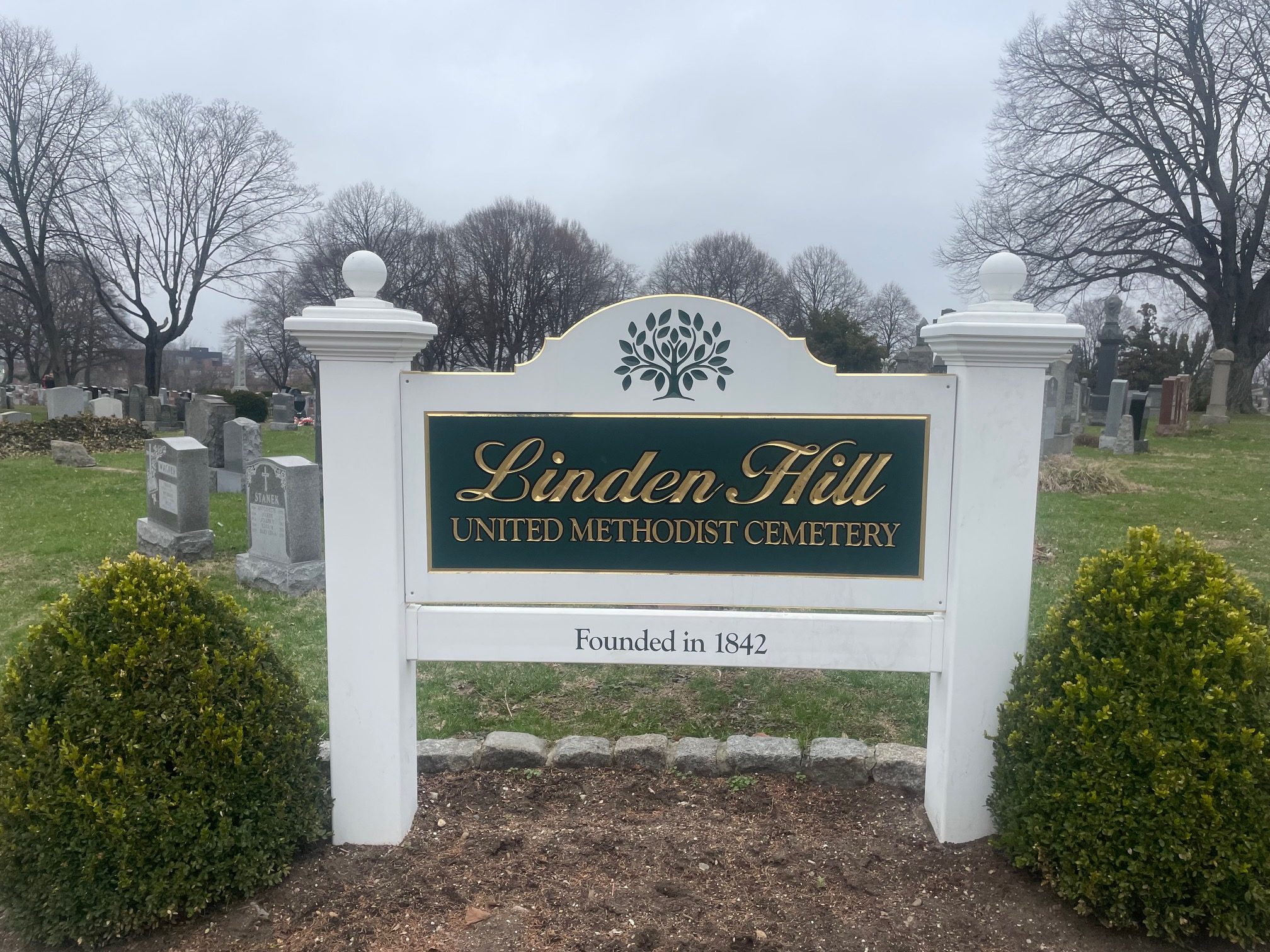
- Interactive map of Linden Hill United Methodist Cemetery

Details
- Established: 1842
- Location: Ridgewood, Queens
- Country: United States
- Coordinates: 40°42′38″N 73°54′48″W

Linden Hill United Methodist Cemetery is a nonsectarian cemetery in Ridgewood, Queens founded in 1842.

== History ==
The Second Street Methodist Episcopal Church, an English-speaking Methodist congregation in Manhattan, established the cemetery at Linden Hill in 1842. Ten years later, the site was acquired by the First German Methodist Episcopal Mission Church. The cemetery was incorporated in 1977 and is officially nonsectarian.

== Notable burials ==
- John W. Griffiths (1809–1882), naval architect
