= Alexander McKim =

American politician (1748–1832)

Member of the U.S. House of Representatives from Maryland's 5th district
- In office March 4, 1809 – March 3, 1815
- Preceded by: William McCreery
- Succeeded by: William Pinkney

Personal details
- Born: January 10, 1748 Brandywine, Delaware Colony, British America
- Died: January 18, 1832 (aged 84) Baltimore, Maryland, U.S.
- Resting place: Green Mount Cemetery
- Party: Democratic-Republican Party
- Relatives: Isaac McKim (nephew)

Military service
- Unit: Baltimore Independent Cadets; First Baltimore Cavalry

Alexander McKim (January 10, 1748 – January 18, 1832) was a U.S. representative from Maryland.

== Biography ==
McKim was born in Brandywine in the Delaware Colony. His nephew was Isaac McKim. After pursuing an academic course he moved to Baltimore, Maryland, and served as a member of the Maryland House of Delegates in 1778. He served in the Revolutionary War as a member of the Baltimore Independent Cadets and of the First Baltimore Cavalry. He also fought under Lafayette in the Virginia campaign of 1781. After the war, he served as member of the Maryland Senate from 1806 to 1810.

McKim was elected as a Democratic-Republican to the Eleventh, Twelfth, and Thirteenth Congresses, where he served from March 4, 1809, to March 3, 1815. After Congress, he engaged in mercantile pursuits. He also served as justice of court of quarter sessions, and was presiding judge of the Baltimore County Orphans' Court at the time of his death in Baltimore. He is interred in Greenmount Cemetery.

U.S. House of Representatives
Preceded by William McCreery	Member of the U.S. House of Representatives from Maryland's 5th congressional district 1809 - 1815	Succeeded by William Pinkney
