= Helena (packet sailboat) =

Packet ship

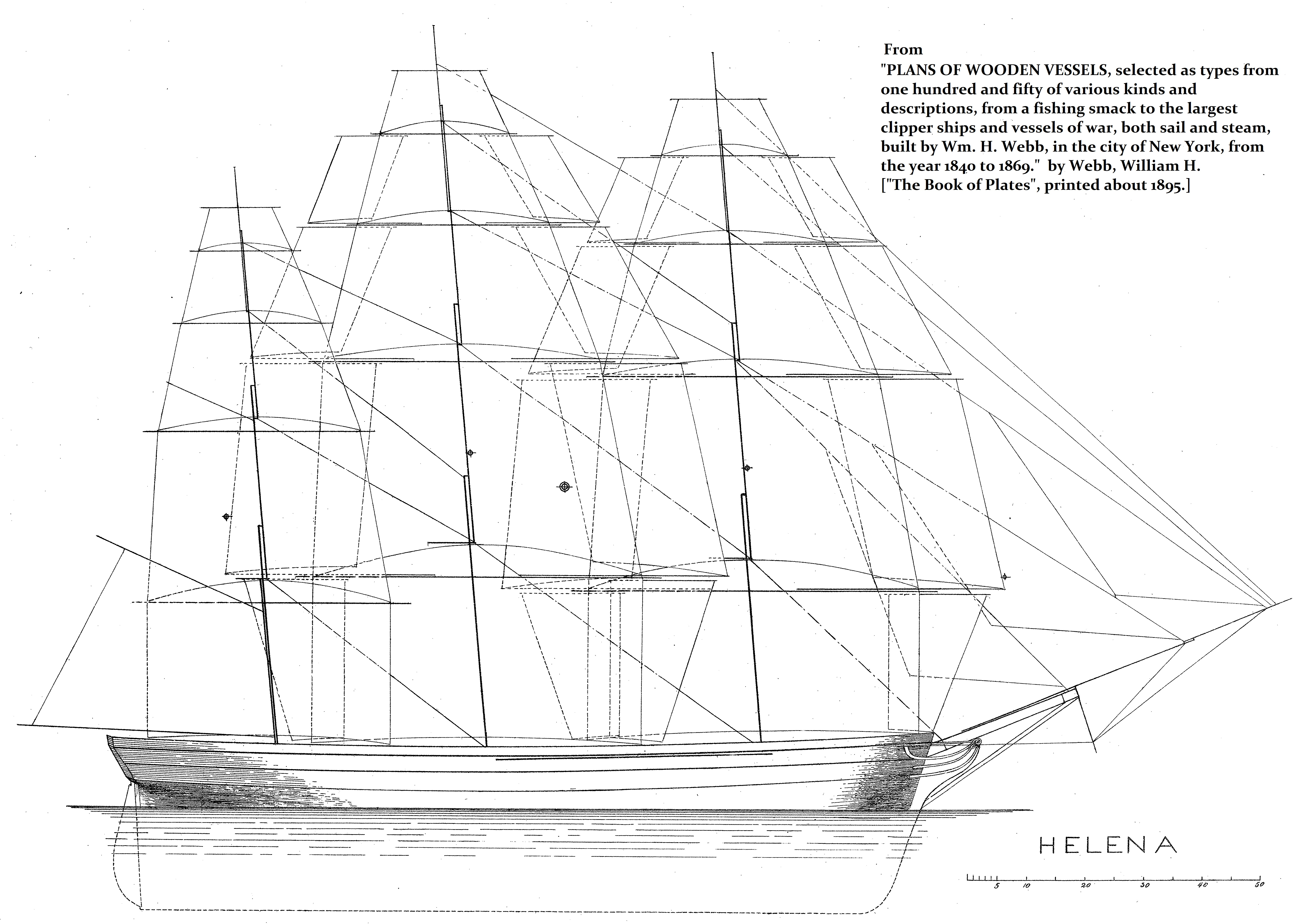
- Spars & sails of Helena

History

United States
- Name: Helena
- Owner: N. L. and G. Griswold
- Builder: William H. Webb
- Launched: 1841
- Fate: Lost at sea in 1857

General characteristics
- Type: Packet
- Tonnage: 598 OM
- Length: 134 ft 6 in (41.00 m)
- Beam: 31 ft 4 in (9.55 m)
- Draft: 20 ft (6.1 m)
- Propulsion: Sails

Helena was a China packet built by William H. Webb in 1841. Helena is often called a "pre-clipper" or "early clipper ship", type of the fast ships that were a precursor to the fast clippers that dominated the China trade routes for years to follow.

== History ==
Helena was owned by N. L. and G. Griswold and sailed in the China trade under the command of Captain Deliverance P. Benjamin.

== Passages ==
In 1841, Helena commanded by Captain Deliverance P. Benjamin made an 83-day passage from New York to Valparaíso, Chile in 83 days. Helena made two long stop in Chile and then in Lima, Peru, before sailing to China. She docked at Macao on June 15, 1842 after 68 at sea. She rested in Macao until September 2, 1842, when she sailed to New York in less than 106 days, arriving there on December 21, 1842.

In 1843, Helena made a record by sailing from ValpaValparaísoraiso to Canton, China in 51 days. She returned to New York the following year from Canton in 90 days.

In 1846, Helena sailed from New York to Java in just 73 days and 20 hours, averaging 183 miles a day.

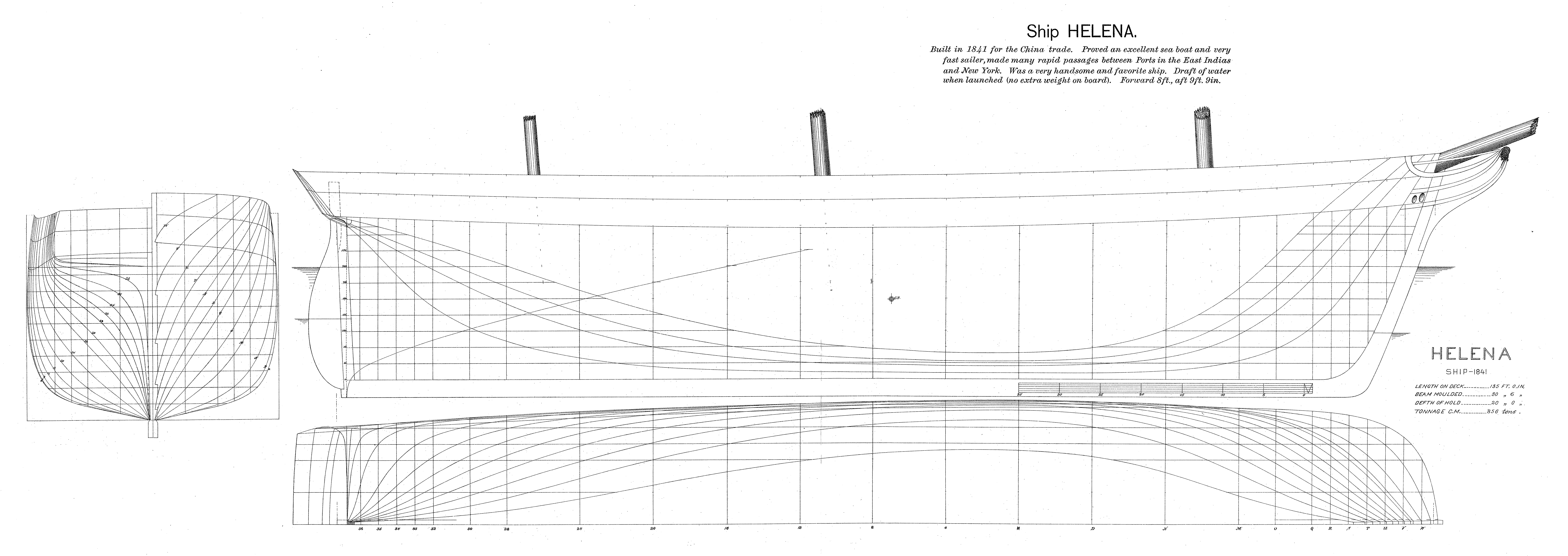

== Final Fate ==
She was lost at sea in 1857 under command of Captain Thompson on her passage from China to Havana.
