= Isaac McKim =

American politician (1775–1838)

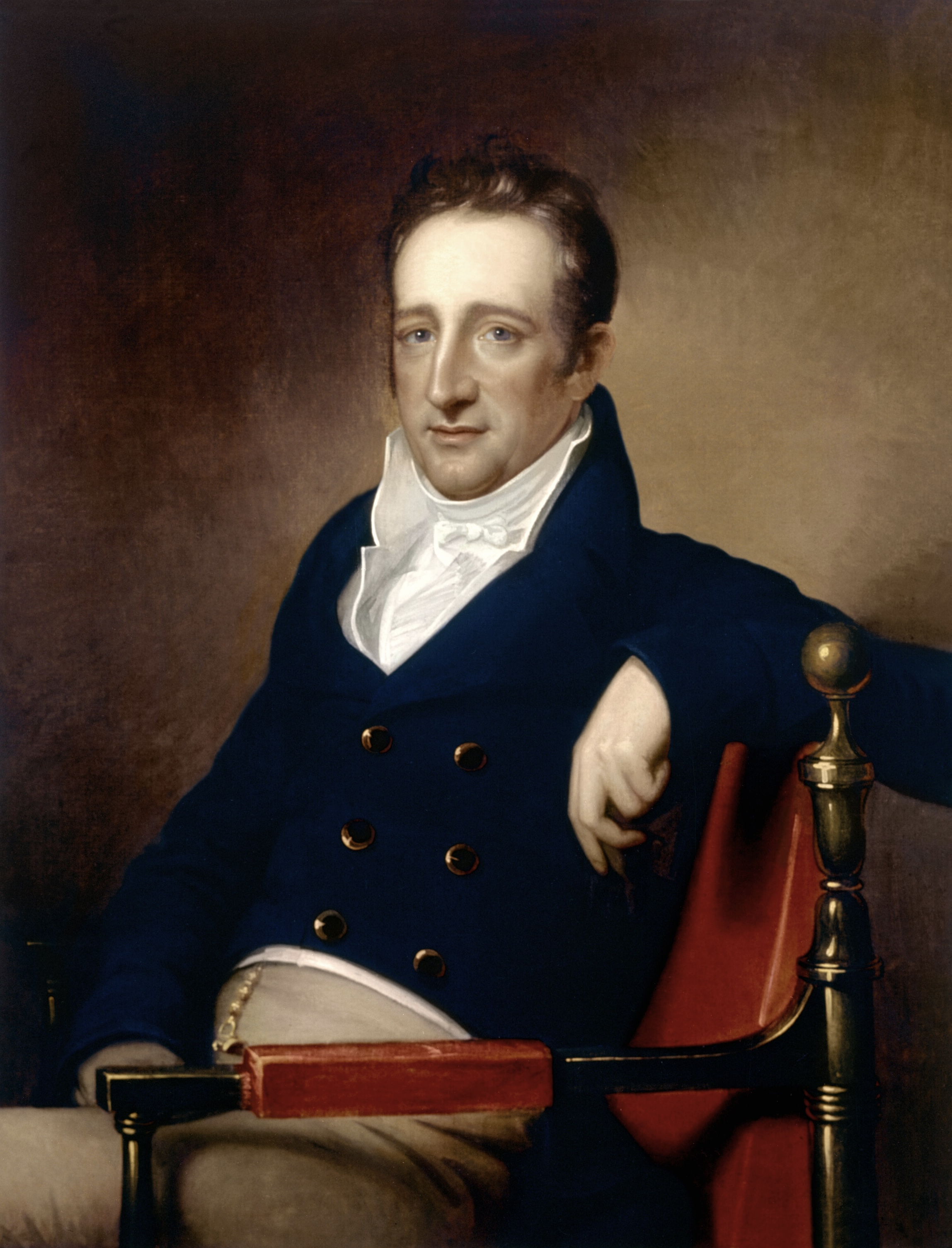
- Portrait by Rembrandt Peale, c. 1815

Member of the U.S. House of Representatives from Maryland
- In office January 4, 1823 – March 3, 1825
- Preceded by: Samuel Smith
- Succeeded by: John Barney
- Constituency: 5th district
- In office March 4, 1833 – April 1, 1838
- Preceded by: Multi-member constituency
- Succeeded by: John P. Kennedy
- Constituency: 5th district (1833–1835); 4th district (1835–1838)

Personal details
- Born: July 21, 1775 Baltimore, Province of Maryland, British America
- Died: April 1, 1838 (aged 62) Baltimore, Maryland, U.S.
- Resting place: Old Saint Paul's Cemetery
- Spouse: Ann McKim (before 1838)
- Children: None
- Parent: John McKim
- Relatives: William Duncan (brother); John McKim Jr. (cousin); Alexander McKim (uncle);
- Occupation: Politician, Merchant
- Known for: U.S. Representative from Maryland; owner of the Baltimore clipper AnnMcKim

Isaac McKim (July 21, 1775 – April 1, 1838) was a U.S. representative from Maryland, nephew of Alexander McKim. McKim's five terms as a congressman saw him change parties three times (from Republican to Jackson Republican to Jacksonian).

== Early life ==
McKim was born in Baltimore in the Province of Maryland. He attended the public schools, and later engaged in mercantile pursuits. He served in the War of 1812 as aide-de-camp to General Samuel Smith.

== Political career ==
After the war, McKim served as a member of the Maryland Senate from December 4, 1821, until January 8, 1823, when he resigned.

McKim was elected as a Democrat to the Seventeenth Congress to fill the vacancy caused by the resignation of Samuel Smith. On the same day, McKim was elected as a Jackson Republican to the Eighteenth Congress to fill the vacancy caused by the resignation of Representative-elect Smith and served from January 4, 1823, to March 3, 1825. After Congress, McKim served as one of the original directors of the Baltimore and Ohio Railroad Co. from 1827 until 1831.

McKim returned to Congress, elected as a Jacksonian to the Twenty-third and Twenty-fourth Congresses and reelected as a Democrat to the Twenty-fifth Congress. He served from March 4, 1833, until his death in Baltimore, Maryland, on April 1, 1838. He was interred in the burying ground of St. Paul's Church.

== Merchant ==
McKim was a "wealthy sea-dog and merchant" and a leader in the commercial and industrial life of Baltimore. He owned a fleet of merchant ships.

Among other businesses he had a copper warehouse on Gay street in Baltimore, and operated a steam flour mill.

== Owner of the Ann McKim ==
In 1832, he contracted the Baltimore-based shipbuilding firm of Kennard & Williamson to build the ship of his dreams, the clipper ship Ann McKim, which he named in honor of his wife. It served to refine the design of many of clippers built over the next 25 years.

== Personal life ==
McKim died on April 1, 1838, in Baltimore. He was buried in Old Saint Paul's Cemetery. There is a cenotaph in his memory at Congressional Cemetery.

== Legacy ==
Isaac McKim finished the building of the first free school in the U.S., McKim Free School, started by his father John McKim.

In 1837, Kennard & Williamson built the 163-ton brig Isaac McKim, that was named after McKim.

== See also ==
- List of members of the United States Congress who died in office (1790–1899)

U.S. House of Representatives
Preceded by Samuel Smith	Member of the U.S. House of Representatives from Maryland's 5th congressional district 1823–1825	Succeeded by John Barney
Preceded by Benjamin Chew Howard and John Tolley Hood Worthington	Member of the U.S. House of Representatives from Maryland's 5th congressional district 1833–1835	Succeeded by George Corbin Washington
Preceded by James P. Heath	Member of the U.S. House of Representatives from Maryland's 4th congressional district 1835–1838	Succeeded by John P. Kennedy
