= Robert Waterman (sea captain) =

American sea captain (1808–1884)

Robert H. Waterman
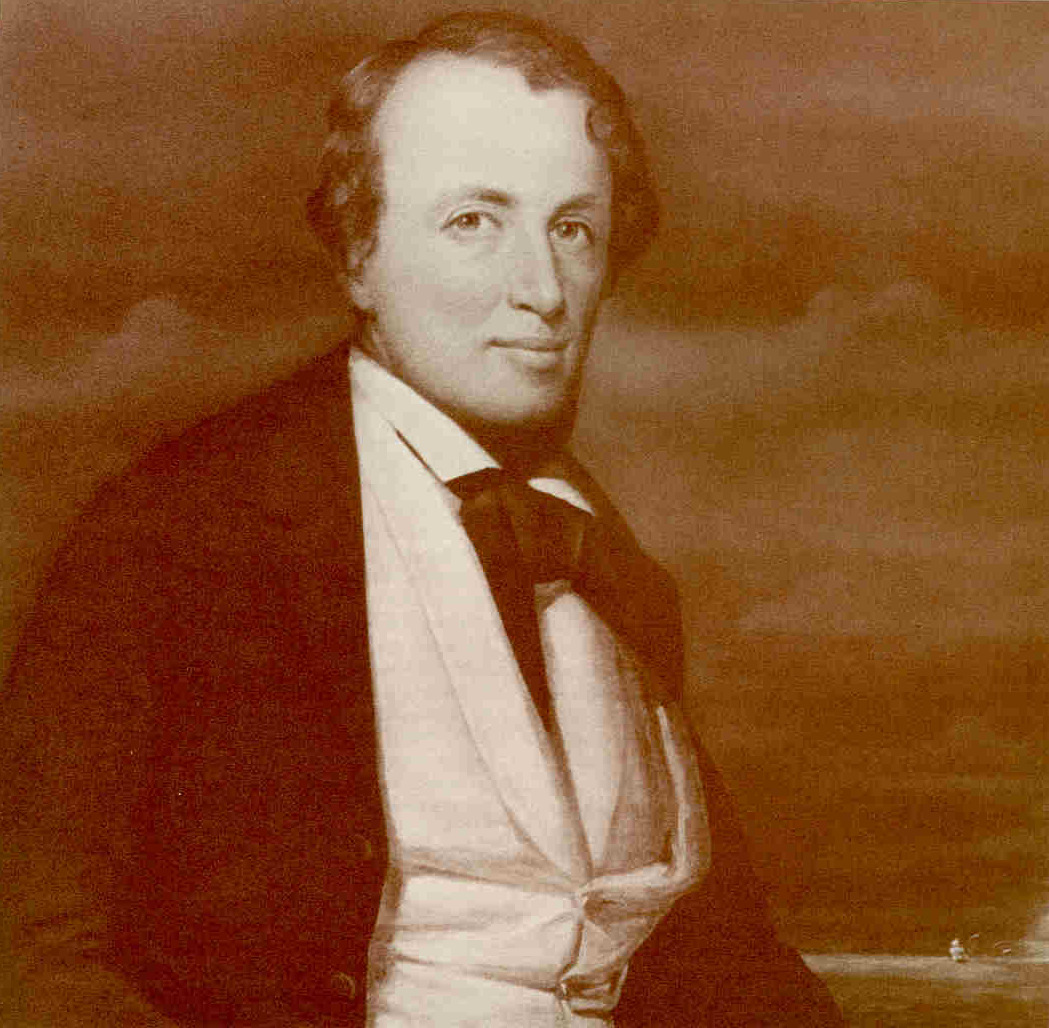
- Captain Robert H. Waterman
- Born: March 4, 1808; Hudson, New York
- Died: August 8, 1884 (aged 76); Near Fairfield, California
- Other names: Bully Waterman; Bully Bob Waterman
- Occupations: Sea captain Maritime consultant
- Known for: Master of the record breaking run of the Sea Witch

Notes
- Helped found the town of Fairfield, California

Robert H. Waterman (March 4, 1808 – August 8, 1884), known as Bully Waterman or Bully Bob Waterman, was an American merchant sea captain. He set three sailing speed records; his time of 74 days from Hong Kong to New York City has never been bettered in a sail-powered vessel. He was reputed as a martinet, and was once convicted of assault against a crewman in a controversial California criminal case.

== Early career ==
Waterman was born in Hudson, New York, the son of a Nantucket whaling captain. His father died at sea when the boy was eight, and the family moved to Fairfield, Connecticut. Waterman first went to sea at age 12 aboard a China trader, and spent most of the next nine years aboard transatlantic packet ships. By 1829, at the age of 21, he had been promoted to first mate of the Black Ball packet Britannia. His captain aboard the Britannia, Charles H. Marshall, later bought the packet South America and made Waterman the skipper. It was Waterman's first command.

In 1836, Waterman accepted command of the cotton freighter Natchez, owned by Howland & Aspinwall, a Manhattan merchant company. He guided the Natchez on several voyages around Cape Horn to Valparaíso. In 1842, Howland & Aspinwall switched the Natchez to the China trade, and Waterman sailed her to Macao. His return trip from Macao to New York took only 78 days, a new record.

== Captain of the Sea Witch ==
During the late 1840s, Howland & Aspinwall gave Waterman command of the clipper Sea Witch. Waterman worked with the ship's designer, John W. Griffiths, designing much of the Sea Witch's rig and sail plan, specifying 140-foot-tall (43 m) masts and more square footage of sail than a 74-gun warship. In 1847, he brought the Sea Witch from Hong Kong to New York in 77 days, beating his previous record by a day.

In 1849, Waterman set his final record for the Hong Kong–New York trip. Leaving New York on April 27, 1848, he went to China by the unusual route of Cape Horn (most China clippers traveled by way of the Cape of Good Hope). Loading a cargo of tea at Hong Kong, Waterman took the Sea Witch out of harbor on January 9, 1849. Spending much of the voyage under full sail, he started the Sea Witch's return voyage via the Sunda Strait, often covering over 200 miles (320 km) per day and once reaching 300 miles (480 km). He reached the Cape of Good Hope February 16, logging a 308-mile (496 km) run for the day, his best of the voyage. Waterman reached New York on March 25, a 74-day passage. Neither he nor any other captain of a sail-powered vessel would ever break this record.

== Voyage of the Challenge ==
Handsomely rewarded by Howland & Aspinwall for his unequaled performance aboard the Sea Witch, Waterman briefly retired from seafaring. However, the N. L. & G. Griswold shipping company was seeking a high-quality captain for its new clipper Challenge, offering him a $10,000 bonus if he could get the ship to San Francisco within 90 days of departure. Waterman accepted the Challenge, and took her out of New York on July 13, 1851. That very first day, Waterman quarreled with and dismissed his first mate, and replaced him with James Douglass, hired off the deck of a packet at Sandy Hook.

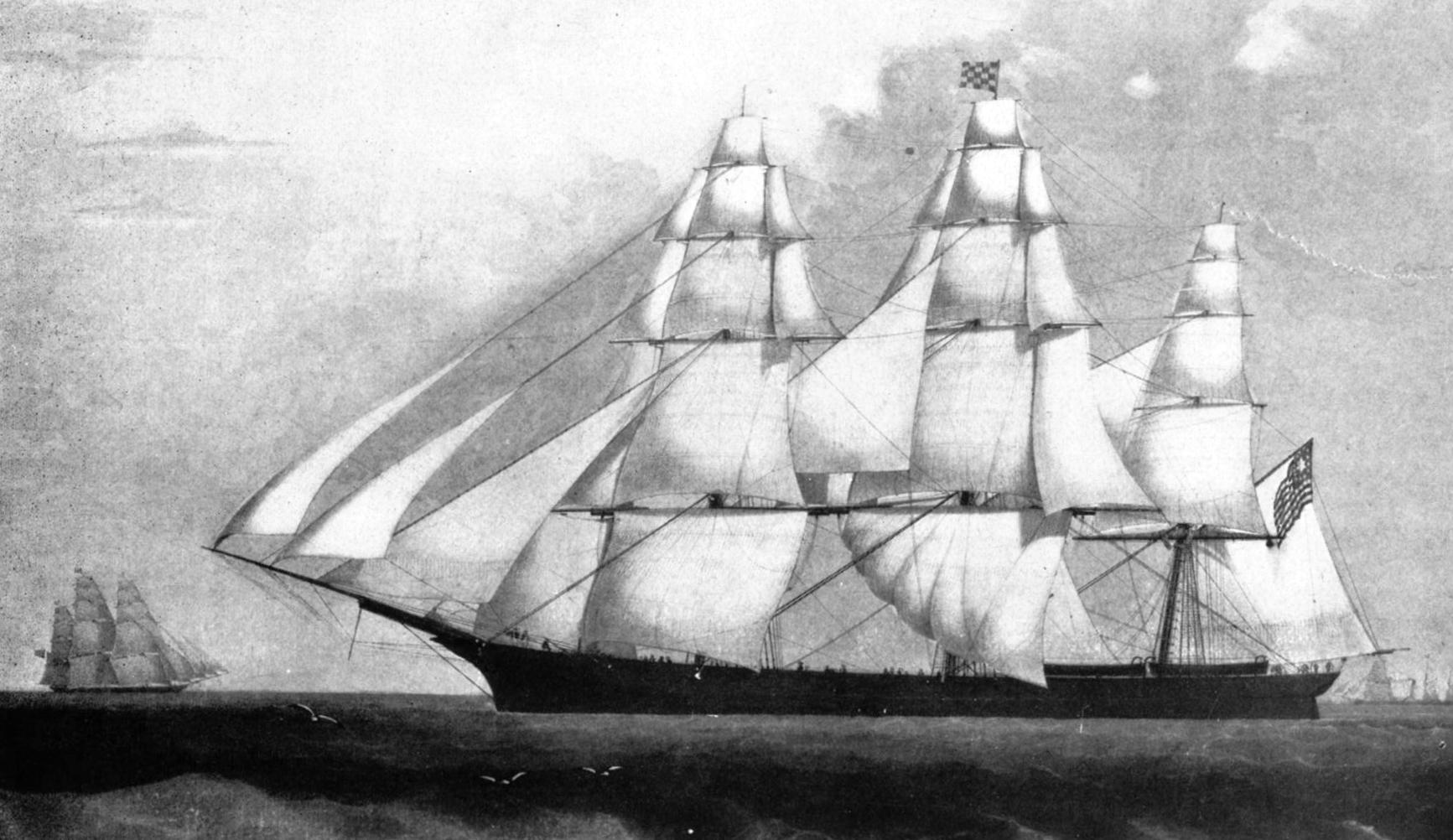
Challenge, 1851 clipper

Unfortunately for all concerned, N. L. & G. Griswold had failed to provide Challenge with an experienced crew; the huge demand for sailors occasioned by clippers sailing for the California gold fields had left few competent seamen in New York. Half of the ship's 56-man complement had never sailed, and only three were able seamen; many were recent immigrants who could speak no English. Discipline, morale, and seamanship were predictably poor.

Waterman used considerable violence against this crew, personally slashing the cook's scalp with a carving knife, and beating at least two sick sailors for working too slowly. However, the focus of the crew's resentment was the new first mate Douglass, who dealt blows abundantly and with relish. As the Challenge neared Rio de Janeiro, several crewmen conspired to kill Douglass, inflicting 12 knife wounds on him. Waterman waded into the fray and saved Douglass, then personally flogged the mutineers. The U.S. Congress had outlawed flogging aboard merchant vessels in 1850, but the prohibition was routinely violated, especially aboard the hard-driven clipper ships. After rounding Cape Horn, Waterman discovered another of the mutineers who had been hiding in the forecastle, had him dragged on deck, and broke his arm with a club, then had him shackled in the sick bay by the fractured limb.

Most of the violence that Waterman personally inflicted was directed at the mutineers who had tried to kill Douglass. However, Douglass himself continued to abuse the crew intensely, with Waterman doing little to restrain him and occasionally encouraging him.

When the Challenge reached San Francisco after a 108-day passage, the crew's version of events aboard created an uproar in the city. One newspaper called for Waterman to be "burned alive," and he narrowly escaped lynching.

Waterman defiantly had eight of the alleged mutineers arrested, but only one was tried, and that one was acquitted.

Waterman and Douglass themselves stood trial for their conduct aboard the Challenge. Waterman was convicted by a jury for beating one of the sick crewmen, but the judge, Ogden Hoffman, Jr., refused to sentence him. Douglass was convicted of murder for beating a crewman to death, and for assault on another crewman, but no sentence is recorded, and he is known to have been released soon afterward, never again to serve aboard a merchantman.

"The Challenge cases ... were the first 'hellship' trials, and by the very fact that they did occur, they made possible, many years later, the freedom of the American merchant sailor from the tyranny of masters and mates," paving the way for the Seamen's Act of 1915.

"Seagoing-labor litigation and cases relating to the defense of seamen's rights were heard by district courts with coastal jurisdiction, such as those in San Francisco and Honolulu ... the first 21 criminal cases [of the U.S. District Court for the Northern District of California] were connected with the murder or mistreatment of seamen by Captain "Bully" Waterman and other officers of the clipper ship Challenge."

== Retirement ==
Waterman retired from the sea after leaving the Challenge and settled in California with his wife. There he founded the city of Fairfield in 1856, named after his former home in Connecticut. He raised poultry and cattle, and served as San Francisco's Port Warden and Inspector of Hulls. He died in 1884.

== See also ==
- Carrier Pigeon, salvage operation by Capt. Waterman on an 1853 clipper ship wreck

== Bibliography ==
- Addison Beecher Colvin Whipple (1980). The Clipper Ships (July 16, 1981 ed.). Time Life UK. ISBN 0-7054-0631-8. - Total pages: 176
- Dillon, Richard H. (1956). Bully Waterman & the voyage of the clipper Challenge, New York to San Francisco, 1851. Roxburghe Club.
