= Charles J. A. Wilson =

20th-century American artist

- Born: 1880; Glasgow, Scotland
- Died: 1965 (aged 84–85); Newtonville, Massachusetts
- Known for: Marine art

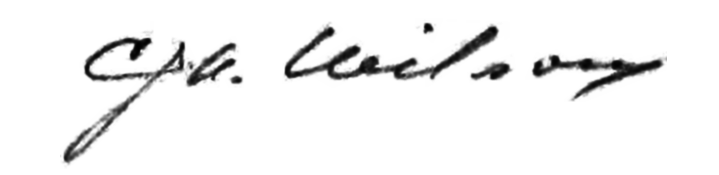
CJA Wilson signature

Charles J. A. Wilson (1880–1965) was an artist, painter, etcher, and illustrator of Scottish origin who gained recognition in the United States. He was particularly renowned for his skill in creating ship portraits and marine art.

Wilson's artistic focus centered on capturing the essence of ships and maritime scenes. His expertise allowed him to craft intricate and detailed ship portraits, showcasing the beauty and grandeur of various vessels. His mastery extended beyond painting, as he also excelled in etching and illustrating.

With a distinctive style and a focus on maritime subjects, Charles J. A. Wilson made lasting contributions to ship portraits and marine art, which continue to be recognized and appreciated today.

== Early life and art career ==
Wilson was born in Glasgow, Scotland in 1880. At age one his family immigrated to Duluth, Minnesota. In his teens he moved to Newton, Massachusetts and taught himself marine art, capturing the ships and scenes of Boston harbor. He worked for Bethlehem Shipbuilding Co. of East Boston etching ships from blueprints.

During the World War I, Wilson spent two years in France. After the war he was commissioned to paint and etch American ships and marine views. During the World War II, Wilson was an official U.S. Coast Guard artist.

Wilson exhibited with the Pennsylvania Academy of Fine Art in 1929, the Philadelphia Museum of Art, the Currier Gallery in 1932, the Lyman Allyn Museum in 1934, as well as the U.S. Coast Guard Academy in New London and the Library of Congress in Washington D.C.

Wilson's painting of the SS Leviathan is in the collection of the Peabody Essex Museum.

Wilson signed his works as C.J.A. Wilson.

== See also ==
- Marine art
