= John W. Griffiths =

American naval architect

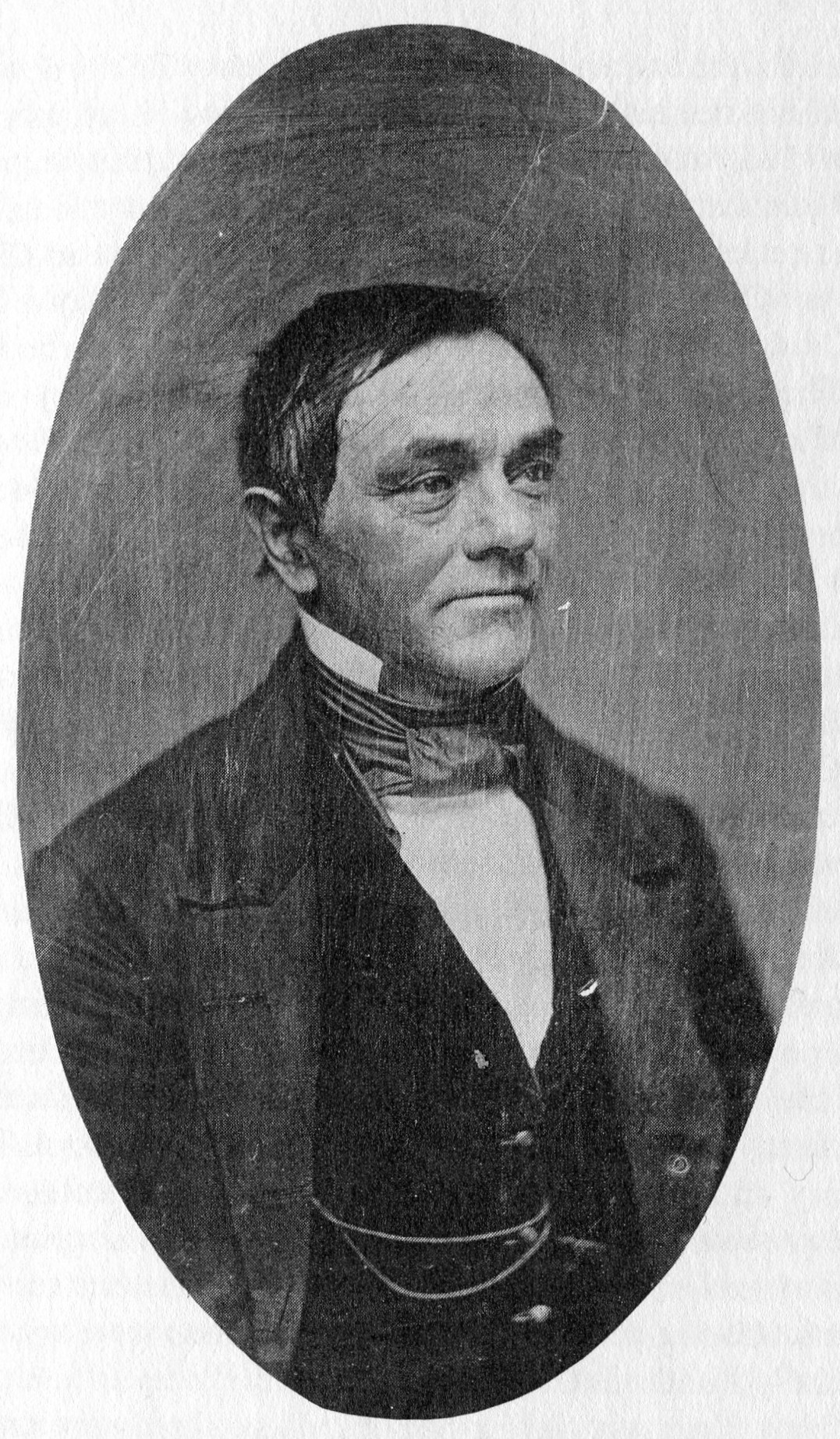
- John W. Griffiths
- Born: October 6, 1809
- Died: March 30, 1882 (aged 72); Brooklyn, New York
- Occupation: Naval architect
- Known for: Designer of Rainbow, the first true clipper ship

John Willis Griffiths (October 6, 1809 – March 30, 1882) was an American naval architect who was influential in his design of clipper ships and his books on ship design and construction. He also designed steamships and war vessels and patented many inventions. Maritime historian William H. Thiesen wrote, "Of all the nineteenth-century American shipbuilders, John W. Griffiths did more than any other builder to champion American shipbuilding methods. An experimenter, an advocate for formal ship-design education, and a working intellectual, Griffiths proved to be most remarkable of America’s nineteenth-century shipbuilders.”

== Ship designer ==
In 1845 Griffiths was employed for the shipbuilding firm of Smith & Dimon in lower Manhattan and designed the clipper ship Rainbow. Historian Dr. Larrie Ferreiro considered the Rainbow “the first of a line of ‘extreme’ clippers, with a fine, raked bow, high deadrise, and hollow waterlines.” The ship was known for fast passages but reportedly went “missing with all hands” in 1848.

Griffiths’ second clipper ship, Sea Witch, was referred to by Smithsonian curator Howard Irving Chapelle as his “masterpiece.” It was launched on December 8, 1846, and “described as the most beautiful ship of her time.” Maritime historian Melbourne Smith wrote in 1980, “Ships of twice her tonnage were built specifically to beat her but her passages home from China have not been equalled under sail to this day.” In 1847 Griffiths built the clipper, Memnon, for Warren Delano, a prominent merchant in the China trade. His fourth and last clipper, Universe, was built by Smith and Dimon in 1850.

In March 1849 the Sea Witch set a record when it sailed from Hong Kong to New York in 74 days 14 hours. It was noted on October 25, 2013, that no single-hulled sailing vessel ever broke the record. Griffiths wrote in 1855, “It will be entirely proper to add, that the model of the Sea Witch had more influence upon the subsequent configuration of fast vessels, than any other ship ever built in the United States.” The Sea Witch was wrecked on the coast of Cuba in 1856 while carrying 500 Chinese workers.

Griffiths had received considerable praise for his clipper designs. Smith & Dimon stated, “We have no hesitation recommending him as a ‘Marine and Naval Architect’ of the first order. A gentleman who has reached an eminence in the line of his profession rarely attained, and whose skills in this branch of Mechanism we believe to be unsurpassed.” Fellow ship designer Donald McKay wrote Griffiths, “You are a master of your profession, have no Superior in it – a Scientific and practical Ship Builder – & an illustrious Citizen . . .”

After Griffiths left Smith & Dimon, his interest shifted from sailing vessels to steamships. He designed the sloop-of-war Pawnee for the US Navy and the radical shallow-draft merchant steamer Ocean Bird. Griffiths presented a model of one of his steamships to Tsar Nicholas I of Russia and, as a token of satisfaction, the tsar presented him with a diamond ring. Earlier in his career, Griffiths had cut frames for the Russian steam frigate Kamchatka.

== Writer and editor ==
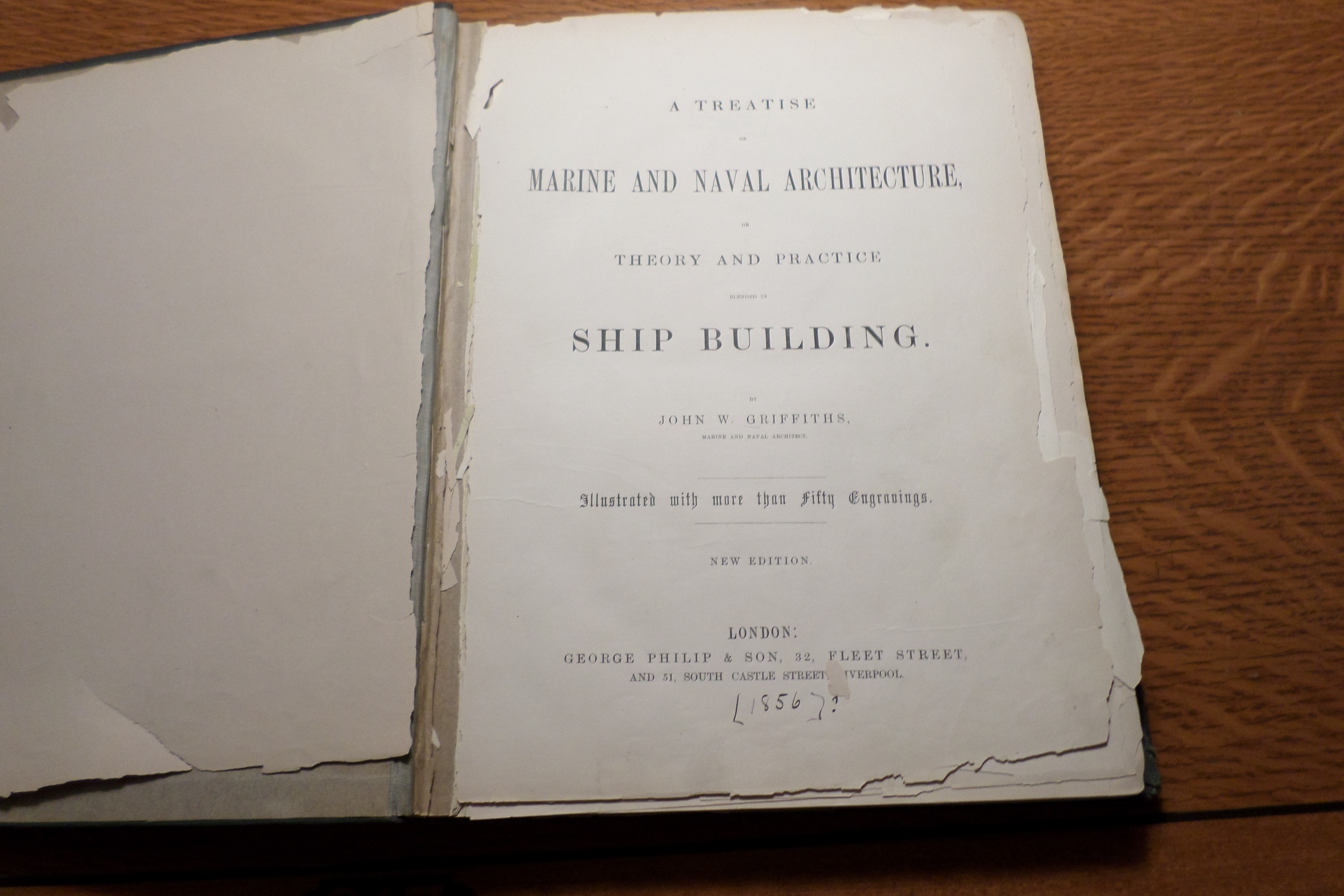
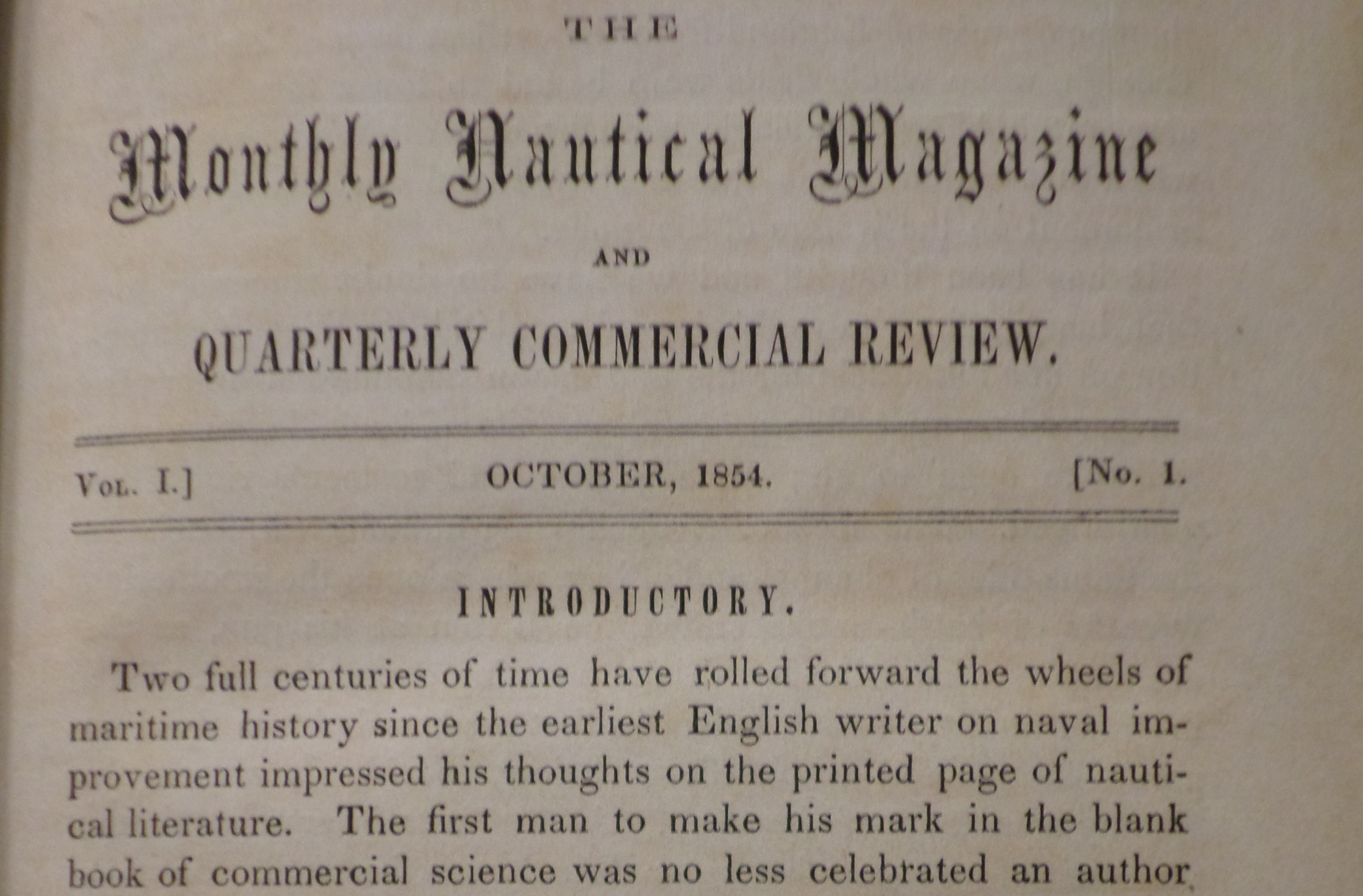
Griffith's Treatise (left), and first issue of Monthly Nautical Magazine (right).

In 1850 Griffiths began his career as an author and editor. His first book, Treatise on Marine and Naval Architecture, was initially published in twelve monthly installments, from January to December 1850. Dr. Larrie Ferreiro wrote, "It was the first American book to extensively treat both the practical and theoretical aspects of ship design and construction . . . " The book was successful and received good reviews in popular magazines such as Scientific American. Griffiths wrote two other books, The Shipbuilder’s Manual and Nautical Referee (1853) and The Progressive Ship Builder(1875).

Griffiths went into partnership with shipbuilder William Wallace Bates to publish a monthly magazine, The Monthly Nautical Magazine and Quarterly Review. Their first issue was published in October 1854 with the stated goal of “cultivating marine architecture in the United States.” One year later it was renamed The US Nautical Magazine and Naval Journal. Griffiths wrote numerous essays on maritime topics, including why wood was preferable to iron as a shipbuilding material. Wrote Dr. Ferreiro, “Griffiths was also a popularizer of new developments in hull design and resistance calculations . . . “ The magazine kept shipbuilders informed about the latest developments in the industry. Griffiths believed that “the press [is] the only legitimate means by which nautical mechanism may be raised from its low position as a compound of crude notions, to the altitude of a science.” Griffiths’ son Oliver took over as editor in 1856. The magazine published its last issue in March 1858 and folded a short time later.

In 1861 a Dutch shipbuilding handbook was published based on Griffiths’ designs and writings. Chapelle wrote, “Strongly opinionated, and contentious, he [Griffiths] was nevertheless an important contributor to the development of American naval architecture.” Melbourne Smith wrote, “John Willis Griffiths was considered a genius as a naval architect, although perhaps somewhat eccentric in his zeal to improve American naval architecture.”

== Later years and legacy ==
In July 1858 the Navy appointed Griffiths as temporary naval constructor at the Philadelphia naval shipyard. In October 1862 Secretary of the Navy Gideon Welles appointed Griffiths as superintendent of gun boats under Samuel Moore Pook. It is unclear how long Griffiths remained a naval constructor during and after the American Civil War.

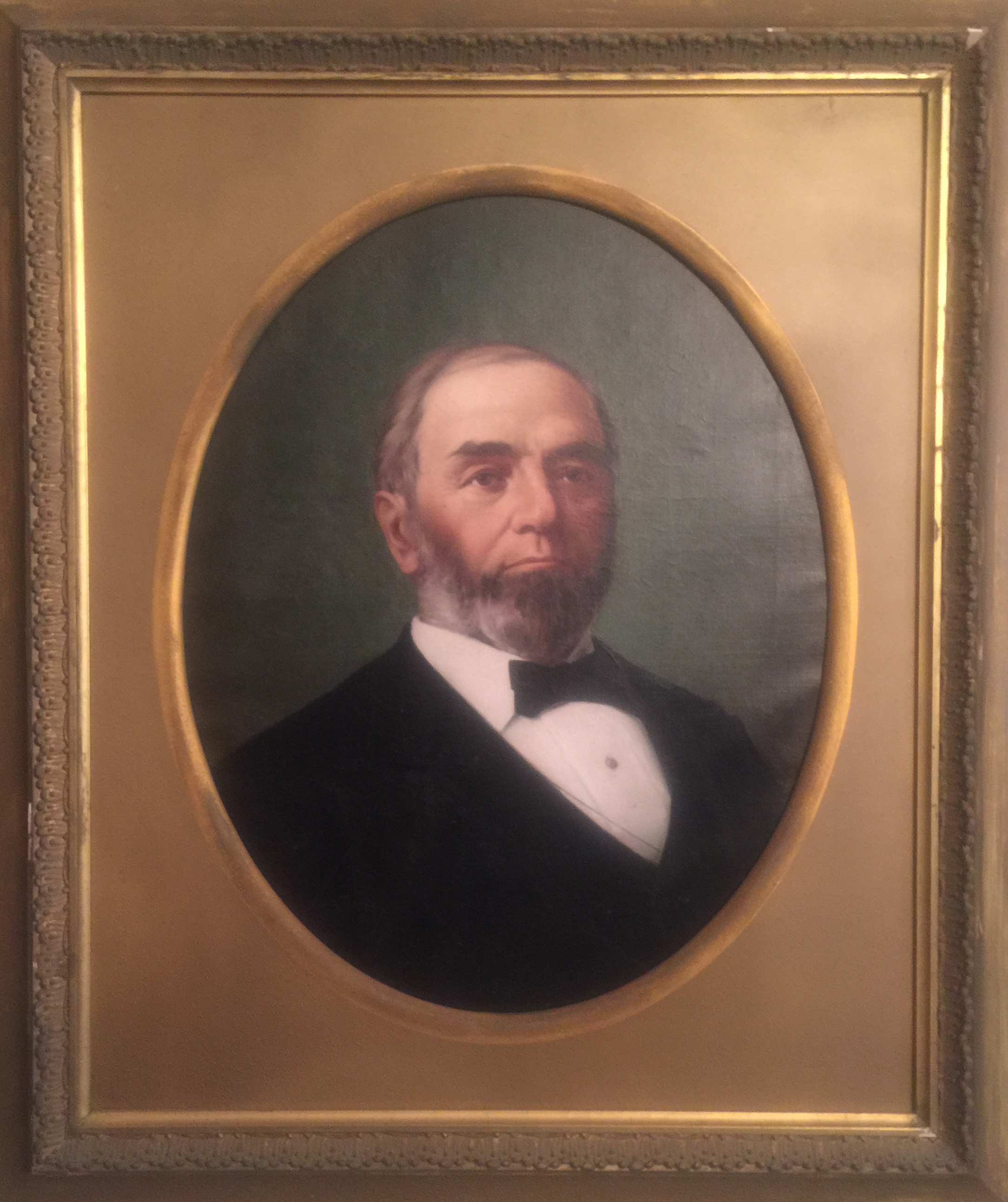
Oil portrait of Griffiths

In his later years Griffiths struggled financially, and his ship designs were not considered as successful. Griffiths’ career was devoted to building wooden ships, but they became obsolete with the advent of iron. He co-owned the Union Ship-Timber Manufacturing Company with his son Oliver and patented a wood-bending machine in 1866. Thiesen wrote, “the timber-bending machine never became popular…because wooden-ship construction had become less profitable by the time Griffiths perfected the machine, and the cost of the apparatus proved too high for most wood shipbuilders.” In 1875 Griffiths created and patented the Universal Wood-Bending Machine for boats, carriages, and other vehicles. He earned a prize at the Philadelphia Centennial Exhibition in 1876 although carriage-maker Samuel R. Bailey always claimed that Griffiths had copied his invention.

Griffiths died of anthrax in Brooklyn, New York, on March 30, 1882, and was interred at the Linden Hill United Methodist Cemetery in Queens, New York. Historian William Brown Meloney dedicated his 1916 book The Heritage of Tyre “to the memory of John Willis Griffiths, whose genius revolutionized the science of merchant shipbuilding and naval architecture and enthroned the United States as Mistress of the Seas.” Marion H. Virnelson, Griffiths’ granddaughter, donated his belongings to the Smithsonian Institution in 1937. Griffiths' obituary did not appear in any major New York City newspapers, and his grave in Queens had been unmarked for 134 years. A headstone was unveiled on July 23, 2016, under the sponsorship of the National Maritime Historical Society. Meloney had written back in 1916, "Ocean conqueror by sail and by steam, he sleeps as he died, unhonored and unsung --- forgotten by a heedless people . . . "

During World War II the Liberty ship SS John W. Griffiths was built in Panama City, Florida, and named in his honor.

== Notes ==
Many sources erroneously state that John Willis Griffiths died on April 29, 1882. However, his death certificate indicates that he died on March 30, 1882; the certificate (#3832) was issued by the Department of Health of the City of Brooklyn. Cemetery records from Linden Hill United Methodist Cemetery in Queens, New York, also indicate that Griffiths died before the month of April. Both the death certificate and the cemetery records are cited by Dr. Larrie Ferreiro in his article, "A Biographical Sketch of John Willis Griffiths from Primary and Biographical Sources".

The Sea Witch set a record by sailing from Hong Kong to New York in 74 days 14 hours. As of October 25, 2013, the record has yet to be broken by any single-hulled sailing vessel. In May 2003, the trimaran (multi-hulled vessel) Great American II sailed from Hong Kong to Sandy Hook in fewer than 73 days.
