= Sea Witch (clipper) =

American sailing cargo ship

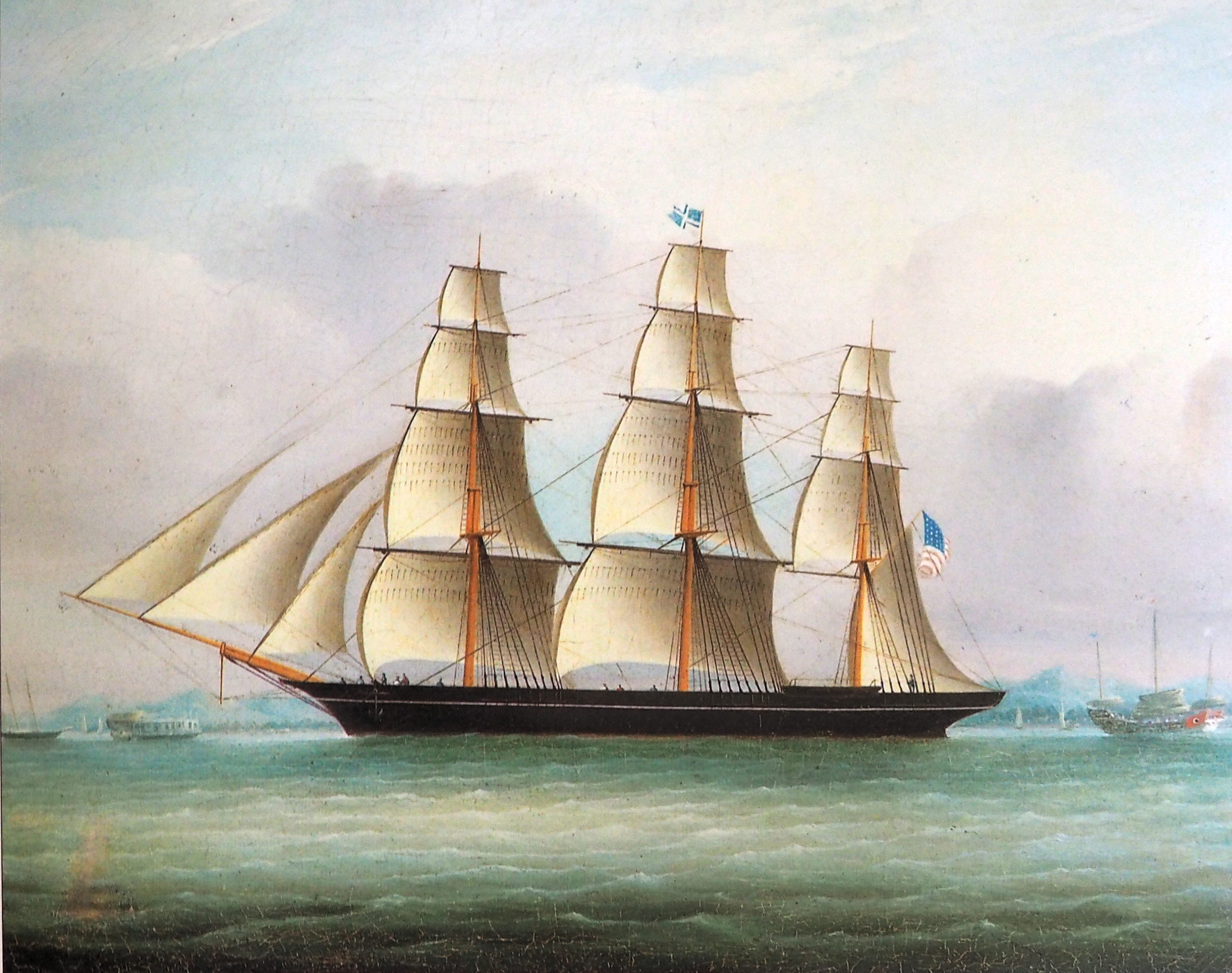
- Sea Witch depicted by a Chinese artist, coming to anchor in Whampoa

History

United States
- Name: Sea Witch
- Owner: Howland & Aspinwall, New York
- Builder: Smith & Dimon, New York
- Launched: Dec. 8, 1846
- Fate: Wrecked on a reef 12 miles off Havana, 1856

General characteristics
- Class & type: Extreme clipper
- Tons burthen: 908 (bm)
- Length: 170 ft 3 in (51.9 m)
- Beam: 33 ft 11 in (10.3 m)
- Draft: 19 ft 0 in (5.8 m)

Sea Witch was an American clipper ship designed by naval architect John W. Griffiths for the China trading firm of Howland & Aspinwall. She was launched at Smith & Dimon in Manhattan on December 8, 1846.

== Model for American clipper ship design ==
"In 1845, John Willis Griffiths built the fast ship Rainbow and followed it in the next year with the even faster Sea Witch. Both vessels would have tremendous impact on merchant hull design. Sea Witch, in fact, had more influence on the configuration of fast vessels than any other ship built in the United States. Vessels built in general accordance with the Sea Witch model were known as clippers, a term already well entrenched in the language of fast vessels."

== Construction ==
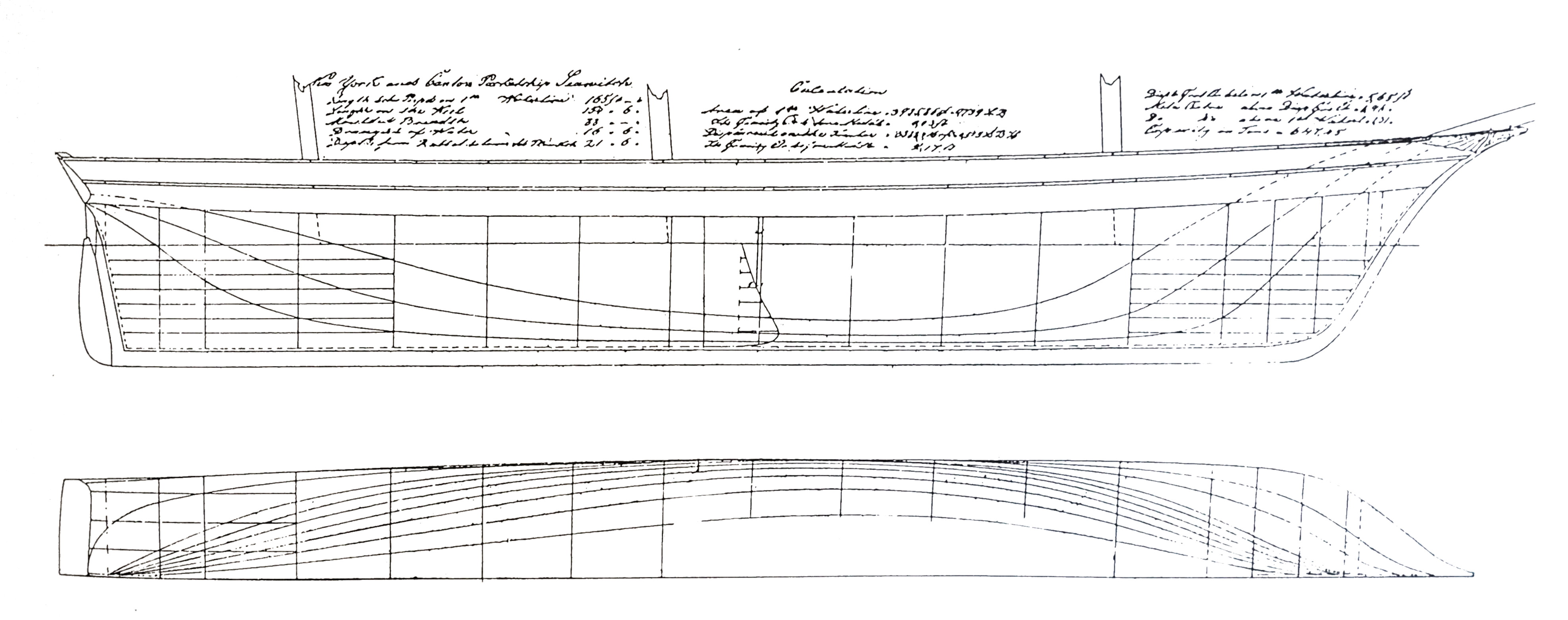
Plan and elevation of Sea Witch

Sea Witch was 192 feet in length, had a 43-foot beam, and was of 908 tons burthen. She was designed and built by the shipbuilding firm of Smith & Dimon in New York City as a purpose-built vessel for the speedy movement of high-value freight, such as porcelain and tea, from China to the United States East Coast. To this end, she was very heavily sparred and built with especially tall masts for a vessel of her size. Her 140-foot mainmast carried five tiers of sails, as did the shorter foremast and mizzenmast. She was briefly the tallest ship afloat, and is credited with being one of the first American "clipper ships."

== Figurehead ==
"The figurehead was a Chinese dragon with an open mouth and a partly coiled tail. The hull was painted black with a contrasting sheerline strip at deck level and the spars were all bright work."

== Hong-Kong to New York record holder, 1849–2003 ==
Howland & Aspinwall gave the command of Sea Witch to Captain Robert Waterman, known in the trade as "Bully Bob" Waterman. In 1847, under Waterman, she made a record-setting run from Hong Kong to New York in 77 days. She lowered this record to 74 days under the same captain in 1849. This March 1849 mark is one of the longest-lived human speed records, bettered only in May 2003 by the trimaran Great American II in 72 days 21 hours 11 minutes 38 seconds. Rich du Moulin, one of the sailors on the Great American II, noted that Sea Witch had faced greater obstacles. He said that the Sea Witch did not have the advantage of modern technology or weather forecasts from outside sources. Du Moulin wrote, “The power of the Sea Witch in heavy seas and strong winds is still awesome, and it was carrying cargo! For me it was essential to have the Sea Witch as a competitor. Without the competitive element, I am not sure I could have handled this long voyage.” As of October 25, 2013, Sea Witch continues to hold the Hong Kong-New York record for a monohulled sailing vessel.

== Voyages ==
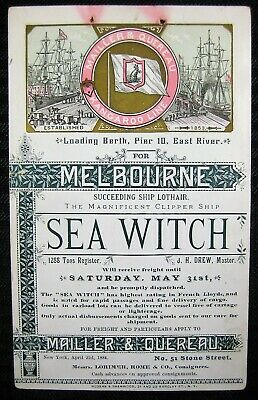
Clipper ship sailing card

After gold was discovered in California, Sea Witch's owners, Howland & Aspinwall, transferred her from the China trade to the new Cape Horn run from the East Coast to San Francisco. In early 1850, Sea Witch completed this passage in 97 days, the first vessel ever to do so in less than 100 days.

Later in the 1850s, Sea Witch physically deteriorated and her place in the fast-freight trade was taken over by newer vessels. The aging clipper ship was reassigned to serve as a steerage vessel carrying immigrants to the Western Hemisphere. In 1856, with approximately 500 immigrants from China on board, she ran aground 12 miles (19 km) west of Havana.

== Painting and models ==
- Clipper Ship SEA WITCH Coming to Anchor At Whampoa - Oil painting by unidentified Chinese artist, Peabody Museum
- Model, Sea Witch, Tea Clipper
- Model, Sea Witch Clipper Ship
