= James Henry Martin =

British shipowner and entrepreneur

- Born: 1835; Middlesex, United Kingdom
- Died: 21 November 1909 (aged 73–74); Hastings, United Kingdom
- Occupations: Shipowner and Entrepreneur
- Known for: Co-founded Killick Martin & Company
- Spouse: Louisa Barber Smith (m. 1871; died 1894)
- Children: 3

James Henry Martin (1835 – 21 November 1909) was a British shipowner and entrepreneur. He founded Killick Martin & Company with James Killick. During the 1870s and 1880s, he was Joint Principle Surveyor of Lloyds Register.

== Early life ==
James Henry Martin was born in Middlesex in 1835. His father James Martin was born in Gillingham, Kent in 1799.

== Career ==
Prior to 1861, James Henry Martin worked for Phillips, Shaw & Lowther, owners of the clipper ships like Ariel and Titania. During his period with the partnership, James Henry Martin concentrated on the running of the office and securing of cargo. In 1885, he changed its name to Shaw, Lowther and Maxton, when Peter Maxton, former captain, joined the partnership. Incidentally, Maxton was friends with Captain James Killick and captained two ships, 'The Lord of the Isles' and 'Falcon' the same time Captain Killick was master of ‘Challenger’ in the tea trade from China.

=== Killick Martin & Company ===
On 1 March 1861, James Henry Martin along with Captain James Killick founded the partnership Killick Martin & Company. The original 'Notice of Opening a Partnership' stated that it commenced business as ‘Ship and Insurance Brokers’. The company went on to be known as Killick Martin & Company from 2 March 1862 when David William Richie became a partner. David William Ritchie's father was the Joint Principle Surveyor, Joseph Horatio Ritchie alongside James Martin. The two partners in Killick Martin & Company originally would have become acquainted via their fathers.

Killick Martin & Company went on to own and operate twenty ships between 1862 and 1879. These included the likes of Challenger, Wylo, Lothair and Kaisow.

The company has constantly evolved and continues to trade to this day.

== Personal life and death ==
James Henry Martin married Louisa Barber Smith on 10 June 1871 in St. Mary's Church Lewisham and went on to have three children: James Henry Martin (born 1874), Alfred Scott Martin (born 1876) and Louisa M Martin (born 1884).

James Henry Martin retired from the business during the mid-1880s due to a psychotic breakdown; Walter Johnson had the task of taking him to a mental home in Scotland.

Whilst the extent of James Henry Martin's illness is unknown, he is listed in the 1891 English census living with his children in Lewisham, London. His wife died on 5 June 1894.

James Henry Martin died on 21 November 1909 in Hastings, Sussex.

== Legacy ==
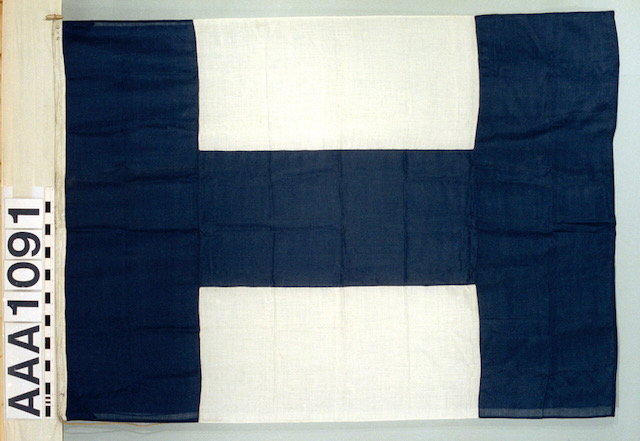
House flag of Killick Martin & Company

Killick Martin's House Flag is held within the National Maritime Museum, and a Builder's model of Lothair in the Hong Kong Museum of History.
