= Osaka (barque) =

English composite barque

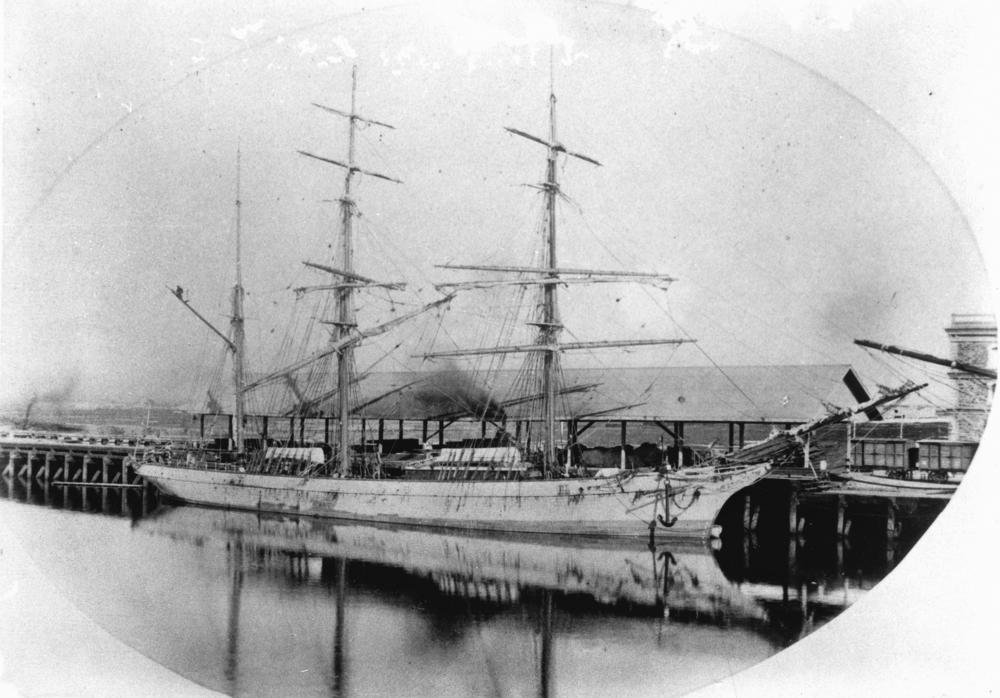
- A picture of Osaka

History

United Kingdom
- Name: Osaka
- Owner: Killick Martin & Company, London
- Builder: William pile, Sunderland
- Launched: 12 July 1869

United Kingdom
- Owner: Thomas Roberts and Sons, Llanelly, Carmarthenshire
- Acquired: 30 March 1885

United Kingdom
- Owner: Möller & Co, Shanghai
- Acquired: 1895
- Fate: Wrecked 14 September 1904

General characteristics
- Class & type: Composite barque
- Tonnage: 546 GRT
- Length: 165 ft (50.3 m)
- Beam: 30.2 ft (9.2 m)
- Depth: 17.3 ft (5.3 m)

Osaka, A composite barque, built by William Pile, Sunderland, at Yard No. 179 for Killick Martin & Company, the company founded by Captain James Killick and launched on 12 July 1869. William Pile also built Osaka's sister ship Miako, for Killick Martin & Company launched on 15 April 1869.

William Pile also built City of Adelaide the world's oldest surviving clipper ship, of only two that survive — the other being the Cutty Sark.

Osaka's dimensions were 50.33×9.21×5.28 meters [165'0"×30'2"×17'3"] and 546 GRT, 527 NRT.

Under Killick Martin & Company's ownership Osaka had three captains. The first was Captain John Lawrence Leslie from 1869 to 1872, then Captain William Anderson Davidson between 1872 and 1873, and finally Captain Robert Lowe from 1873 to 1885. Captain Robert Lowe's son James Lowe was also a sea captain for Killick Martin & Company commanding Agnes Muir, clipper between 1875 and 1885.

Osaka's maiden voyage was to Tasmania, Yokohama, Hong Kong, Saigon, Kobe, Bangkok, Hong Kong, New York, then back to London.

Throughout her life she continued to make varied passages visiting a range of ports from those listed above, to Adelaide, Guam, Anjur, Manila, Cape Town, Port Elizabeth, Sydney, St. Helena, Calcutta, Rangoon, Canton, Whampoa, Osaka, and Queenstown carrying cargoes of coal, rice, sugar, coconut oil, coffee, and hemp.

Osaka was sold on 30 March 1885 to Thomas Roberts, Llanelly, Carmarthenshire, and then in 1895 to N.E. Moller & Sons, then Moller Bros, Shanghai.

She was wrecked on 14 September 1904 on Kuril Islands on a voyage from Tsingtao to Nicolaieosk with general cargo.
