= Maju =

Maju or MAJU may refer to:

== Education ==
- Mohammad Ali Jinnah University, Pakistan
- Maju Institute of Education Development, an organisation under the Malaysian Indian Congress

== Transport ==
- Maju (iron ship), a full-rigged ship built in 1874
- Maju railway station, West Bengal, India
- Maju MRT station, a planned station in Singapore
- Maju Expressway, Malaysia

== Other ==
- Sugaar or Maju, a pre-Christian Basque deity associated with storms and thunder
- Maju group, one of the factions in the 1987 Ming Court Affair in Sarawak, Malaysia

== People with the given name ==
- Maju Herklotz (born 1975), Brazilian fencer
- Maju Ozawa (born 1977), Japanese actress who portrayed Risa Fukami in Kamen Rider Agito
- Maria Júlia Coutinho (born 1978), Brazilian television presenter
- Maju Varghese (born 1978), American attorney and political advisor
- María Julia Mantilla (born 1984), Peruvian actress
- Maju Trindade (born 1998), Brazilian actress
- Maju Arai (born 1998), Japanese singer, former member of Little Glee Monster

== See also ==
- Majus, an Arabic term originally referring to Zoroastrian priests
- Wangsa Maju (disambiguation)
