= Wylo (clipper) =

Scottish composite clipper

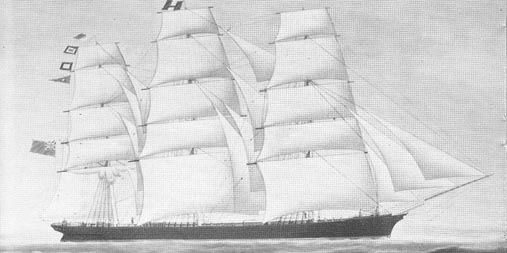
- A picture of Wylo

History

United Kingdom
- Name: Wylo
- Owner: Killick Martin & Company
- Builder: Robert Steele & Company, Greenock
- Launched: 15 April 1869

United Kingdom
- Owner: William Ross, London
- Acquired: 1886

Canada
- Owner: James Ross, Quebec
- Cost: £2375
- Acquired: 1886
- Fate: Beached 1886

General characteristics
- Class & type: Composite clipper
- Tonnage: 829 NRT
- Length: 192.9 ft (58.8 m)
- Beam: 32.1 ft (9.8 m)
- Depth: 20.2 ft (6.2 m)

Wylo a composite clipper was built by Robert Steele & Company, Greenock, and launched on 15 April 1869. Robert Steele & Company also built the famous clippers Ariel and Taeping who took part in the great tea race of 1866, and Sir Lancelot another renown clipper ship.

Wylo was the 174th and last vessel to be built by Robert Steele & Company. She was 192.9 ft in length, had a beam of 32.1 ft, a depth of 20.2 feet and measured 829 Gross register tons.

The Figurehead of Wylo still exists in the Fries Scheepvaart Museum in Sneek, the Netherlands. Item number FSM-J-122. A multi-colour painted image of a Moor with skirt and bared upper body. The head of the Moor is adorned with a turban. In the ears earrings. The pedestal is decorated with a spiral and leaf and diamond motifs. A finger has been broken off the right hand. The name Wylo is derived from Chinese, it would mean 'speed'.

== Killick Martin & Company ==
Wylo was built for Killick Martin & Company, led by Captain James Killick. She was a sister ship to Kaisow in the Killick Martin fleet, which was the 173rd vessel, and second from last to be built by Robert Steele & Company. Wylo was one of three ships bought by Killick Martin & Company, who also acquired Mikao & Osaka. Wylo's maiden journey was on 1 June 1869 under Captain Henry Wray Browne, a former Captain of the Killick Martin & Company owned Challenger, where Wylo sailed to Shanghai in 103 days, and returned on 22 October with a cargo of tea in 103 days.

Further Transits made by Wylo (1870–1885) were:

1870: 11 February - 25 May Sailed from London to Fuzhou in 103 days.

1870: 18 August - 11 December Sailed from Fuzhou to London in 115 days.

1871: 10 January - 29 April Sailed from London to Rangoon in 109 days.

1871: 23 May - 31 August Sailed from Rangoon to Falmouth in 99 days.

1871: 12 October - 30 January Sailed from London to Shanghai in 110 days.

1872: 21 September - 15 December Sailed from Indramayoe, Java, to Falmouth in 80 days.

1873: 20 March - 27 June Sailed from Hamburg to Hong Kong in 99 days.

1873: 24 September - 15 February Sailed from Manilla to New York in 144 days.

1876: 14 April - 22 July Sailed from London to Shanghai in 99 days.

1879: 24 February - 16 May Sailed from London to Melbourne in 81 days.

1883: Sailed from San Francisco to Queenstown in 111 days.

1884: Sailed from San Francisco to Barrow in 104 days.

1885: 8 January Left Barrow for Victoria, BC.

In 1878 Wylo was re-rigged as a Barque to reduce manning and operational costs.

On 1 April 1885, on her last voyage for Killick Martin & Company she put into Port Stanley in the Falkland Islands, partially dismasted after having lost her bulwarks, stanchions and mizzen mast off Cape Horn. She was not the only casualty of bad weather at this time as the Windsor Castle from Swansea and the Confluentia from Shields, both bound for Valparaíso also put into Port Stanley damaged. Wylo's repairs took one month before she resumed her passage to Vancouver Island.

== William Ross and James Ross ==
In 1886 she was sold to William Ross, London, who 4 days later sold her to James Ross, Quebec for £2375. Later that year on a voyage from Barbados to Montreal, Wylo was in collision at Quebec with the French steamer Henri IV. Wylo was badly damaged and beached on the Louise Embankment to prevent her sinking, but was later condemned and broken up in situ.

The figure head of Wylo is currently on display in the Fries Scheepvaart Museum the Netherlands.

== Wylo Artwork ==
The maritime artist James Brereton has painted Wylo, and images of her are still being produced today.
