= Moller & Company =

Moller & Co.
- Industry: Shipping

Möller & Co. was a shipping firm founded in Shanghai by Swedish captain Nils Möller in 1882. In 1903, Möller's two sons took over the shipping business, reorganizing it as Moller Bros.

On 30 March 1885 Moller & Co. acquired the composite barque Osaka from Thomas Roberts, Llanelly, Carmarthenshire, a ship built by William Pile originally for Killick Martin & Company.

In 1907, the brothers sold their last sailing ships and purchased their first steam ship. In 1910 the business became a sole proprietorship owned by brother Eric Möller under the name Möller & Co. Routes traveled were mainly the China coast, Eastern Russia, Japan, Philippines and Indonesia.

In 1946 Möller took over management of both Alpha South African SS Co. and the Lancashire Shipping Co.

In 1953 the company abandoned the China coast trade and transferred its operations from Shanghai to Hong Kong. Subsidiary companies included Grosvenor Shipping Co. (London), Red Anchor Line (Hong Kong) and Hong Kong and Redfern Shipping Co. (Bermuda). Shipping operations were discontinued in 1981.
