= Killick Martin & Company =

Transport company

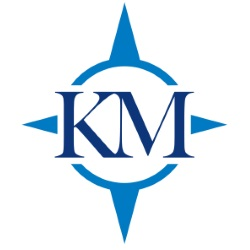
- Type: Private
- Industry: Transportation; Logistics
- Founded: London, United Kingdom, (1861; 165 years ago)
- Founders: James Killick (1816-1889), James Henry Martin (1835-1909)
- Headquarters: Basildon, United Kingdom
- Area served: Worldwide
- Key people: Ashley R Nichols (Chairman), Paul F Gallagher (Managing Director)
- Services: Freight Forwarding; Supply Chain Management; Integrated Service Provider
- Parent: Atlantic Pacific Group Ltd
- Website: http://www.killickmartin.com
- Footnotes House Flag

Killick Martin and Company Ltd is a privately owned global transport and logistics company with its head office in the United Kingdom. The company can trace its origins back to 1861 when it was founded by Captain James Killick and James Henry Martin. The company provides ocean freight, air freight, road freight, customs clearance, warehousing and supply chain management services. The company today has 5 offices in the United Kingdom and a global network of agencies. The ultimate parent company is Atlantic Pacific Group Ltd.

== Services ==
Killick Martin & Company Ltd provides ocean freight, air freight, road freight, customs clearance, warehousing, distribution and supply chain management services, with a focus on providing IT-based Services.

They also provide Integrated Logistics including 4PL Management, Supplier & Inventory Management.

Services extend to the world's largest industries including: fast-moving consumer goods, furniture, industrial goods, homewares, pharmaceuticals, healthcare and foodstuffs (both ambient and temperature controlled).

== History ==
=== Founding ===
Killick Martin and Company was founded in 1861 under the name Killick Martin by Captain James Killick (1816–1889) and James Henry Martin. James Killick was born at the Killick family home, named Whitehall in Cheam, England, in 1816. He first went to sea in 1831, commanding his first ship in 1840. His seafaring background gave him the necessary experience to manage the ship-owning side of the business. James Henry Martin, twenty years younger than Killick, who had previously worked for Phillips, Shaw & Lowther, which later changed its name to Shaw, Lowther and Maxton (owners of famous clipper ships like Ariel and Titania) concentrated on the running of the office and securing of cargo.

In 1863, the company name was changed to Killick Martin & Company when David William Richie became a partner.

On 31 October 1953 the Killick Martin & Company partnership was dissolved and the business acquired by a private limited company formed for that purpose to be known as Killick Martin & Company Ltd. The partners became directors, and Denys Godin became chairman, holding this position until 1970.

=== Shipowners (1862–1886) ===
An important part of Killick Martin & Company's business during its first 25 years was the owning and management of sailing ships. The three partners Killick, Martin & Ritchie constituted themselves as joint owners, although James Killick also held shares in three vessels on his own account: Yang-tsze, Challenger and Miako. The partners only twice held all the shares in owned vessels and these were Gazelle and Heversham. As specialists in managing ships and finding cargo initially all the ship owning partners nominated James Henry Martin, David William Ritchie and James Killick as managing owners, but in 1875 Martin and Ritchie designated James Killick the sole managing owner.

Apart from the three partners, the next principal shareholder was Edward Boustead, who held shares in eleven of Killick Martin & Company's vessels. Boustead was the senior partner in Boustead & Company from 1851 to his death in 1888. Two of Boustead's partners in Boustead & Company, Wardrop Shaw and Jasper Young, also held shares in some of the ships. Jasper Young owned 40 shares in Mabel Young presumably named after his wife or daughter.

Other shareholders had connections with the initial Managing Owners. John Dugdale had been the owner of John Dugdale which James Killick had once commanded and George Fredrick Thomson had been the master of both the Fusi Yama and Obma. He was the only master and shareholder in the Killick Martin fleet.

==== Vessels ====
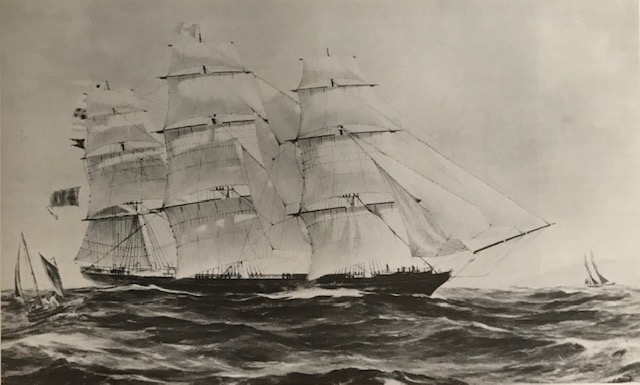
Challenger

During the period May 1862 and July 1886, Killick Martin & Company held shares in twenty vessels. The first vessel owned by the company, Gazelle, was built in 1862. She was primarily a sailing vessel with auxiliary steam power, although registered at Lloyd's as a sailing vessel. Gazelle was sold after only one year in the fleet, and, after that, the company only owned and operated clipper ships. During its ship owning period, Killick Martin & Company were represented in Hong Kong and China by Jardine Matheson.

| Years | Name | Built | NRT | Type |
|---|---|---|---|---|
| 1862–1863 | Gazelle | 1862 | 335 | iron steam ship |
| 1863–1871 | Yang-tsze | 1863 | 688 | composite ship |
| 1864–1866 | Heversham | 1856 | 489 | wooden barque |
| 1865–1868 | Challenger | 1852 | 650 | wooden ship |
| 1865–1870 | Fusi Yama | 1865 | 556 | composite barque |
| 1867–1878 | The Sir Jamsetjee Family | 1863 | 1049 | wooden ship |
| 1868–1881 | Omba | 1868 | 836 | composite ship |
| 1869–1885 | Miako | 1869 | 516 | composite barque |
| 1869–1885 | Osaka | 1869 | 527 | composite barque |
| 1869–1886 | Wylo | 1869 | 799 | composite ship |
| 1872–1872 | Eastern Star | 1866 | 340 | wooden barque |
| 1872–1884 | Elmstone | 1866 | 698 | composite barque |
| 1872–1882 | Hope | 1867 | 454 | iron barque |
| 1873–1885 | John C. Munro | 1862 | 613 | iron ship |
| 1873–1885 | Lothair | 1870 | 794 | composite ship |
| 1874–1885 | Agnes Muir | 1869 | 851 | iron ship |
| 1874–1874 | Maju | 1874 | 918 | iron ship |
| 1875–1885 | Kaisow | 1868 | 795 | composite ship |
| 1875–1886 | Lucia ex Maria Fidelia | 1868 | 640 | composite barque |
| 1877–1879 | Mabel Young | 1877 | 1016 | iron barque |

One vessel listed within the Killick Martin & Company fleet table, 'Eastern Star' is not listed in the shareholders' table as she was only owned between 27 September and 15 October 1872. Eastern Star, would appear to have been a vessel possibly traded on behalf of another party.

==== Shareholders ====
The numbers below represent the number of shares held at the time of registration or soon after. In the case of Gazelle Ritchie had not yet joined the firm.

| | Shareholders | | | | | | | | | | | | | |
| Vessels | Killick Martin & Company | James Killick | Edward Boustead | William Wardrop Shaw | John Dugdale | Jasper Young | Samuel Mackenzie | William Lowther Nicholson | Willam Henderson | George Frederick Thomson | George Francis Dickinson | John Paton Watson | Henry Philip Baylis | Duncan Forbes |
|---|---|---|---|---|---|---|---|---|---|---|---|---|---|---|
| Gazelle | 64 | | | | | | | | | | | | | |
| Yang-tsze | | 8 | | | | | | | | | | | | |
| Heversham | 64 | | | | | | | | | | | | | |
| Fusi Yama | 20 | | | | | | 11 | | | | 8 | 16 | 5 | 4 |
| Challenger | 27 | 16 | | | | | 5 | | | | 11 | 5 | | |
| The Sir Jamsetjee Family | 16 | | 32 | 16 | | | | | | | | | | |
| Omba | 16 | | 16 | 16 | 16 | | | | | | | | | |
| Miako | 32 | | | | | | 8 | | 8 | | 8 | 8 | | |
| Wylo | 16 | | 16 | 16 | 16 | | | | | | | | | |
| Osaka | 40 | | | | | | 8 | | 8 | 8 | | | | |
| Hope | 32 | | 16 | 16 | | | | | | | | | | |
| John C. Munro | 32 | | 32 | | | | | | | | | | | |
| Lothair | 16 | | 16 | 8 | | | 8 | | 8 | 8 | | | | |
| Elmstone | 40 | | | | | | 8 | 8 | 8 | | | | | |
| Agnes Muir | 20 | | 8 | 8 | | | 8 | 8 | 8 | 4 | | | | |
| Maju | 40 | | 16 | | | | | 8 | | | | | | |
| Lucia | 24 | | 16 | 16 | | | | 8 | | | | | | |
| Kaisow | 16 | | 16 | 12 | | 12 | | 8 | | | | | | |
| Mabel Young | 8 | | 8 | 8 | | 40 | | | | | | | | |

==== Notable captains ====
James Killick - Captain of Challenger

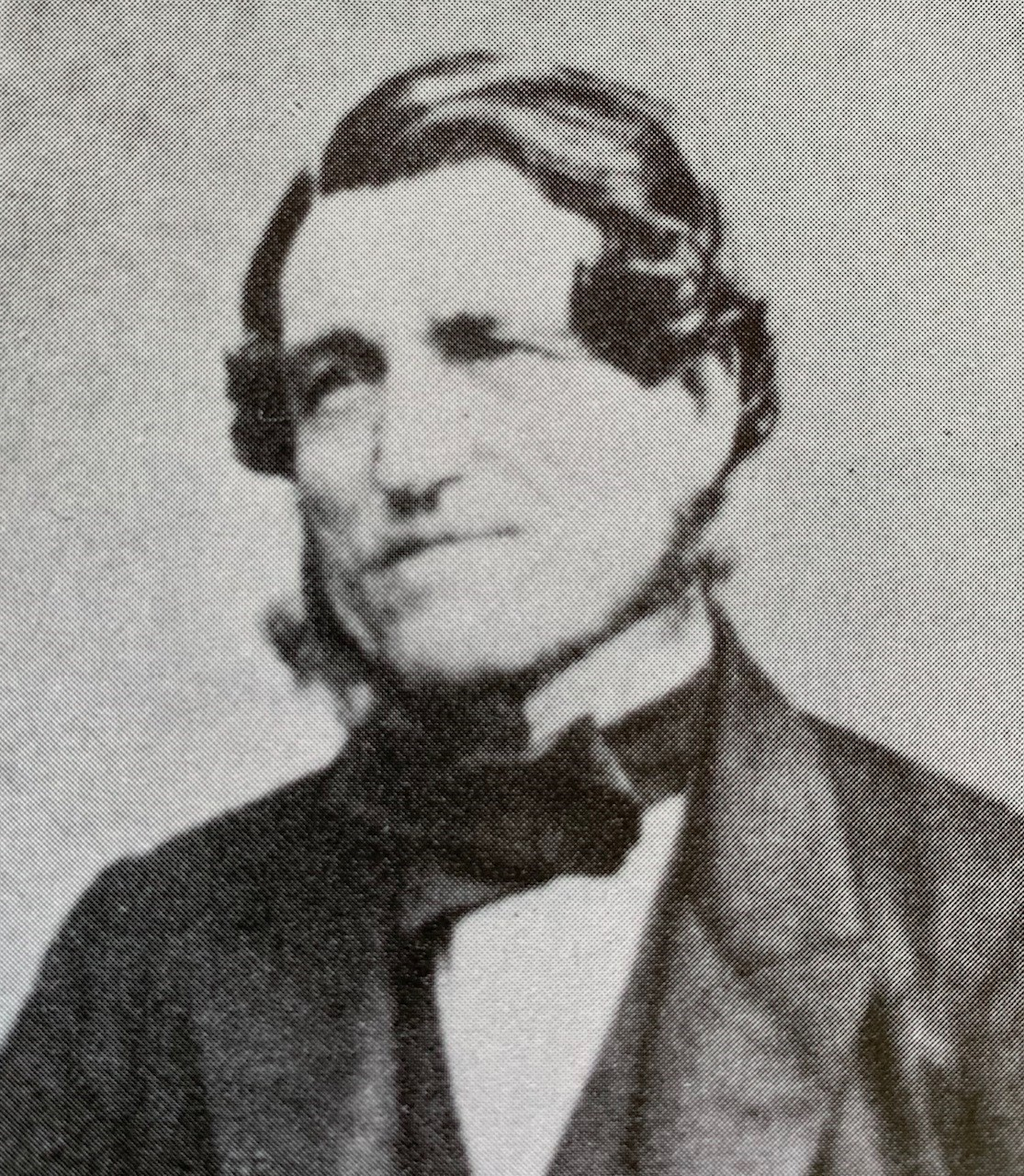
Captain James Killick

James Killick was born on 26 August 1816 in Surrey. The first ship on which Killick served was The Ganges in 1833. Many of the ships he served on were not known but he is next recorded as commander of the Arun in the Canton Press in 1841. He then commanded the John Dugdale in 1845. In 1849 he obtained his Masters Certificate.

Challenger was built in 1852 by Richard & Henry Green, in their Blackwall Yard for Hugh Hamilton Lindsay, London. She was a remarkable departure from the previous ships produced. In 1850 the American clipper ship Oriental visited West India Docks, the largest clipper ship to visit London and the Admiralty was given permission to take her lines, and this was done by Messrs Waymouth and Cornish, both Lloyd's Surveyors, in the dry dock at Green's Yard in Blackwell. This is probably the reason that it was said that Challenger's design was inspired by and had a close resemblance to the Oriental's.

From The Copartnership Herald, Vol. I, no. 8 (October 1931)

...American ships, which still held the supremacy until soon after Richard Green had declared his decision not to be beaten by them. He had a new tea clipper built at his yard at Blackwall, called the Challenger, of 699 tons, and she was sent off to China, Captained by James Killick in 1852. Having loaded tea at Shanghai, she set out for London, calling in at Anjer where she met the American ship, Challenge, which was on her way to London with a cargo of tea from Canton. The Challenge was a 2,000 tonner, built expressly for speed and capacity, and was the largest clipper built by the Americans until that time. So it was that a race home was started by these two vessels, the smaller British clipper gaining London two days ahead of her huge rival. Naturally, this set the hearts of all the British owners aglow, and was instrumental in urging on the efforts of our shippers to capture the China trade.

On 8 August 1853 Captain James Killick commenced another race with Challenger against the American clipper Nightingale from Shanghai. Challenger reached Deal on 26 November, 2 days earlier than Nightingale.

Captain James Killick went on to found Killick Martin in 1863 and purchased Challenger in 1865.

John Smith - Captain of John C.Munro & Maju

John Smith was born in Anstruther, Fife, in 1823. His life at sea saw him rise from a boy on a Greenland whaler, to the position of master of the Lahloo, one of the most successful of the China tea clippers. After the loss of the Lahloo in 1872, Smith was given a position by Killick Martin & Company, first as Captain of John C. Munro in 1873 and then to oversee the building of their New vessel, Maju at Dundee. She was an iron clipper intended for the "China Run", and much was expected of her in the trade. She sailed from Dundee on her maiden voyage bound for Rangoon with Smith in command, but was lost with all hands five days later off Barvas in Lewis, in the "Great Gale of 21st October, 1874". John Smith's body was recovered and he is buried at Riccarton, Ayrshire. Eleven members of the crew are buried at Barvas, Lewis. A book has been written about his life called China Clipper Captain by John Robinson. The house John Smith was born in has a blue plaque to commemorate his life and another he had built in 1870 is also a hotel called The Spendrift both in Anstruther, East Neuk of Fife.

John Gadd – Captain of Kaisow

Captain John Gadd was born in 1825. He took command of Kaisow at 50 years of age in 1875 and stayed with the ship until she was sold in 1885.

In 1883 Kaisow was passing Krakatoa at the time of its eruption. Second mate on Kaisow was Harry Davis, who went on to be a Captain himself, wrote a very graphic account of the experience. He described how Captain John Gadd sailed the ship down the Sunda Straits, braced sharp up, how the ship weathered the erupting island and so got into the open water and felt the tail end of the huge Tidal wave which tore north up the Sunda Straits.

Both sides of the Sunda straights were hit taking out 165 villages. The town of Anjur was completely wiped out, killing approximately 36,000 people. Some estimates for fatalities are as high as 120,000.

The eruption of Krakatoa created the world's loudest sound recorded in human history and could be heard 3,000 miles away. Anyone within 40 miles would have had their eardrums ruptured. Tsunamis caused by Krakatoa reached 98 feet high. The Sumatran coastline was devastated by waves and erosion caused by the blasts. A pressure wave from the third explosion traveled over 670 miles out from the island.

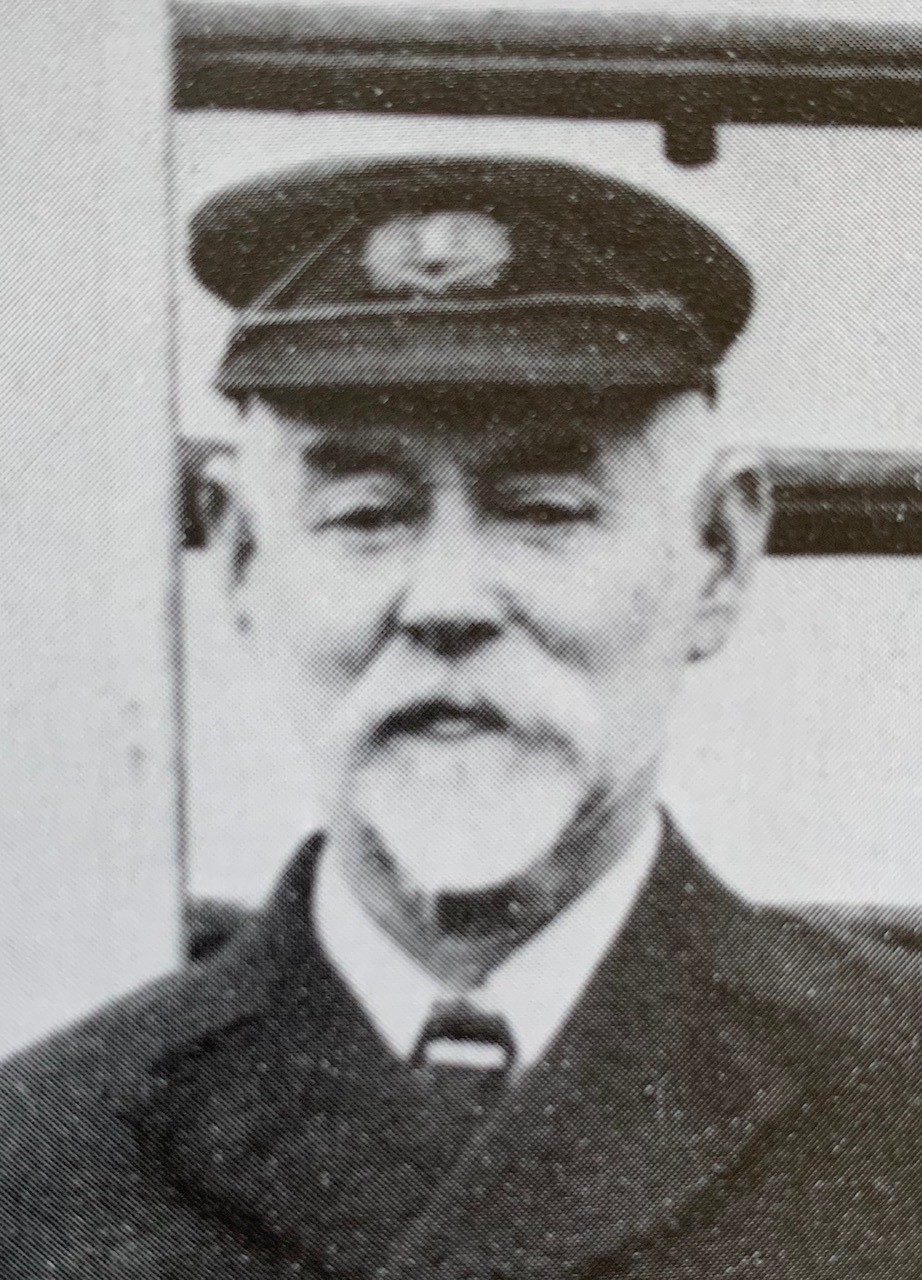
Captain James Lowe

James Lowe - Captain of Agnes Muir

James Lowe was the son of Robert Lowe, another Captain in the Killick Martin & Company fleet. Robert Lowe had been Captain of Osaka for 11 years. James Lowe served in sixteen different ships from 1864 to 1918 and was an apprentice on the ‘Taeping’ during the Great Tea Race in 1866. He served as first mate on Killick Martin & Company’s The Sir Jamsetjee Family before being appointed Captain of the Agnes Muir when he was 27 years old. He remained a Captain for Killick Martin & Company until the Agnes Muir was sold in 1869. Later in his career during the First World War James Lowe was Captain of ‘Petroleline’ which in 1918 was shelled by a German submarine whilst crossing the Atlantic. The Petroleline returned fire and escaped the encounter. James Lowe was awarded the Lloyd's silver medal and an O.B.E.

=== House flag (1868) ===
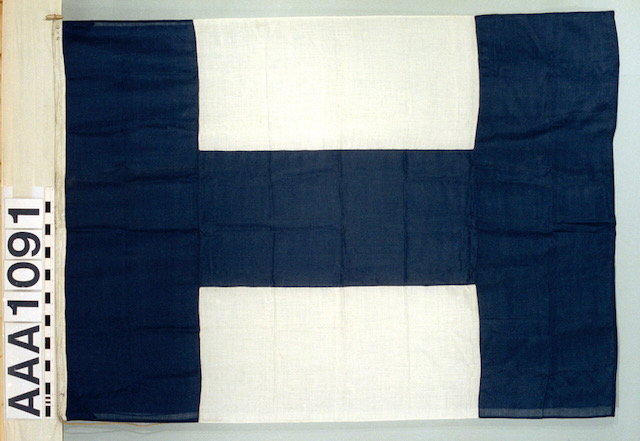
House flag of Killick Martin & Company

Killick Martin & Company initially used a house flag or maritime flag to identify the company's vessels with two blue stripes and a wider white center stripe. From 1868, the design was changed by adding a vertical blue bar to form an "H".

Harry James, a former Captain employed by Killick Martin said that he had suggested to Captain Killick that in his opinion the original flag was too similar in design to a signal flag, so Captain Killick himself requested the addition of a blue bar.

The flag became known as "Killick's H" or the "Hungry H". The exact date of the change is unknown but a sail plan of Obma, a clipper owned by Killick Martin & Company showed the new flag in February 1868. An example of a Killick Martin house flag is held at the National Maritime Museum in Greenwich, London, and one was flown above Trinity House on 15 March 1961 to celebrate the company's 100th anniversary.

=== Ship broking (1861–1999) ===
The first advertised ship of Killick Martin & Company was the Tung Yu, which appeared in The Times on 30 May 1861. In their first advertisements they appear as loading brokers alongside Robertson & Company, these two firms along with Shaw Lowther & Maxton were the leading shipbroking firms of the 1860s and 1870s. Shipbroking and chartering activities continued for the next 100 years. In 1975, Killick Martin & Company Ltd ceased active trading on the Baltic Exchange. In 1985, Killick Martin & Company Ltd acquired Wallace Shipping Chartering Ltd an existing Baltic Exchange broking firm which was then renamed Killick Martin Chartering Ltd. The firm was subsequently sold to Howe Robinson Group.

=== The tea trade (1865–1879) ===
Killick Martin & Company's founder and senior partner James Killick was an experienced sea captain, completing numerous voyages with tea from China, including his record-breaking passage in 1852 with Challenger. After forming Killick Martin & Company it is not surprising that James Killick's primary focus was on the tea trade.

1864 was the first year in which a passage was made by a sailing ship owned by Killick Martin. The ship's name was Heversham, and she carried a cargo of tea from Shanghai to New York. In 1865 the company purchased James Killick's former ship Challenger and took delivery of their first new build Fusi Yama. With the expanding fleet, Killick Martin entered the tea trade to London in 1866. This was the year of the Great Tea Race when Killick Martin's vessels Challenger, Fusi Yama, and Yang-tsze were among the 57 vessels completing voyages. As the Killick Martin fleet multiplied thereafter the company regularly had three or four ships loading tea each season.

Killick Martin also sailed with tea from China and Japan to the American cities of New York and Boston.

By the 1878–79 season, however, steamers had started to take over from sailing vessels on the tea trade to London due to improvements in their reliability, speed, and the opening of the Suez Cannel. The Far East Freight Conference (FEFC) which came into existence in 1879 may also have been a factor. Two Killick Martin vessels completed journeys during this last 'tea' season, Yang-tsze from Fuzhou and Wylo from Shanghai, both to London.

In total Killick Martin's ships are recorded as having completed 36 passages between 1866 and 1879 with tea cargoes from Fuzhou, Shanghai, Hong Kong, Hankou and Yokohama, to London.

As well as operating their own vessels between China, Japan and London during this period, Killick Martin were also brokers for many others. In Lloyd's List of 18 November 1869, Killick Martin are listed as being brokers for the vessels Eleanor, Kawagawa and Yokohama, Taeping, Helen Nicholson, Sir Lancelot, and Guinevere.

=== Trade routes (1878–1886) ===
1878 was the last year Killick Martin & Company took part in the Tea Trade to London and thereafter the general pattern of trade shows that outward cargoes were frequently carried to China and Japan, but were often loaded in Europe or America. Manila in the Philippines became a preferred loading port for homewards, whilst from the 1880s Java in Indonesia and US West Coast offered more opportunities for cargoes. A considerable volume of cargoes were taken from Hong Kong to Hamburg and Le Havre.

Improving telegraphy during this period allowed instructions from Killick Martin & Company's head office in London to be sent to the ships directing them to cargoes and so changing some of the traditional patterns of trade.

Here is a brief summary of trade routes some of the Killick Martin & Company fleet operated within:

Agnes Muir & Lucia traded principally East and Westbound between Europe to Hong Kong.

Lothair & Obma, East and Westbound between Europe and Japan, but also Java, Manila and America.

Kaisow & Wylo Eastbound to various Chinese ports and Southbound to Australia, and in later years both loaded for San Francisco on their return voyages.

Elmstone, John C. Munro and Osaka seem to have had no specific pattern calling at ports both sides of the Pacific.

Hope & Miako, visited many ports within the Islands of the Eastern Archipelago.

The Sir Jamsetjee Family operated mostly East and Westbound between Europe and the Philippines.

=== Boxer protocol (1901) ===
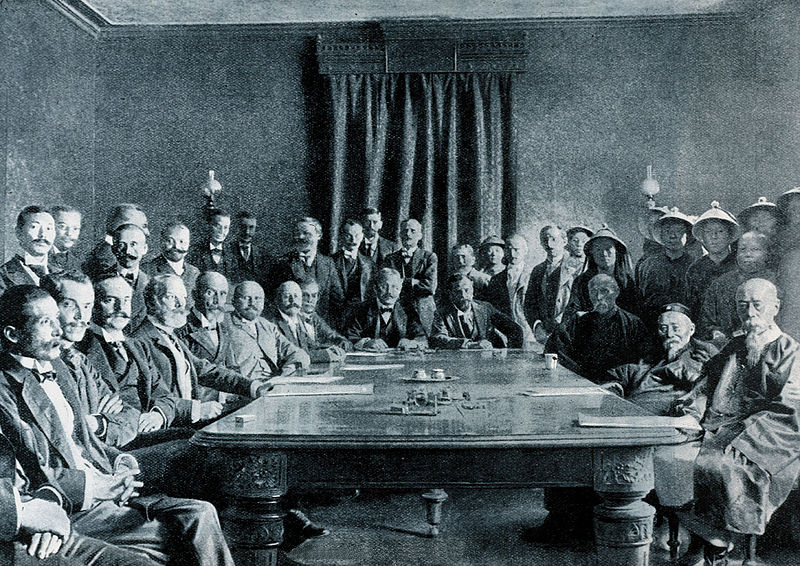
Signing of the Boxer Protocol.

The Boxer Protocol was signed on 7 September 1901, between the Qing Empire of China and the Eight-Nation Alliance that had provided military forces (including Austria-Hungary, France, Germany, Italy, Japan, Russia, the United States, and the United Kingdom) as well as Belgium, Spain, and the Netherlands; after China's defeat in the intervention to put down the Boxer Rebellion.

On 3 March 1925, Great Britain completed negotiations to allow China to use its share of the United Kingdom's Boxer Indemnity which totalled GBP 7,537,500 in 1901, to purchase railway infrastructure and in China.

Killick Martin & Company was selected as agents by the Chinese Government Purchasing Commission, set up in London under Dr. Ching-Chun Wang, Commissioner and Director of the Chinese government Purchasing Commission in 1931 to handle the shipments to China.

Some of the money was used to fund the construction of the Canton, modern day Guanzhou to -Hankow modern day Hankou Railway.

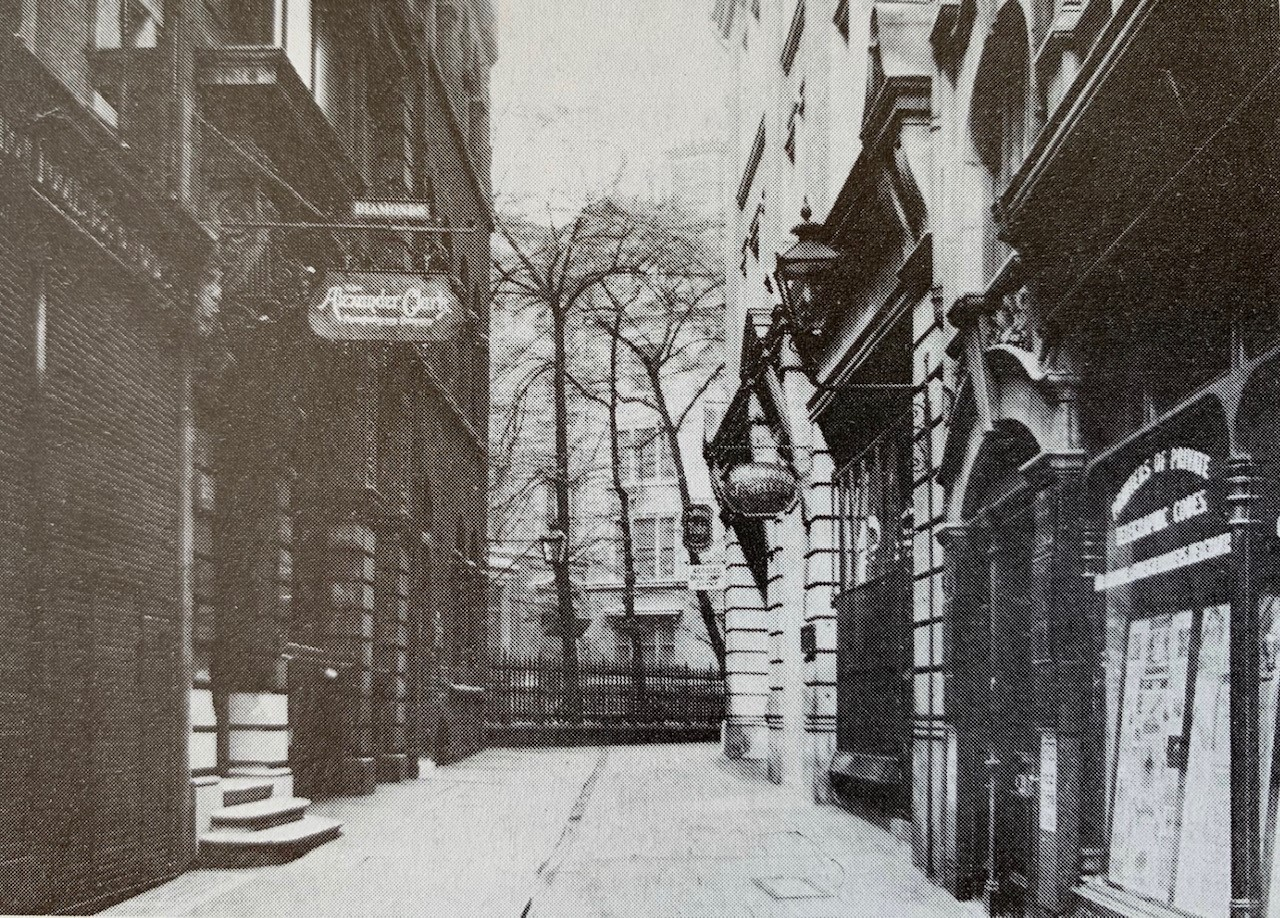
Killick Martin & Company's offices at 7 Fen Court

=== Bombing of Fen Court Offices (1941) ===
Killick Martin & Company moved from George Yard in Lombard Street to 7 Fen Court in September 1886. They purchased the freehold of the building just after the end of the First World War. Some use was also made of 5 Fen Court for storage.

During the blitz on the night of 10/11 May 1941 heavy bombing by the Luftwaffe destroyed the offices of Killick Martin at 7 Fen Court. The contents of the building were entirely destroyed by fire and water. All the firms early records were lost including, alas, a builders model of Challenger. Fortunately, with the help of Brahmapootra Tea Company, a small refuge office had been set up in advance at No. 9 Bishopsgate for just such an emergency and on Monday, 12 May the firm moved into this building where they remained for 2 years. At the end of this time, they moved to Fenton House in Fenchurch Street which coincidentally, was the building in which Elder Dempster had their offices until 1933.

=== Liner agencies (1864–1999) ===
==== William Thompson & Company / Ben Line ====
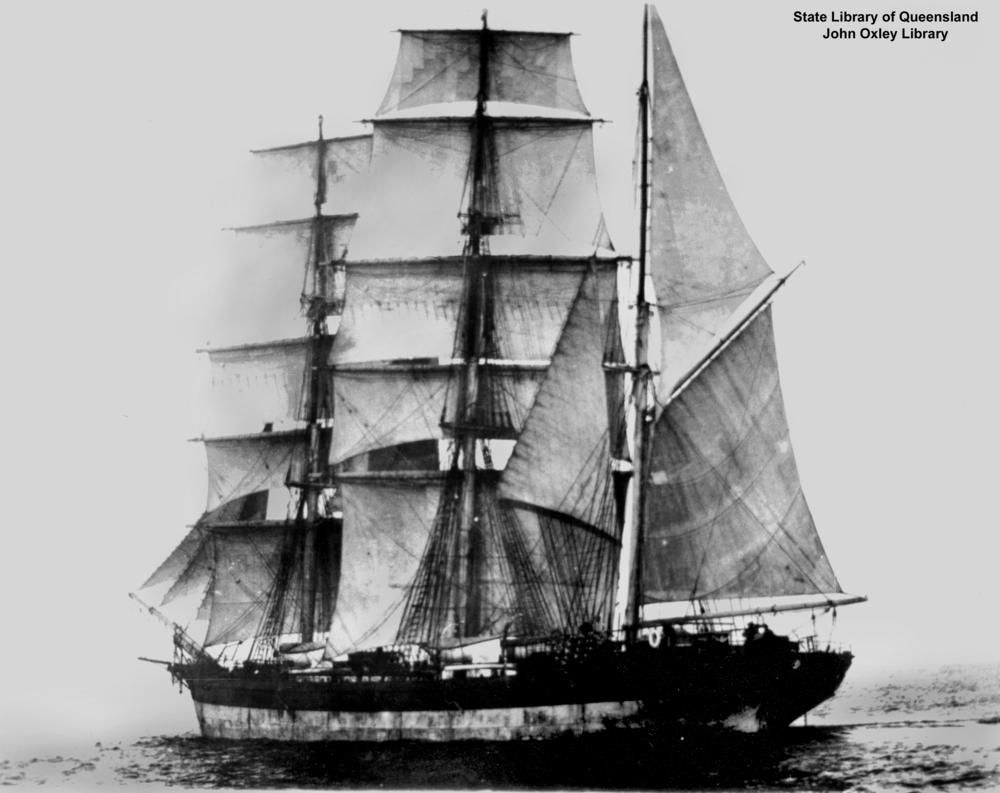
Araby Maid (built 1868)

1864–1914

William Thomson & Company first engaged Killick Martin & Company to act as their agents in 1864 for the vessel Alexander. In 1869 for the vessel Ocean Chief in 1869, and then on four occasions for the vessel Araby Maid between 1870 and 1871.

A gap of ten years took place before they acted again in 1872 and 1873 as agents for Benledi. By 1881 William Thompson's ships were known as Ben Line and had started using the prefix ‘Ben’ within their names. Killick Martin & Company were appointed as agents for all Ben Line vessels in 1883, and within a few weeks loaded their first ship Benarty in Antwerp. The timing for their appointment as agents was ideal in that it assisted with the transition of Killick Martin's business from ship owing to becoming liner agents.

1914–1950

The First and Second World Wars were challenging times for Killick Martin & Company and Ben Line. In 1914 Ben Line had 21 ships, 14 of which were steamers and at the end of the war had lost 10. At the beginning of the Second World War Ben Line's fleet had risen to 20 ships, but by 1945 only 6 remained.

During the Second World War all British ships were requisitioned, but as far as possible the individual liner companies were allowed to continue loading their own ships in their own trades.

Killick Martin & Company's offices in 7 Fen Court, were destroyed by bombing in May 1941.

1950–1970

Between 1950 and 1972, Ben Line continued to develop its liner services between Europe and the Far East, with Killick Martin & Company as its UK Agents operating fast, custom built tween deck vessels. Ben Line pioneered a number of new trade routes, and became one of the leading liner companies in the trade.

1970-1992

Containerised services began in the Far East trade towards the end of 1971. Ben Line and Ellerman Lines together formed Ben Line Containers (BLC), with Ben Line owning 80% of the shareholding in March 1970 and appointed Killick Martin & Company Ltd as its agents. With these developments Killick Martin & Company found itself at the centre of the shipping industry's transition into containerisation of the Far East trade.

Three BLC container ships were constructed, Benalder VI (1972), Benavon IV (1973) and The City of Edinburgh (1973) each with a displacement of 75,000 tons and 3,000 TEU. During a year's operation each of these vessels could do the work of 7 conventional vessels.

These ships operated within the 17 strong fleet of a three-nation consortium (the Trio Group) made up of Ben Line, Hapag-Lloyd, Mitsui-OSK (MOL), Nippon Yusen Kaisha (NYK) and Overseas Containers Ltd (OCL) all engaged in the Far East trade. Although the operation of the ships were integrated within Trio (the name coming from the companies owning the vessels originating in three countries, Great Britain, Germany and Japan) each company marketed its services separately, and BLC did this via Killick Martin & Company.

Trio's UK service called at Southampton and Killick Martin & Company's Southampton office managed all BLC ships. Offices were also opened within Barking, Birmingham and Leeds container bases. This expansion together with the general growth in other trade lanes with the move into containerisation saw Killick Martin & Company's employee number grow to an altimeter high of 530 in 1974.

BLC's ships served an expanding number of ports across the Far East throughout the 1970s. The ships were converted from steam turbine to diesel between 1980 and 1981. At this point container capacity was also increased on all three vessels. In the face of increasing competition on the Far East route, these three vessels were deemed in need of replacement by 1992, at which point the cost of doing so was too great and so they were sold to the East Asiatic Company (EAC) of Denmark in 1992, and Killick Martin & Company Ltd's agency terminated with the subsequent sale of EAC to A. P. Moller / Maersk Line in 1993.

==== Alfred Holt & Company / Blue Funnel Line ====
In 1920 Alfred Holt & Company's ‘Blue Funnel Line’ started a service with Ellerman Lines & Bucknall known as the Far East Line and appointed Killick Martin & Company as their agents for this service as well as for Ben Line as each service offered alternative UK ports.

In 1935 Blue Funnel Line purchased Glen Line, a direct competitor to Ben Line in the Far East Europe trade lane. Despite this acquisition creating potential conflicts for Killick Martin & Company no changes were made by any party at this time.

The Far East trade stopped in 1942 with the Japanese capture of Singapore. During the war Blue Funnel Line lost 30 vessels. After the war all parties agreed it was difficult for Killick Martin & Company to continue to represent both Ben Line and Blue Funnel Line so a mutual decision was made between all parties that Killick Martin & Company should sadly terminate the Blue Funnel Line agency. Killick Martin & Company would continue to represent William Thompson & Company's Ben Line.

==== Elder Dempster Lines ====
MV Aureol was a passenger/cargo ship, along with her sister ships, MV Apapa and MV Accra and the last flag ship of the Elder Dempster Lines fleet. Together with her sister ships, she operated services to Ghana and Nigeria. She was sold in 1974. In 1933 Sir Richard Holt, Chairman of Elder Dempster Lines wrote to Killick Martin & Company informing them of their London offices were to close and invited Killick Martin & Company to represent them. Sir Richard Holt, senior partner in Alfred Holt & Company has been asked to undertake the reconstruction of Elder Dempster Line after it went into administration by their administrator. Sir Richard Holt's relationship with Killick Martin & Company dated back to the period when they were agents for Alfred Holt & Company. 15 employees from Elder Dempster Lines London offices were transferred to Killick Martin & Company. MV Aureol was a passenger/cargo ship, along with her sister ships, MV Apapa and MV Accra and the last flag ship of the Elder Dempster Lines fleet. Together with her sister ships, she operated services to Ghana and Nigeria. She was sold in 1974.

In 1951 Elder Dempster Lines took over the British & Burmese Steam Navigation Company and in 1957 took a 33% stake in Nigerian National Shipping Line, although sold this to the Nigerian government in 1961.

In 1965 Elder Dempster Lines cam under the ownership of Ocean Steamship Company (Blue Funnel Line) and in 1970 acquired Shaw, Savill & Albion Line.

In 1983 Killick Martin & Company celebrated the 50th anniversary of its partnership with Elder Dempster Lines.

The end for the Elder Dempster Lines name came to in 1989 when it was bought by the French firm Delmas. Delmas was in turn brought by CMA-CGM in 2005 and fully integrated into CMA-CGM in 2016 when the name was dropped.

==== Geest Line ====
Geest Line appointed Killick Martin & Company Ltd in 1964 to find return cargo to destinations in the West Indies. Until 1964 the ships sailed to the UK with Bananas, but had returned empty. The UK port was Liverpool, but was switched to Preston and then Barry in South Wales.

==== Lykes Line ====
In 1966 Lykes Line of New Orleans appointed Killick Martin & Company Ltd as their UK agents.

Lykes Line did have a London office, but this was closed and an owners representative office was established in Killick Martin & Company's offices and some employees were also transferred.

Between 1970 and 1972 Lykes Line acquired three new ‘seabee’ vessels. These vessels also known as Type C8-class ships were called the SS Doctor Lykes, now Cape Mendeco), SS Almeria Lykes, now SS Cape May, and SS Tillie Lykes, now SS Cape Mohican and could carry both containers and floating barges. They served the United States Gulf ports and Northern Europe. In the UK until 1985 they served the London berth in the River Thames at Gravesend Pier but after that the service was switched to the Port of Felixstowe.

In 1986 the three ‘Seabee’ ships were transferred to the US Navy's Military Sealift Command. They were used in Desert Storm and Desert Shield operations.

These ships were replaced with the Tyson and Tillie Lykes, 2,000 TEU container vessels built in 1985.

Until 1994 Lykes Line was the nominated North Atlantic carrier for all US Military cargo.

In February 1997 Lykes Line filed for chapter 11 bankruptcy and was acquired by CP Ships at which point the agency agreement with which was acquired by a Hapag Lloyd in 2006.

==== United Arab Shipping Company ====
In 1972 Kuwait Shipping Company (KSC) appointed Killick Martin & Company Ltd as its agents. Four years later KSC merged into the United Arab Shipping Company (UASC). A joint company formed by the governments of Kuwait, UAE, Bahrain, Saudi Arabia, Iraq, and Qatar. UASC also appointed Killick Martin & Company Ltd as its agents. By the mid-1980s Killick Martin & Company Ltd's business for the Middle East grew substantially and the volumes handled were second only to those in the Far East trade for Ben Line.

In 1985 Killick Martin & Company Ltd acquired a majority share holding in Wallace Shipping Chartering Ltd which was renames Killick Martin Chartering Ltd and a 50% holding in United Arab Chartering Ltd. The other shareholder in both these companies being Kuwait Shipping Agencies Ltd.

Killick Martin & Company remained UASC's agent until 1999.

UASC was merged into Hapag Lloyd in 2017. The deal gave a relative valuation of the two businesses at 72 percent for Hapag-Lloyd and 28 percent for UASC. At the time of the merger, UASC was 51 percent owned by Qatar and 35 percent owned by Saudi Arabia government, with the remainder held by other Arab states.

=== Atlantis Air (1947) ===
On 21 April 1947 Atlantis Air Ltd was formed by Killick Martin & Company together with Elder Dempster (Canary Islands) and appointed Skyways to commence a thrice weekly service from June that year between Northolt and Gando Grand Canaria via Lisbon using Avro York aircraft.

Elder Dempster (Canary Islands) later sold their investment to William Thompson & Company.

Atlantis Air Ltd also operated a De Havilland Dove G-ANPH purchased for £24,000 between 1954 and 1966 from London Airport (Croydon) to Amsterdam for charter. One of its most famous charters was in 1957 to take Sir Winston Churchill Field Marshall Lord Bernard Montgomery and Sir Edward Heath, an MP at the time, to Newmarket Racecourse.

In the mid-1960s Atlantic Air had an office in Building 88 at Heathrow Airport which assisted its sister company Killick Martin & Company Ltd when it was asked by Cathay Pacific to take responsibility for its first-ever cargo flight into Gatwick Airport.

=== Killick Vogt (1980–1993) ===
Killick Martin & Company Ltd formed a joint venture with Vogt & Maguire Ltd in 1980.

Vogt & Maguire Ltd where established shipping agents in London and Liverpool, incorporated in 1953 like Killick Martin & Company, but with a history stretching back over 100 years.

Killick Vogt Ltd set up sub-office arrangements in various ports so that the shipping line agency business of both parent companies could be handled throughout the country.

In November 1986 Killick Martin & Company Ltd acquired the other 50% shareholding from Vogt & Maguire Ltd and in its financial statement as of 31 October 1987 the company was dormant. In December of that year, its name was changed to Killick Martin Services Ltd. The company was dormant under this name between 1987 and 1990.

In May 1990 the companies name was changed from Killick Martin Services Ltd to Dolphin International Freight Services Ltd and was sold in April 1993.

=== Freight forwarding (1921–present) ===
Killick Martin & Company commenced freight forwarding services in 1921. The company at the time was organised into three areas of activity. The liner agency for Ben Line, the liner agency for Holt/Blue Funnel Line and a freight forwarding division.

Unfortunately little is known of its early freight forwarding activities as all records were lost in the bombing of 7 Feb Court in 1941.

Killick Martin & Company continued to offer freight forwarding services after World War II, but it was the rapid development of its liner agency business that became its key focus.

To address this and offset its declining liner agency business in the early 1990s, Killick Martin & Company Ltd was restructured in 1996 into four separate operating companies, and one of these, KM International Ltd took control of all freight forwarding activities.

The other divisions were Eastgate Transport Ltd, United Arab Agencies Ltd and Killick Martin Chartering Ltd, which was 51% owned.

When Killick Martin & Company Ltd was on the verge of administration in June 1999, a director of KM International Ltd acquired with another partner the business from the then appointed administrators, (which incidentally was originally the company registered as Atlantis Air Ltd in 1947), and changed the name from KM International Ltd to Killick Martin & Company Ltd.

Killick Martin & Company was first offered for sale to Atlantic Pacific Group Ltd in 2014.

The former director who acquired the business from the administrators in 1999 transferred in 2015 with a number of employees to Atlantic Pacific Global Logistics Ltd and operated Killick Martin as a division. Atlantic Pacific Group Ltd decided to separate these activities back into a separate company in July 2017 to focus on supply chain management and freight forwarding services.

== Awards ==
Killick Martin & Company won the British International Freight Awards (BIFA) Supply Chain Management Award 2022. This followed on from their BIFA 2021 European Logistics Award win, and their Finalist category selection for the BIFA Ocean, Cool Chain and Supply Chain Management Awards in 2020.

== Legacy ==
Killick Martin & Company has several artefacts in museums, buildings and monuments around the world which form part of its history which are available to visit and view today.

Whitehall Whitehall is a timber-framed historic house museum in the centre of Cheam village, Sutton, Greater London. It is thought to have been a wattle and daub yeoman farmer's house originally. It is Grade II* listed on Historic England National Heritage List.

Whitehall is the birthplace of James Killick and was home to the Killick family for 175 years[1].

The house was bought by the borough in 1963 from the Killick family and following restoration, it was opened to the public as a historic building in 1978, and is run by the London Borough of Sutton and the Friends of Whitehall.[7] The museum closed in 2016 for a £1.6m refurbishment of the building. It reopened in June 2018.

Statue of Richard Green A statue by Edward William Wyon (1811–1885), of Richard Green (1803–1863) stands outside the Poplar Baths London. On the sides of the statue there are two Bas reliefs, to commemorate his shipbuilding exploits; on one side is the Arapiles which was still under construction in his shipyard on his death, and on the other side the record-breaking Clipper Challenger which he built in 1852 to challenge American rivals in the tea trade. Challenger's first Captain, and winner of two tea races was James Killick. James Killick went on to purchase Challenger for Killick Martin & Company in 1865.

Museum of London Docklands, London

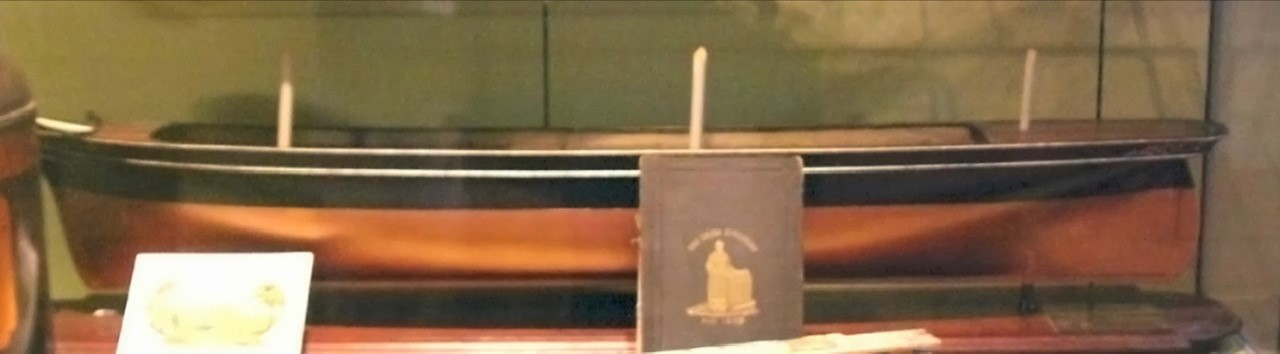
Model of Lothair

There is a builder's model of Lothair in the Museum of London Docklands. Lothair was built by John and William Walker at Lavender Dock, (now Lavender pond) Rotherhithe and launched on 2 July 1879, it may well have been the last large composite clipper to have been built on the Thames. Lothair was owned by Killick Martin & Company between 1873 and 1885 by which time she was one of only four tea clippers left afloat (the others being Titania, Blackadder, Cutty Sark and Lothair, shipwrecked in 1910.

A model of Lothair also exists in the Hong Kong Museum of History.

Fries Scheepvaart Museum, Holland The Figurehead of Wylo Is in the Fries Scheepvaart Museum in Sneek, the Netherlands. Item number FSM-J-122. The figurehead is a multi-colour painted image of a Moor with skirt and bared upper body. The head of the Moor is adorned with a turban, with earrings in his ears. The pedestal is decorated with spiral, leaf and diamond motifs. A finger has been broken off the right hand. The name Wylo is derived from Chinese, and has the meaning 'speed'.

Wylo was a composite clipper, built by Robert Steele & Company, Greenock, and launched on 15 April 1869. Robert Steele & Company also built the famous clippers Ariel and Taeping who took part in the great tea race of 1866, and Sir Lancelot another renown clipper ship.

Wylo was the 174th and last vessel to be built by Robert Steele & Company. She was 192.9 ft in length, had a beam of 32.1 ft, a depth of 20.2 feet and weighted 829 gross tons.

In 1886 Wylo was in a collision with the French steamer Henri IV at. Wylo was badly damaged and beached on the Princess Louise Embankment to prevent her from sinking, but was later condemned and broken up.

National Maritime Museum, London

Along with the "House Flag" of Killick Martin & Company, object number: AAA109 mentioned in the History section of this site the National Maritime Museum also contains a coloured lithograph by Thomas Goldsworth Sutton titled Clipper Ship “Kaisow” Outward Bound from 11 May 1869. Object number: PAH8580.

== Gallery ==
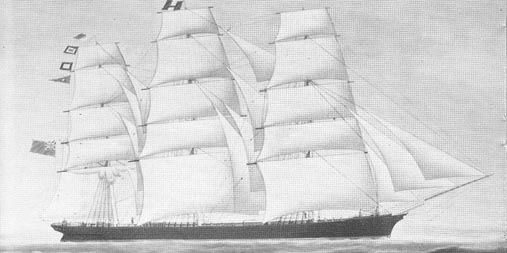
Wylo

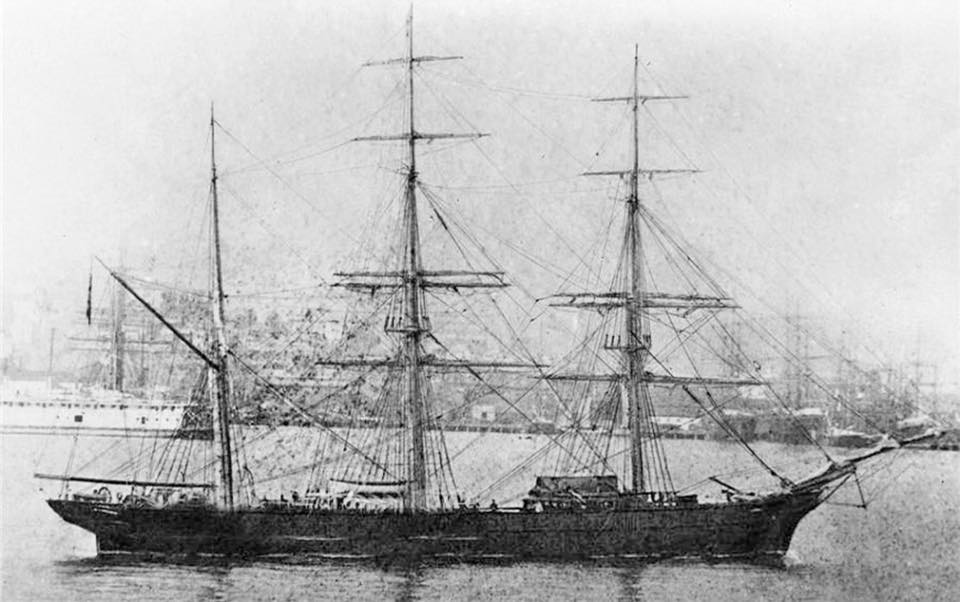
Kaisow

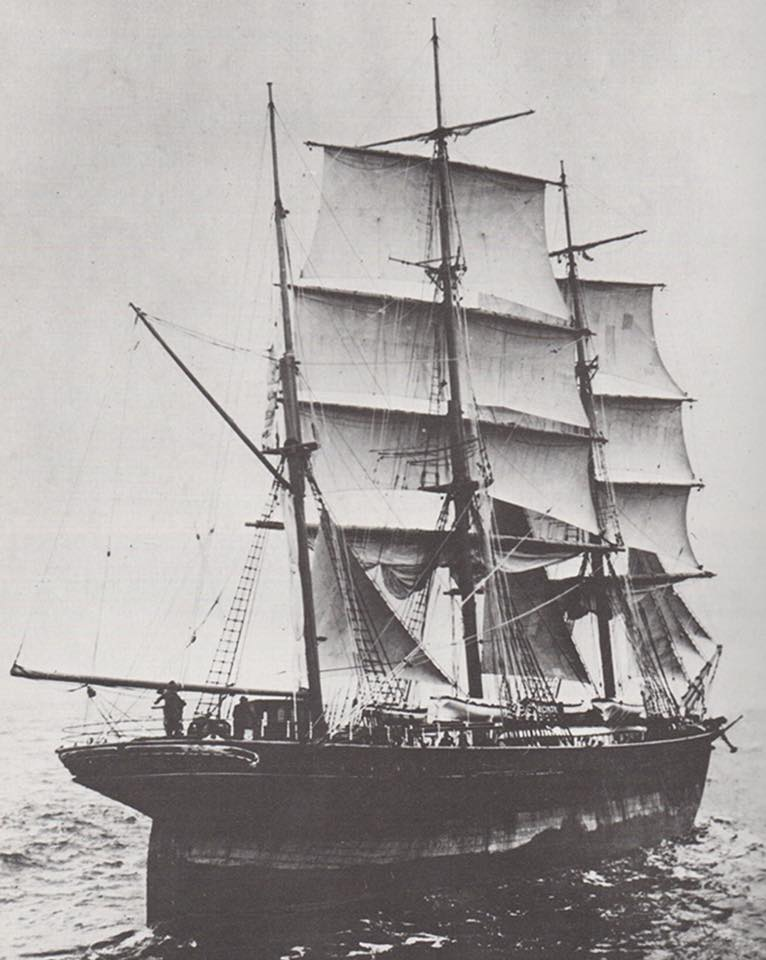
Lothair

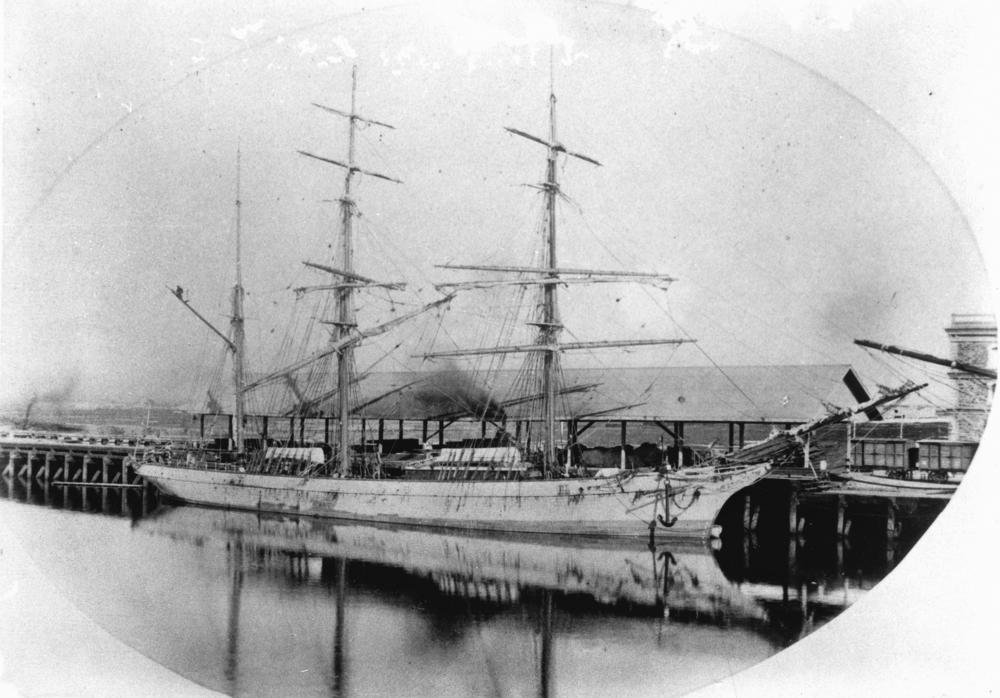
Osaka

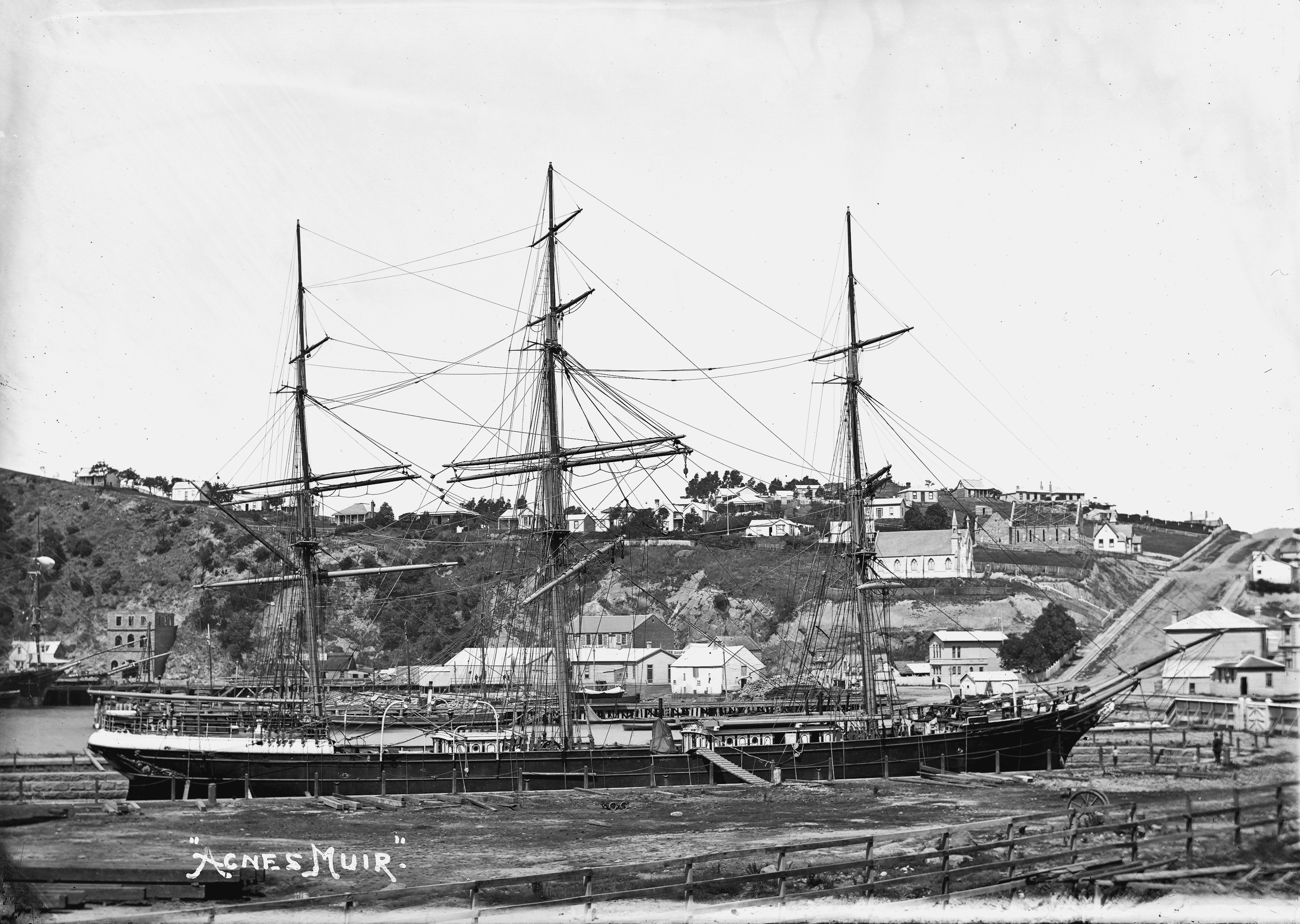
Agnes Muir

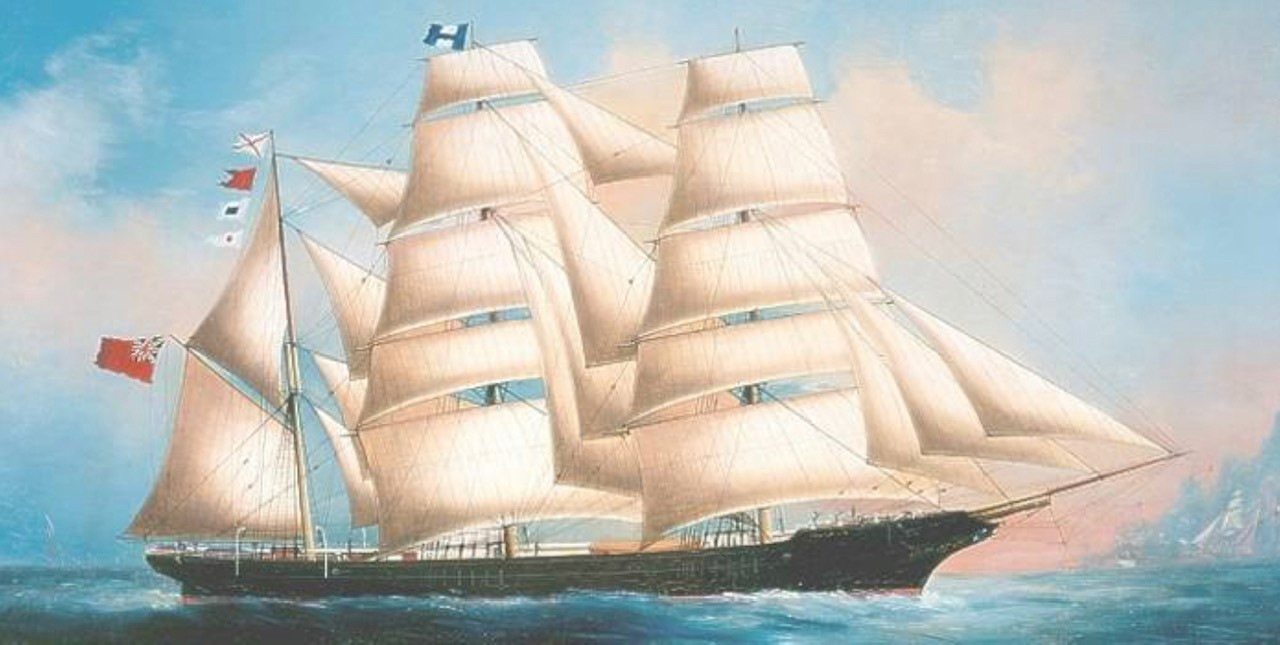
John C. Munro

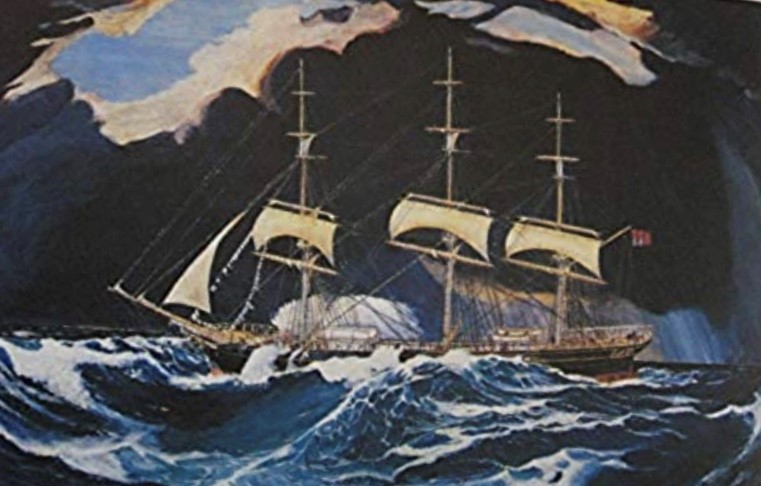

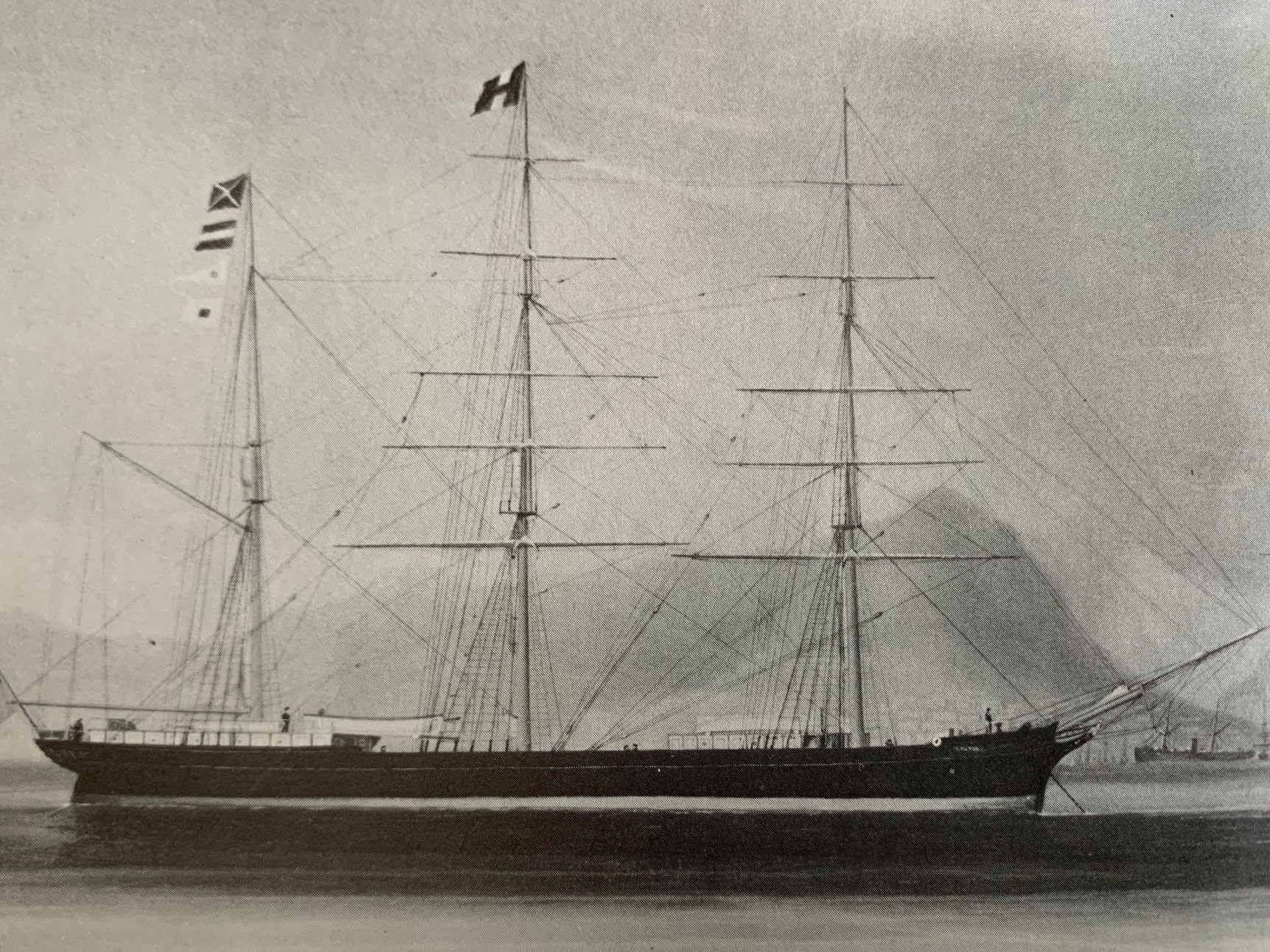

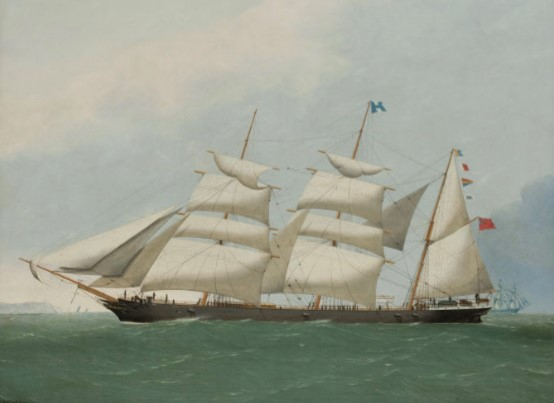
Mabel Young

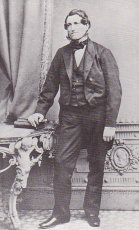
James Killick

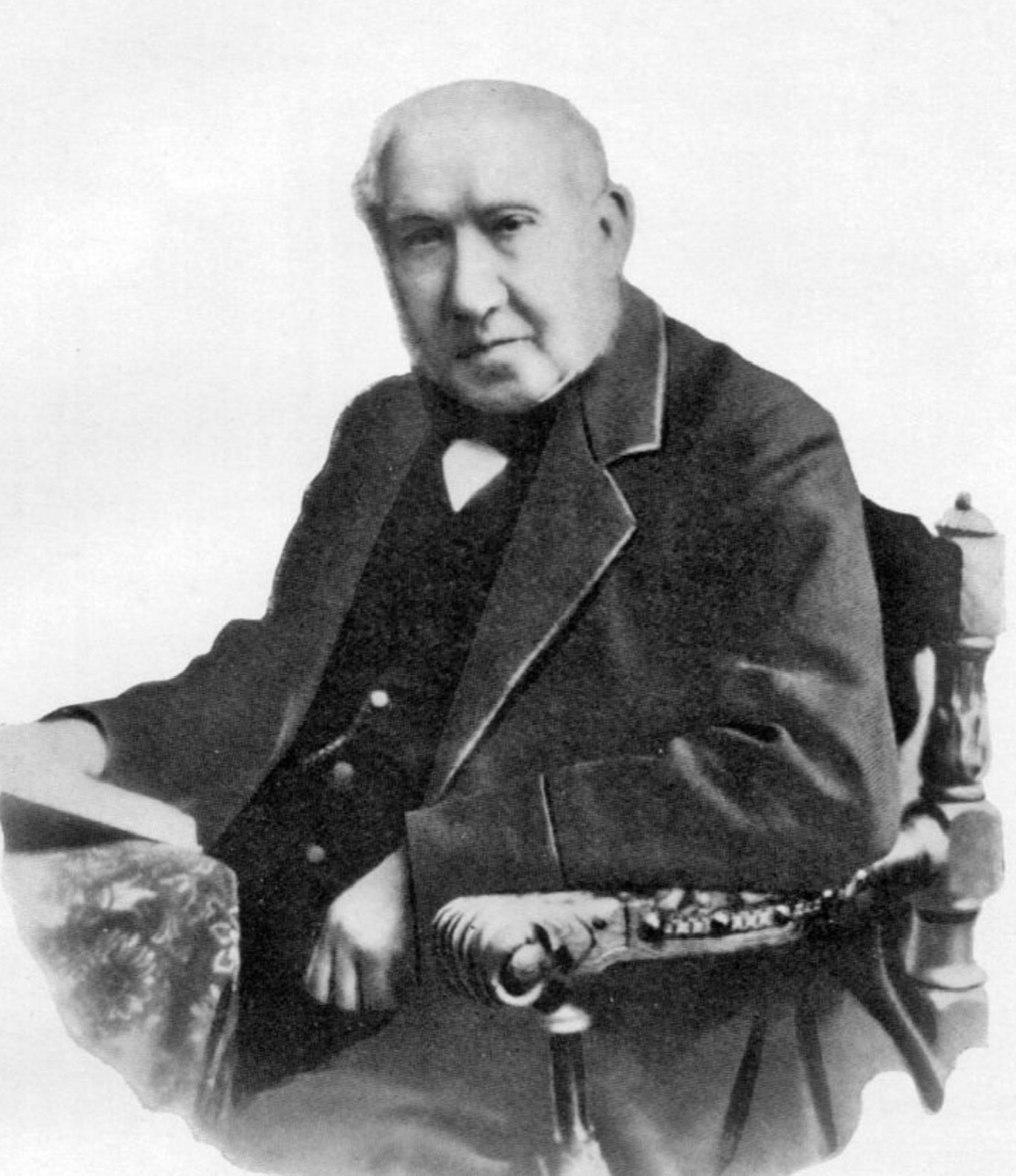
Edward Boustead
