= Scheepvaartmuseum =

Scheepvaartmuseum may refer to:

- Nederlands Scheepvaartmuseum in Amsterdam, the Netherlands
- Fries Scheepvaart Museum in Sneek, The Netherlands
- MAS Nationaal Scheepvaartmuseum
