= Fusi Yama =

Scottish composite barque

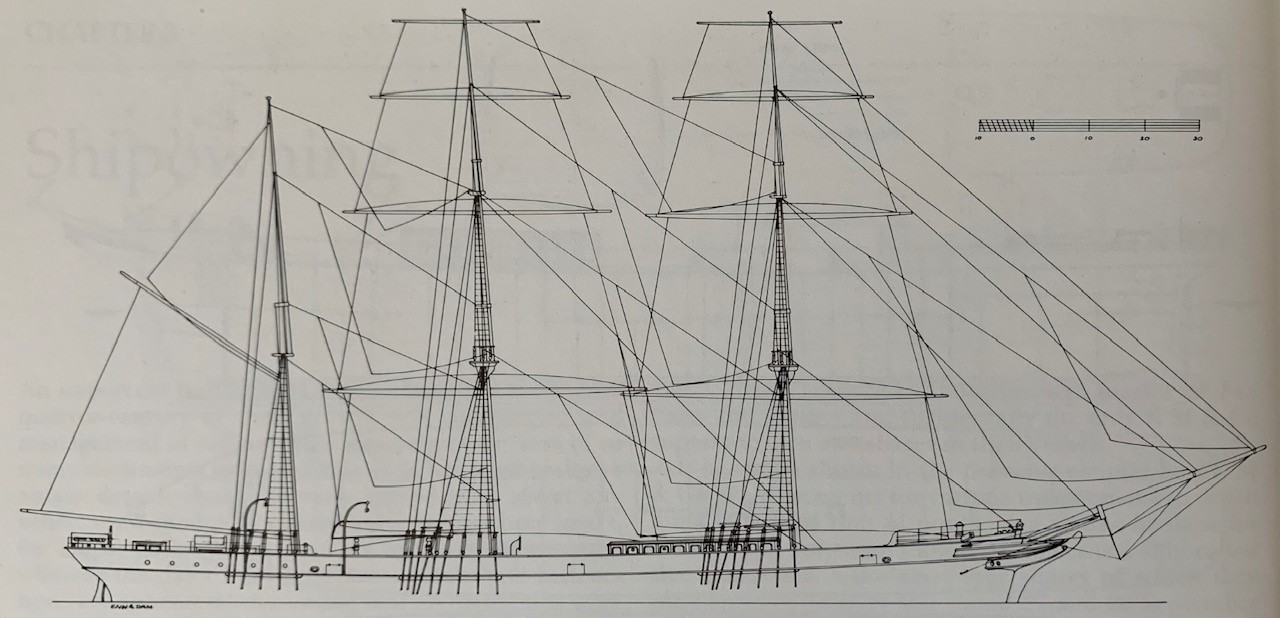

History

United Kingdom
- Name: Fusi Yama
- Owner: Killick Martin & Company
- Builder: Alexander Stephen & Sons, Glasgow
- Launched: 27 June 1865
- Fate: Sunk 26 July 1870

General characteristics
- Class & type: Composite clipper
- Tonnage: 556 GRT; 556 NRT
- Length: 165.5 ft (50.4 m)
- Beam: 28.1 ft (8.6 m)
- Depth: 17.1 ft (5.2 m)

Fusi Yama was a composite barque ship of roughly 556 tons, built in 1865 by Alexander Stephen & Sons at Glasgow for Killick Martin & Company, London.

Launched on 27 June 1865 in Yard no 83 Fusi Yama was one of three vessels built by Alexander Stephen & Sons for Killick Martin & Company, the others being Obma and Mabel Young. Her dimensions were 165'5" x 28'1" x 17'0", tonnage 526.26 under deck, 31.12 break, 556.37 gross and net register.

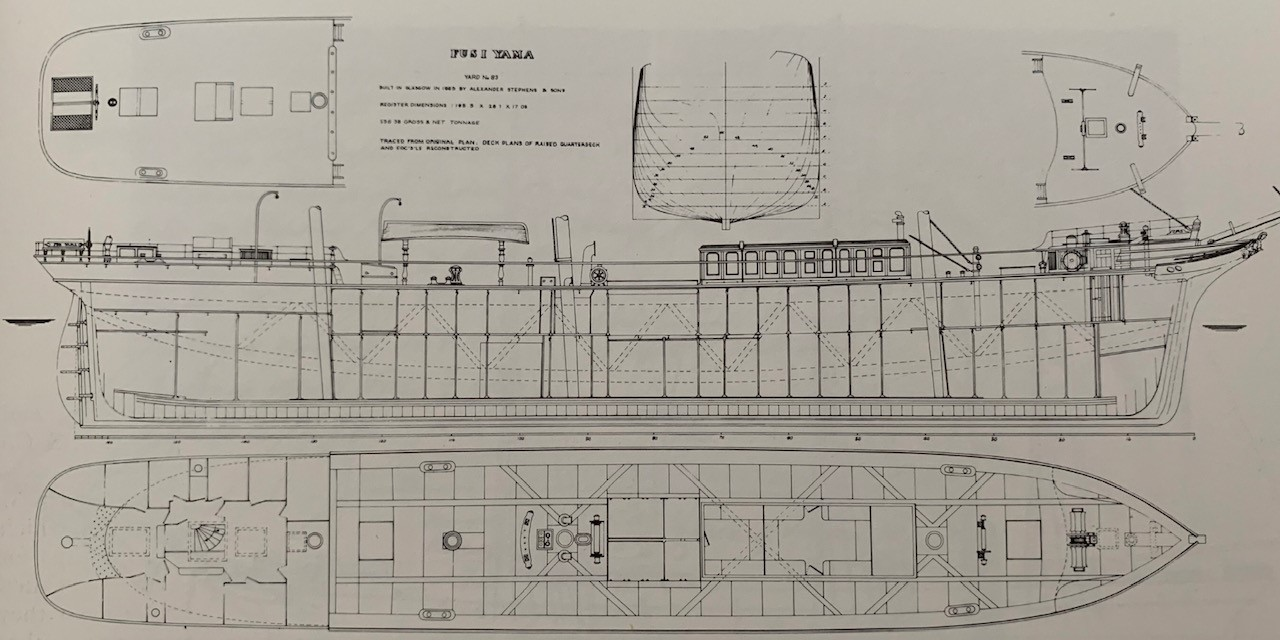
Alexander Stephen & Sons builders plans for Fusi Yama

== Specification ==
Her keel measured 14.5" x 10" American Rock Elm, Frames 4" x 3.5" x .5" in angle with reverse angles. Her frames spaced 18", Floors 18" x .5", keelson Plat 12" x .75", garboard strake 12" x 10" made of American rock elm. 5" to 4" plank in elm and teak, garboard to topside, with decks constructed of yellow pine.

Her keel was fastened using keel plate with 1.5-inch galvanized iron screw bolts, spaced 18 inches apart. The plate measured 20 inches x .7 inches with frames and doubling pieces riveted to the same. Bilge Kelson formed with 7" × .75" bulb bar and 2 angle bars 4" x 3.5". Bilge Plates 20" x .5", placed zig zag extending all fore and aft and diagonal tie plates on beams 10" x .5" diagonals have been fitted on both tiers of beams. Bolted with 7/8 yellow metal screw bolts and Nuts. Garboard strakes horizontally bolted to the Keel with 7/8-inch yellow metal bolts.

3 bower anchors, 1 stream anchor and 2 kedge anchors, 270 fathoms of 17/16-inch chain cable.

1 long boat and 2 others, rigging of galvanized wire and hemp, Built under special survey, Coopered with yellow metal on felt.

Foremast, mainmast, mizzenmast and bowsprit of iron, made up of 3 plates, Fore and main lower and topsails yards or iron, made up of 2 plates.

2 capstans, 2 winches, raised quarterdeck, monkey forecastle, Large house on deck for crew.

Single topsails, no skysails, set stunsails.

== Owners ==
Registered no 211 in 1864 at London on 10 July 1865.

The shareholders in the vessel were Killick Martin & Company with 20 shares, Samuel Mackenzie, merchant with 11 shares, George Frederick Thomson, shipowner 8 shares, John Paton Watson, merchant 16 shares, Henry Philip Baylis, gentleman of Norfolk 5 shares and Duncan Forbes, gentleman of Aberdeen with 4 shares.

George Fredrick Thomson was both a shareholder and captain of the vessel, which had a crew of 20 in total.

== Key events ==
She was employed in the China tea trade. Captain George Frederick Thomson was given command of the vessel.

In 1865 she sailed from London to Kanagawa, Japan, in 171 days.

In 1868 the former first officer Mogens Christian Borup became captain.

She never made any passages either out or home in less than 119 days although she did go from Singapore to Boston in 91 days in the spring of 1870.

On 27 July 1870 she was run into and sunk off Lizard Point in the English Channel by the American ship Liverpool. She sank in only a few minutes after the collision. Her crew numbered 18 at the time of the accident and 13 were rescued by the Liverpool after jumping overboard. Those who drowned were the master, Captain Borup, two able seamen, James McDonald and William Franks, and two boys, Samuel Ariell and James Fraiser.
