= Maju (iron ship) =

Iron full-rigged ship

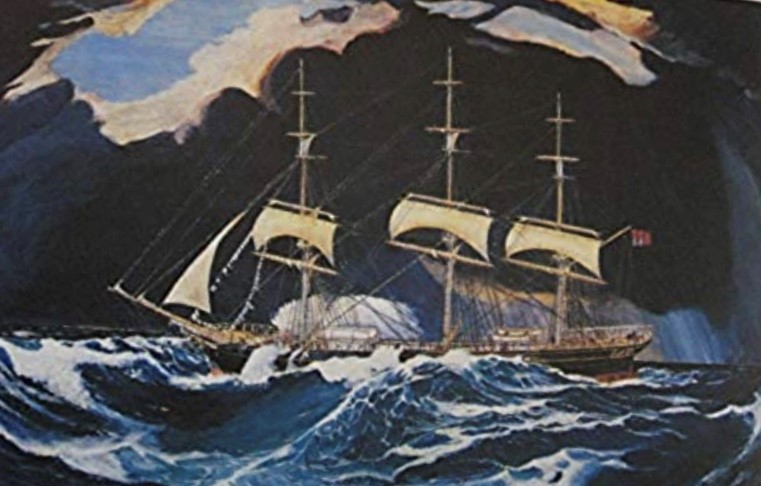

History

United Kingdom
- Name: Maju
- Owner: Killick Martin & Co, London
- Builder: Brown & Simpson, Dundee
- Launched: 27 August 1874
- Fate: Wrecked 21 October 1874

General characteristics
- Class & type: Iron Full-rigged ship
- Tonnage: 953 GRT
- Length: 201.5 ft (61.4 m)
- Beam: 32.1 ft (9.8 m)
- Depth: 21.2 ft (6.5 m)

Maju was an iron full-rigged ship built in 1874 by Brown & Simpson, Dundee, as Yard No. 28. Dimensions 6201'5"×32'1"×21'2" and 953 GRT, 918 NRT. Equipped with Napier's patent windlass and Low and Duff's patent pumps.

Maju, whose name means ‘Successful’ in Malay was a fully rigged iron ship built for Killick Martin & Company, captained by John Smith shipwrecked with the loss of the vessel and all hands on her maiden voyage in 1874.

Captain John Smith had previously been captain to another Killick Martin & Company ship, John C. Munro was given the job to supervise the building of Maju in Dundee. Prior to this he had commanded the winner of the 1870 tea race the Lahloo

== Specification ==
Keel 8" x 2.4"; Frames 4.5" x 3" x 0.5" angle; Spacing of frames 23"; Floors 24" x 0.5"; Single Plate Keelson, 14" x 0.7" with rider plate and 4 angle irons; garboard strake 35.5" x 0.6"; gunwale plate 38" x 0.8"; Deck 3.5" Pine.

3 bower anchors; 1 stream anchor; 2 kedge anchors; 270 fathoms of 1.8" chain cable; 90 fathoms 0.9 chain cable; also hawsers.

Napier's patent windlass; 1 capstan and 2 winches; Low and Duff's patent pumps; rigging wire and hemp; 4 pairs of scuppers and 5 pairs of freeing ports; 2 no 24' long boats; 1 no 23' long boat 1 no 18' long boat; carried 47 sails, incl double suits of some.

Size of hatchways: main, 15' 3" x 8' 6"; Fore, 6' x 6'; quarter, 7' 8" x 7' 1".

Fore and main masts and their lower yards, and bowsprit are of iron.

Fore lower mast, 77' long; 26" diameter at deck .

Main lower mast, 79' 0.5" long; 26" diameter at deck.

Bowsprit 37' long; 19' 05" diameter at bed.

F and M lower yards, 73' long; 17" diameter at slings.

Mizen lower masts, 69' 0.75", made of wood.

outside painting; 1 coat read lead, 1 of oxide, 2 coats anti-fouling compositions; inside cement in bottom to bilge, then 1 coat oxide, 2 coats red and white lead.

== Owners ==
Registered as of no 213 in 1874 at London

The shareholders in the vessel were Killick Martin & Company with 40 shares, Edward Boustead, Merchant with 16 shares, William Lowther Nicholson, Shipowner 8 shares.

== Key events ==
27 August 1874

Launched at the shipyard of Brown & Simpson, Dundee, for Killick Martin & Company.

The ships christening ceremony was performed by Miss Margaret Ann Smith, the eldest daughter of the ship's Captain John Smith.

16 October 1874

Sailed from Dundee on her maiden voyage bound for Rangoon with a cargo of coal.

21 October 1874

Wrecked near Barvas, Hebrides, in a gale.

Maju sank about 12 miles west from Stornoway. She was identified when 7 bodies, 3 Lower Masts and a piece of the boat's stern were washed ashore.

All 24 of her crew drowned, they were:

John Smith, captain, native of Fife,

Wm. Aitken, chief mate, Edinburgh

Chas. S. Scantleburgh, second mate, Cornwall

David Taylor, carpenter, Dundee

John Waters, sailmaker, Kirkcaldy

John Waterston, steward, Anstruther

Wm. Henderson. cook, St Andrews

Henry Smith, A.B., Hull

David Hosie, A.B., Carnoustie

J.S. Eleridge, A.B. Boston, England

George Caithess, A.B., Westhaven

George Drummond, A.B., Tayport

S. Haesbrook, A.B., Ostend

Charles Seven, A.B., Sweden

William Allen, A.B., Portsmouth

Thomas Guy, A.B., Dundee

Frank Langley, A.B. Jersey

Charles Wallace, A.B., Youghal

Thomas Murray, O.S., Dundee

John Milne, O.S., Aberdeen

Reuben Kerr, apprentice, Edinburgh

William Brown, apprentice, Edinburgh

Duncan Paul, apprentice, Edinburgh

Daniel Henessy, apprentice, Dundee

Captain John Smith's body was recovered and he is buried at Riccarton, Ayrshire. Eleven members of the crew are buried at Barvas, Lewis.
