= Elmstone (barque) =

English composite barque

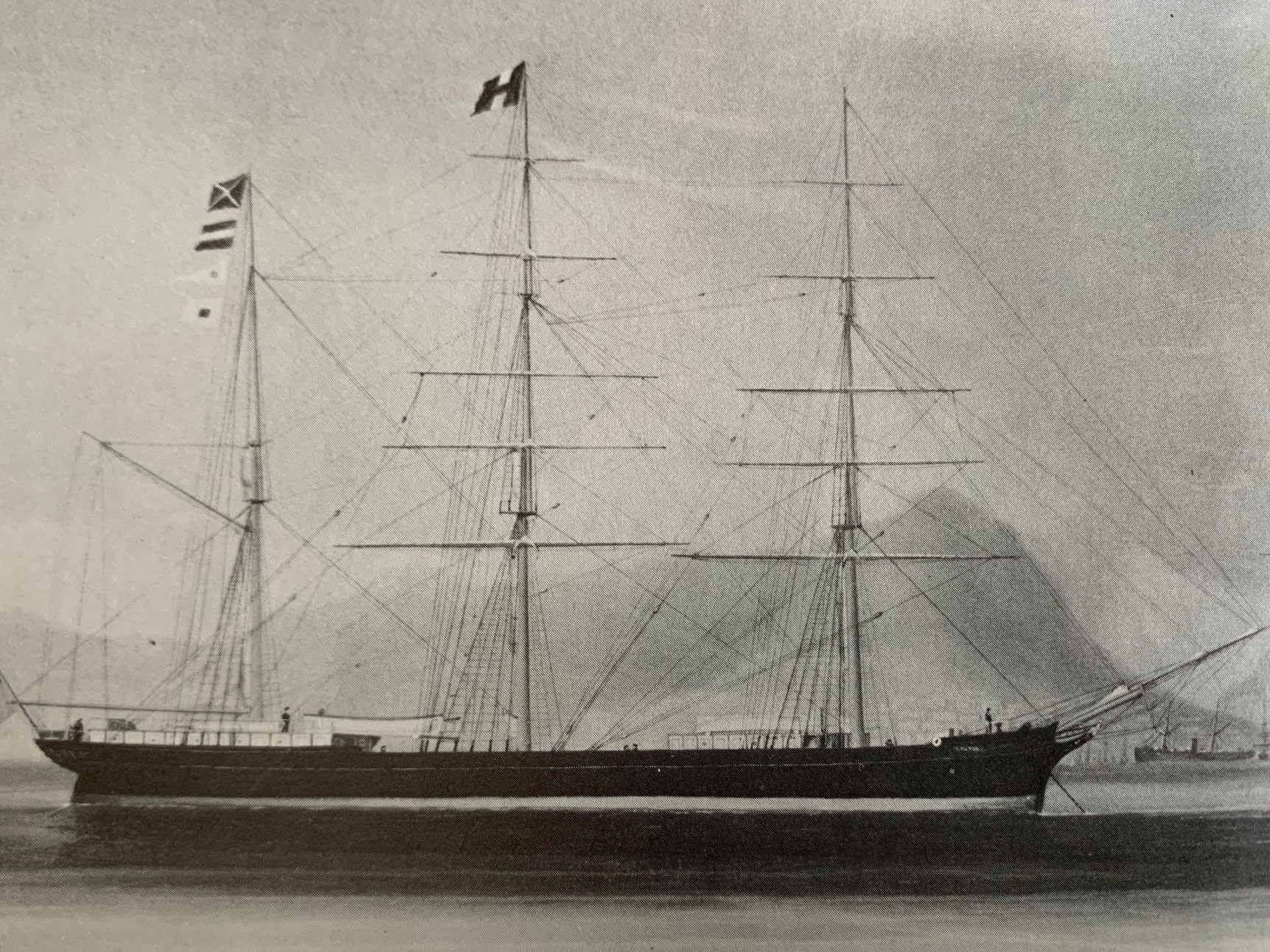

History

United Kingdom
- Name: Elmstone
- Owner: John Charles Buckle, Bristol
- Builder: G.S. Moore & Co, Sunderland
- Launched: 27 October 1866

United Kingdom
- Owner: Killick Martin & Company
- Acquired: 4 September 1873

Austria
- Owner: T. Cossovich, Ragusa
- Acquired: 20 August 1884
- Fate: Disappeared from register

General characteristics
- Class & type: Composite clipper
- Tonnage: 698 GRT; 698 NRT
- Length: 166.5 ft (50.7 m)
- Beam: 31.5 ft (9.6 m)
- Depth: 18.6 ft (5.7 m)

Elmstone was a composite barque built in 1866 by G.S. Moore & Co at Sunderland for John Charles Buckle, Bristol.

Launched on 27 October 1866, she was assigned the official German Reg. No. 53187 and signal MJCS.

The ship's dimensions were 166 ft 6 in (50.75 m)×31 ft 5 in (9.58 m)×18 ft 6 in (5.64 m) Tonnage 645.98 under deck, 7.45 half poop, 45.02 round house, 698.45 Gross and Net Register.

== Specification ==
Keel 14.5 in × 15.5 in (370 mm × 390 mm) American and English Elm, Frames 3.5 in × 3.5 in × .5 in (89 mm × 89 mm × 13 mm) angle, with reverse angles to each frame; Spacing of Frames 18 in (460 mm), Floors 20.5 in × .5 in (521 mm × 13 mm), single plate keelson 14 in × 0.75 in (356 mm × 19 mm) above floors, garboard strake 10 in × 7 in (250 mm × 180 mm) American Rock elm. 5 in (130 mm) Plank, garboard to topside in elm and Dantzic oak, decks 3.5 in (89 mm) yellow pine.

The vessel has 25 diagonal plates on each side crossing each other and extending from the sheer to the bilge plates, riveted to them and to the frames they pass over. The keel plate, also the main keelson plate and angle irons, extend up the fore and after deadwoods to the main deck. The whole of the fastenings are of yellow metal to the height of one fifth of the depth of the hold below the upper side of the upper deck, above which the fastenings are of galvanized iron. the planking is fastened with 0.9 in (23 mm) screw bolts driven from outside

3 bower anchors, 1 stream anchor and 2 kedge anchors, 120 fathoms of 1.7 in (43 mm) chain and 150 fathoms of 1.5 in (38 mm) chain, also hawsers etc.

Capstan and winch, windlass, 2 metal pumps and 2 bilge pumps, rigging of wire and hem, 1 long boat and 2 others.

Coppered with Yellow metal on felt to top of wales before launching.

Fore and main lower masts and bowsprit or Iron of following sizes,

Fore lower mast, 69 ft 4 in (21.13 m) long 23 in (580 mm) diameter at deck

Main lower mast, 70 ft 2 in (21.39 m) long 23.05 in (585 mm) diameter at deck

Bowsprit, 36 ft (11 m) long 22 in (560 mm) diameter at middle.

== Owners ==
Registered no 20 in 1866 at Bristol

1866 -73 owned by John Charles Buckle of Bristol.

1884 -99 owned by Killick Martin & Company

1884 -99 owned by T Cossovich of Ragusa, Later registered at Trieste

1900 sold to owners in Genoa until disappeared from the register.

=== Share ownership under Killick Martin & Company ===
Registered no 191 in 1873 at London

4 September 1873, Killick Martin & Company held 64 shares.

17 September 1873, Killick Martin & Company sold 8 shares to William Lowther Nicholson, Shipowner, 8 shares to Samual Mackenzie, shipowner, 8 shares to William Henderson, shipowner, all of london.

20 Dec 1879, Samuel Mackenzie died intestate and letters of administration dated 13 Jan 1880 were granted to Mary Mackenzie, Widow.

14 Dec 1880, Mary Mackenzie sold 8 shares to Killick Martin & company.

20 Aug 1884, Registry closed on Vessel sold to Austrians as per advice from Killick Martin & Company.

== Key events ==
1866 Launched on 27 October at the shipyard of G.S. Moore & Co., Sunderland, for John Charles Buckle, Bristol.

1868 under captain John Tomlinson sailed from London to Otago, New Zealand in 90 days after the best passage of the season. Carrying general cargo and passengers.

1873 Sold to Killick Martin & Company and Thomas Bragg made Captain.

1873 sailed from London to Sydney, Australia in 109 days.before sailing onto Manila

1874 sailed from Manila to New York, USA in 159 days carrying 700 tons dry sugar and 2000 bales of hemp.

1875 sailed from London to Shanghai, China in 121 days.

1876 sailed from London to Hong Kong in 149 carrying general cargo.

1877 Clement Henderson late first mate of The Sir Jamsetjee Family, another Killick Martin & Company owned ship made Captain.

1878 Sailed Liverpool to Manila in 119 days.

1884 Sold In August to T. Cossovich, Ragusa. Later registered at Trieste

1900 Sold to owners in Genoa

1903/06 Disappears from the registers
