= John C. Munro (clipper) =

Iron full-rigged ship

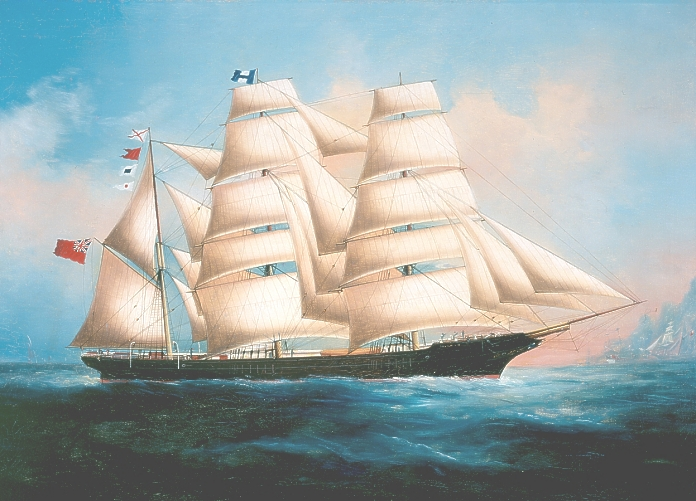
- John C. Munro off Hong Kong

History

United Kingdom
- Name: John C. Munro
- Owner: George Lawson Munro & Co, London
- Builder: James Laing, Sunderland
- Launched: 8 November 1862

United Kingdom
- Owner: Killick Martin & Company, London
- Acquired: 1873

United Kingdom
- Owner: Thomas Dobson Woodhead & Co, Hull
- Acquired: 1885

United Kingdom
- Owner: Cockerline & Co, hull
- Acquired: 1892

Sweden
- Owner: Nils C. Corfitzon and partners, Helsingborg
- Acquired: 13 June 1893
- Renamed: Norman
- Fate: Wrecked 1 July 1896

General characteristics
- Class & type: Iron Full-rigged ship
- Tonnage: 612 GRT
- Length: 169.2 ft (51.6 m)
- Beam: 28.2 ft (8.6 m)
- Depth: 18.5 ft (5.6 m)

John C. Munro was an iron full-rigged ship built in 1862 by James Laing, Sunderland. Dimensions: 169"2'×28'2"×18'5" and tonnage: 612 tons.

She was launched on 8 November at the shipyard of James Laing in Sunderland, for George Lawson Munro & Company, London. Assigned the official British Reg. No. 45076 and was deployed in the China trade.

Key Events:

1869 Sailed from Amoy (Xiamen) to New York in 99 days.

1872 LR 1872-73: Master: Captain J. Kidder.

1873 Sold to Killick Martin & Company, London. Captain John Smith. (Former Captain of Lahloo) Of the 64 shares issued in the vessel John C. Munro, 32 were owned by the Killick Martin & Company's joint managing owners James Killick, James Henry Martin and David William Richie. The other 32 were owned by Edward Boustead.

Sailings recorded for Killick Martin & Company include transits to Hong Kong, Amoy (Xiamen), New York, Bremen, Valparaiso, Liverpool, Queenstown, Bangkok, Chittagong, Cardiff, Pitcairn Island, Melbourne and Victoria.

1885 Sold to Thomas Dobson Woodhead & Company, Hull.

1892 Sold to Cockerline & Company, Hull.

1893 June 13 Sold to Nils C. Corfitzon and partners, Helsingborg, for £1450 and was renamed ‘Norman’. Assigned the official Swedish Reg. No. 612 and signal JBRV. The new measurements were 51,80×8,31×5,59 meters and 641 GRT, 618 NRT and 900 DWT. Captain Edward Julius Hellgren, Helsingborg, owner of a 11/30 part was appointed master of the ship.

1896 June 15 Sailed from Sydney with a cargo of guano for Mauritius.

1896 July 1 Wrecked on the east coast of Eastern Fields, British New Guinea, just east of the entrance to Torres Straits. The crew of the captain's boat was picked up by a steamer while the mate's boat managed to reach the coast of New Guinea.
