= Mabel Young (barque) =

Iron barque

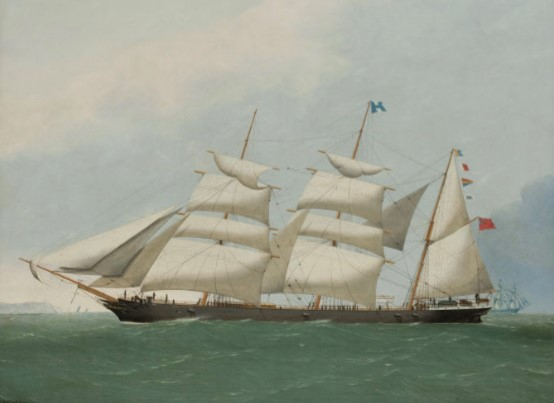

History

United Kingdom
- Name: Mabel Young
- Owner: Killick Martin & Company, London
- Builder: Alexander Stephen & Sons, Glasgow
- Launched: 21 November 1877
- Fate: foundered 31 July 1879

General characteristics
- Class & type: Iron barque
- Tonnage: 1,046 GRT
- Length: 211 ft (64.3 m)
- Beam: 33.6 ft (10.2 m)
- Depth: 20.45 ft (6.2 m)

Mabel Young was an iron barque built in 1877 by Alexander Stephen & Sons, Glasgow, as Yard No. 215. Dimensions: 211'0"×33'6"×20'45 and tonnage: 1046 GRT, 1015 NRT. Rigged with royals, over single topgallant and double topsails.

The vessel was launched in November 1877 at the shipyard of Alexander Stephen & Sons, Glasgow, for Killick Martin & Company, London. Captain Joseph Smith Crane late of the same owner's ship John C. Munro.

Killick Martin & Company owned eight shares in the vessel, Edward Boustead eight shares, and his partners William Wardrop Shaw eight shares and Jasper Young 40 shares. It is surmised that the vessel was named after Jasper Young's wife or daughter.

17 January - 2 June 1878

Sailed from Glasgow to San Francisco in 136 days.

30 July - 25 November 1878

Sailed from San Francisco to Liverpool in 118 days with a cargo of wheat. The Dallam Tower which sailed on the same day as the Mabel Young arrived to Liverpool 122 days out.

23 December 1878 - 15 April 1879

Sailed from Liverpool to Calcutta in 113 days

10 June 1879

Sailed from Calcutta for Dundee with a cargo of 1220 tons of jute, 150 tons of bone dust and 50 tons of old iron.

31 July 1879

Foundered some 30 miles SE of Algoa Bay on voyage from Calcutta to Dundee with a cargo of jute.
