= Lothair (clipper) =

British clipper

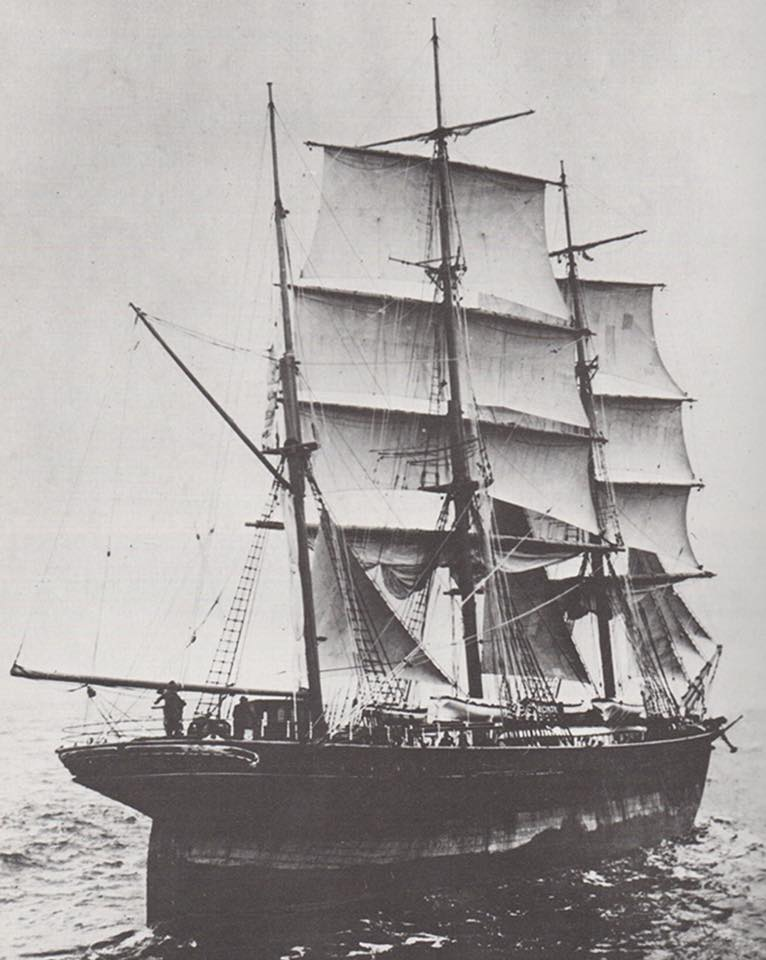
- Lothair

History

United Kingdom
- Name: Lothair
- Owner: William Waker
- Builder: William Waker, Lavender Dock, Rotherhithe
- Launched: 2 July 1870

United Kingdom
- Owner: Killick Martin & Company, London
- Acquired: 7 July 1873

United Kingdom
- Owner: William Bowen, Llanelly, Carmarthenshire
- Acquired: 1885

Italy
- Owner: G. Buccelli & D. Loero, Genoa, Italy
- Acquired: 1891

Peru
- Owner: F.G. Piaggio, Callao, Peru
- Acquired: 1905
- Fate: Lost in 1910

General characteristics
- Class & type: Composite clipper
- Tonnage: 823.95 GRT; 793.58 NRT
- Length: 191.8 ft (58.5 m)
- Beam: 33.5 ft (10.2 m)
- Depth: 19 ft (5.8 m)
- Sail plan: fully rigged ship

Lothair was a British clipper built by William Walker and launched in Rotherhithe, London, on 2 July 1870. After many years of service as a tea clipper, she was operated by merchants in Italy and Peru before being lost in 1910.

== Name ==
Lothair was named after British Prime Minister Benjamin Disraeli's 14th novel Lothair, published on 2 May 1870. The novel was well received and even Charles Dickens welcomed Disraeli back to the "brotherhood of literature". The first edition sold out immediately. A degree of Lothair mania struck England, with a perfume, a racehorse, a street and a ship all being named after the novel. A perfume with the name Lothair is still produced today by Penhaligon's, who were perfumers to Queen Victoria.

== Construction ==
Lothair was of composite construction, planked in rock elm and teak. The fore and main lower masts were of iron - all other spars were of wood. She was probably the last composite ship built on the Thames.

== Career ==
The launch of Lothair was celebrated in some style. C. Fox Smith describes the event as follows:

At the time of her launch the Thames shipbuilding trade had been greatly depressed for some years, so the event was hailed as an augury of better times in store. She took the water in July, 1870, amid the cheers of a large crowd of spectators, and the launch was followed by a big luncheon, presided over by Mr. Walker, at which many leading shipping people were present.

Lothair was one of the fastest tea clippers, judged to be in the top dozen or so by Andrew Shewen. On her maiden voyage under Captain Emlyn Peacock, departing London on 10 September 1870, she reached Yokohama, Japan, in 135 days. There is a contemporary description of her speed, quoted in Stuart Rankin's Shipyards, Granaries and Wharves walk:

I was second mate of a Newbury Port ship, and we were running our easting down bound out to Canton, and we were somewhere near Tristan d'Acunha when we sighted a vessel astern. It was blowing hard from the nor' west and the next time I looked a couple of hours later, there was the ship close on our quarter, and we doing 12 knots. "Holly jiggers" says I to the mate "there's the Flying Dutchman "Naw," says he, "It's the Thermopylae." But when she was abeam a little later, she hoisted her name, the Lothair, and it's been my opinion ever since that she was making mighty close to 17 knots.

This was quite a compliment – the Flying Dutchman was a ghost ship of maritime legend, and the Thermopylae was renowned as the fastest tea clipper on the sea, a reputation seriously challenged only by the Cutty Sark. Records of some of the Lothair's achievements are as follows:

- 10 September 1870 – 23 January 1871. Sailed from London to Yokohama in 135 days.
- 23 March – 1 July 1871. Sailed from Yokohama to New York City in 96 days.
- 8 January – 2 April 1878. Sailed from Amoy to New York in 84 days (a record).
- 12 June – 15 September 1882. Sailed from London to Hong Kong in 95 days.
- 31 October 1884 – 6 February 1885. Sailed from Hong Kong to New York in 98 days.

In 1873, Lothair was purchased by Killick Martin & Company, the company led by Captain James Killick of Challenger fame, and sailed in the tea trade to ports such as London, New York City, Yokohama and Hong Kong. David MacGregor adds that in 1873–1874, under the ownership of Killick Martin & Company, she made the fastest passage in the fair monsoon between Hong Kong and Deal, which took her only 89 days. She was particularly fast in light winds.

In 1885, Killick Martin & Company sold Lothair to William Bowen, Llanelly, Carmarthenshire, for use in the South American trade. Though she also sailed to China again under this ownership).

In 1891, she was sold to G. Buccelli & D. Loero, of Genoa, Italy, and finally in 1905 to F.G. Piaggio, of Callao, Peru. Lothair was lost in about 1910.
