= Agnes Muir =

Scottish iron full-rigged ship

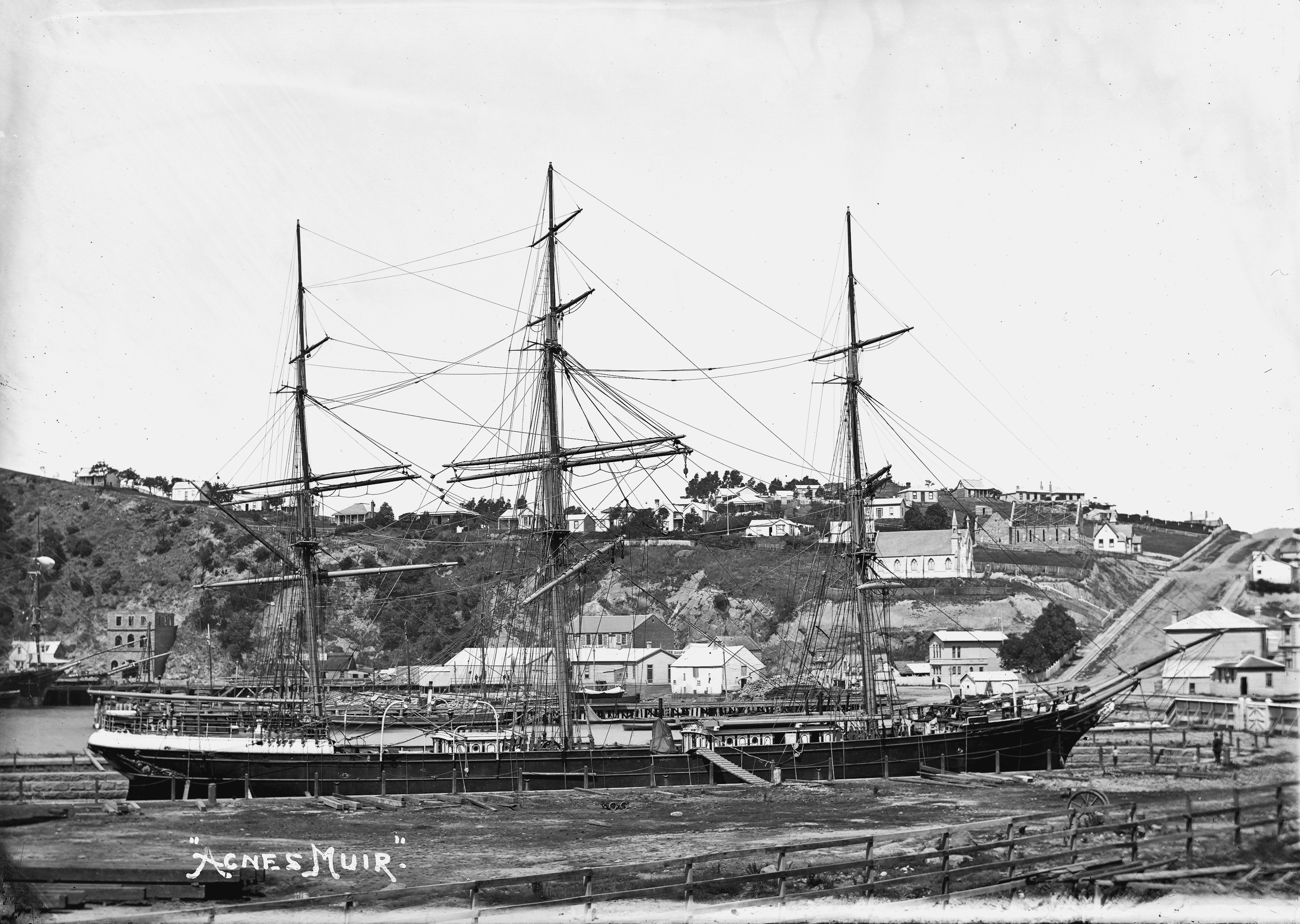
- A photo of Agnes Muir

History

United Kingdom
- Name: Agnes Muir
- Owner: James Galbraith and partners, Glasgow
- Builder: Robert Duncan & Co, Glasgow
- Launched: 13 March 1869

United Kingdom
- Owner: Killick Martin & Company
- Acquired: 27 July 1874

Germany
- Owner: E. Tobias
- Acquired: 19 May 1885
- Renamed: Adele

Germany
- Owner: Lübken, Elsfleth
- Acquired: 1899

General characteristics
- Class & type: Iron full-rigged ship
- Tonnage: 851 NRT
- Length: 197.5 ft (60.2 m)
- Beam: 32.2 ft (9.8 m)
- Depth: 19.9 ft (6.1 m)

Agnes Muir was an iron full-rigged ship built in 1869 by Robert Duncan & Co at Port Glasgow. Yard No. 32, her dimensions were 60.24 by 9.82 by 6.07 meters (197.6 ft × 32.2 ft × 19.9 ft) and 901 GRT, 851 NRT and 799 tons under deck.

She was launched on 13 March 1869, built for James Galbraith and partners, Glasgow.

On 27 July 1874 she was sold to Killick Martin & Company, and was initially placed under the command of Captain Evan Lloud. Later that year however the captaincy changed to James Lowe, who remained with her until she was sold by Killick Martin & Company in 1885.

On 19 May 1885 Killick Martin & Company Sold Agnes Muir to E. Tobias in Germany and she was renamed Adele.

She was subsequently sold in 1899 to Lübken, Elsfleth, and again in 1993 to Aktieselskabet Adele (E.M. Olsen), Tønsberg, Norway.
