= Wangsa Maju (disambiguation) =

Wangsa Maju is a township and a constituency in Kuala Lumpur, Malaysia.

Wangsa Maju may also refer to:

- Wangsa Maju (federal constituency), represented in the Dewan Rakyat
- Wangsa Maju LRT station
