= Kaisow (clipper) =

Scottish composite clipper

History

United Kingdom
- Name: Kaisow
- Owner: Alexander Rodger, Glasgow
- Builder: Robert Steele & Company, Greenock
- Launched: 19 November 1868

United Kingdom
- Owner: Killick Martin & Company, London
- Acquired: 1875

United Kingdom
- Owner: William Bowden Jr
- Acquired: 29 April 1885
- Fate: Lost November 1891

General characteristics
- Class & type: Composite clipper
- Tonnage: 820 GRT
- Length: 193.2 ft (58.9 m)
- Beam: 32 ft (9.8 m)
- Depth: 20.3 ft (6.2 m)

Kaisow, a composite clipper, was built by Robert Steele & Company at Greenock and launched on 19 November 1868.

Robert Steele & Company also built the famous clippers Ariel and Taeping which took part in the great tea race of 1866, and Sir Lancelot, another renown clipper ship.

Kaisow was the 173rd vessel to have been built by the yard. She was 193.2 feet (58.9 m) in length, had a beam of 32 feet (9.8 m), a depth of 20.3 feet (6.2 m) and measured at 820 gross register tons (GRT). The clipper had a demiman Mandarin figurehead.

== Service history ==
=== Alexander Rodger ===
Kaisow was originally owned by Alexander Rodger, Glasgow and commanded by Captain Anderson. She made a voyage from London to Shanghai on 1 December 1869 in 99 days, and in 1870 made a transit back from Foochow with a cargo of tea to Deal in 99 days.

=== Killick Martin & Company ===
Kaisow was bought by Killick Martin & Company, led by Captain James Killick in 1875 and was captained by John Gadd between 1876 and 1885. Kaisow was a sister ship in the Killick Martin fleet to Wylo, the last ship to be built by Robert Steele & Company.

Under Killick Martin ownership Kaisow never made a tea passage from China to the U.K., but did load tea to Cape Town and Port Elizabeth. She also made three Trans-Pacific passages between Shanghai and Victoria between 1877 and 1879, not returning to her home port of London for two years and four months. The times of these transits being equal to any previously recorded. In 1878 she was barque-rigged so she could be manned with a smaller crew.

In 1883 Kaisow passed the eruption of Krakatoa. Second mate on Kaisow was Harry Davis, who went onto be a captain himself, wrote a very graphic account of the experience. He described how Captain John Gadd sailed the ship down the Straits, braced sharp up, how the ship weathered the erupting island and so got into the open water and felt the tail end of a huge tidal wave which tore north up the Straits, overwhelming the two sides, wiping out the town of Anjur and killing some 30,000 people.

=== William Bowden Jr and fate ===
On 29 April 1885 Kaisow was sold to William Bowden Jr of Llanelly, Carmarthenshire.

Between 1885 and 1891 Kaisow made several journeys between Liverpool, Valparaiso and Coquimbo with cargoes of manganese ore. On 15 November 1891 the clipper foundered 60 miles (97 km) west southwest of Valparaiso on a voyage from Coquimbo after cargoes had shifted aboard the vessel.

=== Wreck report ===
A transcription of a Board of Trade Wreck Report for Kaisow in 1891 reads as follows: (No. 4447.) "KAISOW." Finding of a Naval Court of Inquiry held at Valparaiso on the 26th and 27th days of November 1891. "The Court, pursuant to an order from Her Britannic Majesty's Consul-General at Valparaiso, proceeded to investigate the cause and manner of the abandonment at sea of the British barque Kaisow of London, official No. 60,392, and having deliberately weighed and considered the evidence and observations preferred by the master, officers, and crew of the vessel, The Court finds:- That the Kaisow, a composite barque of 795 tons register (re-classed in 1887 for 13 years, A 1 Lloyd's, London), sailed from Valparaiso at 5 p.m. on the 14th day of the present month of November, with a cargo of about 1,170 tons of manganese ore, bound for the United Kingdom, and was abandoned at sea at about 60 miles west-south-west of Valparaiso, in a sinking and unmanageable condition at 5 a.m. on the 15th instant. That from the evidence adduced, the Court is of opinion that the vessel was in a thorough seaworthy condition at the time of her departure from this port, and that the cargo was stowed in the proper and customary manner. That at 2 a.m. on the 15th instant, the ship, being under topsails and foresail, was struck by a heavy sea, which hove the vessel on her beam ends, and which must have caused the cargo to shift to starboard. That efforts were made to righten the vessel by putting her before the wind, but without success. That as the ship was rapidly filling with water, the master and crew were constrained to take to the lifeboat and abandon the vessel; that the vessel disappeared shortly after. That there were no deaths. That the master and crew succeeded in reaching land a few miles south of the River Limari on the 16th instant, whence they proceeded to Tongoi on the following day, arriving there at noon on the 18th. Further, the Court is of opinion that the master did all in his power to save the vessel, and that he was justified in abandoning her when he did. Therefore, the Court has pleasure in returning to Mr. William Davies, the master, his certificate, and doth recommend that Mr. Arthur Woodley, the mate, be supplied with duplicates of his certificates which were lost with the vessel."

== Kaisow artwork ==
The renown maritime artists Montague Dawson and Barry Mason have painted Kaisow, and images of her are still being produced today.
