= James Killick =

British sea captain (1816–1889)

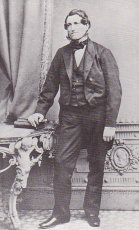
- Born: 26 August 1816; Cheam, United Kingdom
- Died: 29 October 1889 (aged 73); Margate, United Kingdom
- Occupation(s): Captain, shipowner

James Killick (26 August 1816 – 29 October 1889) was a British sea captain, shipowner and entrepreneur. He founded Killick Martin & Company with James Henry Martin.

== Biography ==
Killick was born on 26 August 1816, in Cheam. His family had lived in Cheam since 1741 when John Killick obtained a lease for the house Whitehall, in Cheam.

=== Seafaring career ===
The ships in which Killick served between 1837 and 1840 are unknown, but he is recorded by the Canton Press as being in command of the barque Arun in Canton during December 1841. The ship was built in Littlehampton, England in 1840, so it is most likely that he had been appointed Master for her outward journey during 1841.

On 7 May 1845, Killick is recorded as taking command of John Dugdale built in Whitehaven in 1834. He relinquished his command of the vessel in 1851. During this time Captain James Killick made frequent journeys between China and the UK. Examples are passages during 1848–49 (10 November to 19 March; Woosung to London in 129 days) and 1851 (4 January to 3 May; Shanghai to London in 119 days).

During 1849 Killick obtained his master's certificate from Liverpool Custom's Authorities, and in 1852 he exchanged it under new regulations for a Board of Trade certificate of competency in London.

Killick took command of a new ship, The Challenger, which was launched on 23 December and departed on her maiden voyage on 21 February 1852.

Challenger was built by Richard Green and Henry Green at the Blackwell Yard. She was the 291st ship built by the yard and was a remarkable departure from the previous ships produced. In 1850, the American clipper Oriental visited West India Docks, the largest clipper to visit London, and the Admiralty was given permission to take her lines, which was done by Messrs Waymouth and Cornish, both Lloyd's Surveyors, in the dry dock at Green's Yard in Blackwell. This is probably the reason that it was said that Challenger's design was inspired by and had a close resemblance to the Oriental's. Under Killick's command, Challenger loaded tea at Shanghai on 28 July 1852 and set for London, calling in at Anjer, where she met the American ship, Challenge, which was set for London, with a cargo of tea from Canton. The Challenge was a larger vessel of 2,000 tones, an extreme clipper built expressly for speed and capacity, and was the largest clipper built by the Americans to date. A race to London was commenced by the two vessels, the smaller British clipper arriving in London two days ahead of her larger rival. The news of the British win inspired the efforts of British owners to compete with the Americans and capture the China tea trade.

On 8 August 1853, Killick commenced another race with Challenger against the American clipper Nightingale, from Shanghai. Challenger reached Deal on 26 November, two days earlier than Nightingale.

Under Killick's command, Challenger took an average journey time from Shanghai and Hankou of 115 days. After he relinquished command this extended to an average of 129 days. Captain James Killick's last passage in Challenger ended in December 1860 when she arrived in London with a transit from Shanghai of 108 days.

=== Shipowning career ===
In 1861, Killick, together with James Henry Martin, created a business partnership to own and operate ships called Killick Martin. Killick was the senior partner and his seafaring background gave him the necessary experience to manage the ship owning side of the business. James Martin, twenty years younger than Killick, had previously worked for Phillips, Shaw & Lowther, which later changed its name to Shaw, Lowther and Maxton (owners of famous clipper ships like Ariel and Titania) concentrated on the running of the office and securing of cargo.

In 1863, the company name was changed to Killick Martin & Company when David William Richie became a partner. The company was later incorporated in 1953 to become Killick Martin & Company Ltd.

Between 1862 and 1879, Killick Martin and Killick Martin & Company owned 20 clipper ships, including Challenger which they acquired in 1865, which was the ship Captained by James Killick himself in the tea races against the American ships Challenge and Nightingale. Other famous ships owned by Killick Martin included, Lothair, Kaisow, which was painted by Montague Dawson and Wylo, painted by James Brereton.

== Death and legacy ==
Basil Lubbock and David MacGregor, in their various publications, mention in his later life Killick was nicknamed 'China Bird' and 'Admiral', and when he died on 29 October 1889, aged 73, in Margate, some of his obituaries referred to these nicknames and show the high regard and respect which his friends and colleagues held for him.

Sutton Cultural Services, part of Sutton Council, have an archive on Killick and regularly hold free to enter exhibitions on his life at his former family home in Whitehall, Cheam, Surrey. Whitehall which is English Natural Heritage listed was also restored by Sutton Council in 2018 with the aid of a £1.9 million grant from the National Lottery.

Killick Martin's House Flag is held within the National Maritime Museum, and a builder's model of Lothair in the Hong Kong Museum of History.
