= Fries Scheepvaart Museum =

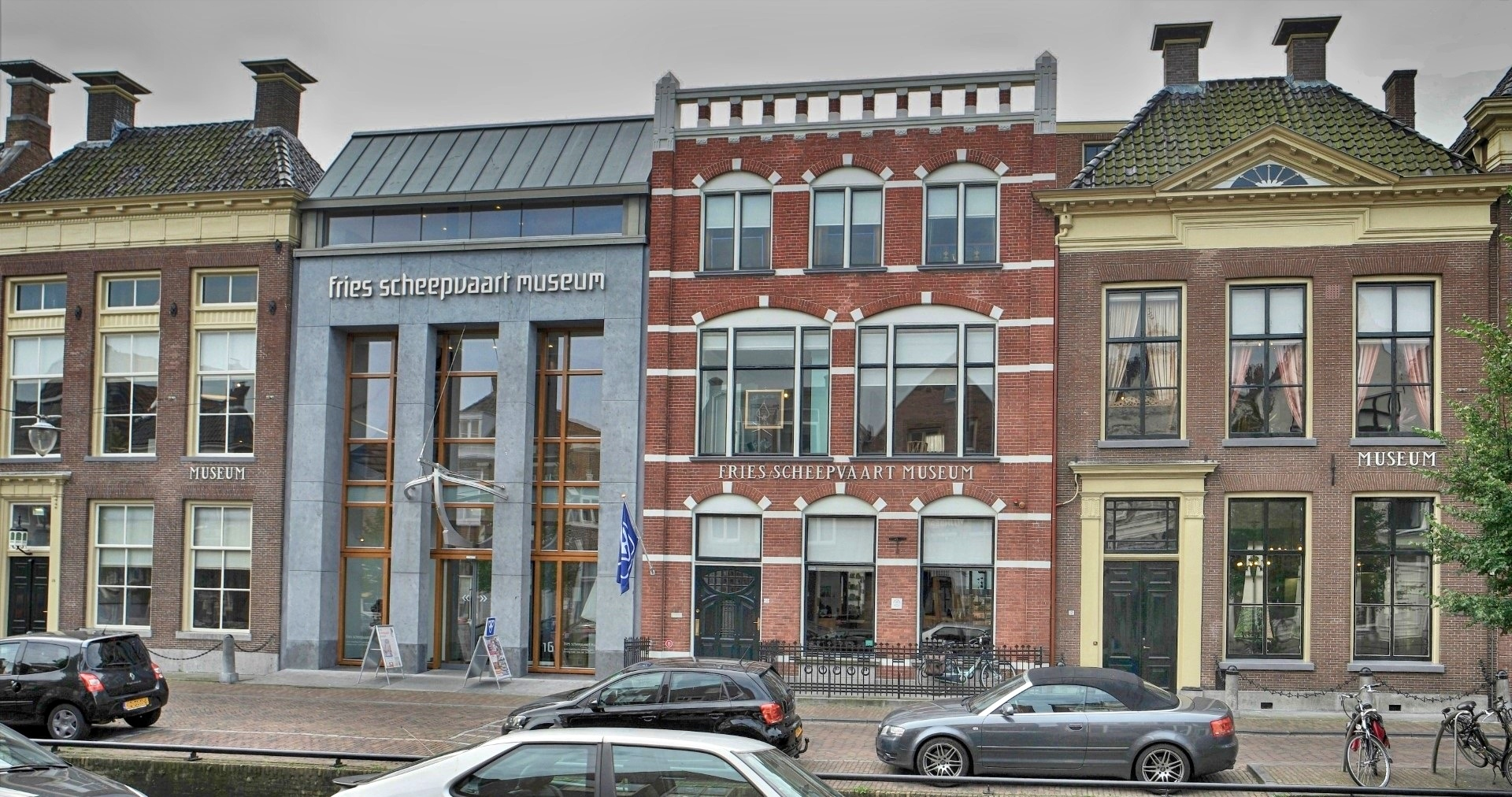
- The Fries Scheepvaart Museum in 2017
- Established: 1938
- Location: Kleinzand 12-22, Sneek, Netherlands
- Coordinates: 53.0323°N 5.6631°E
- Type: museum
- Website: www.friesscheepvaartmuseum.nl

The Fries Scheepvaart Museum (English: Frisian Ship Transport Museum) is a maritime museum in the Kleinzand area of Sneek, Netherlands. Located in the province of Friesland, it contains a library, film viewing room, and focuses on local seafaring life. It is housed in canal buildings dated to 1844 and offers collections of old sailing ships models, naval paintings, and silver pieces. The museum was founded in 1938 by Johannes (1888-1958) and Herre (1920-1998) Halbertsma.

== Collection ==
- The museum includes items of female speed skaters: Jikke Gaastra, Sjoukje Bouma and Geesje Woudstra.
- The museum includes work of painter and draftsman Douwe de Hoop.
- Engraving of Wigerus Vitringa
- Painting Jacobus Deketh
- The Figurehead of Wylo
