= Challenger (clipper) =

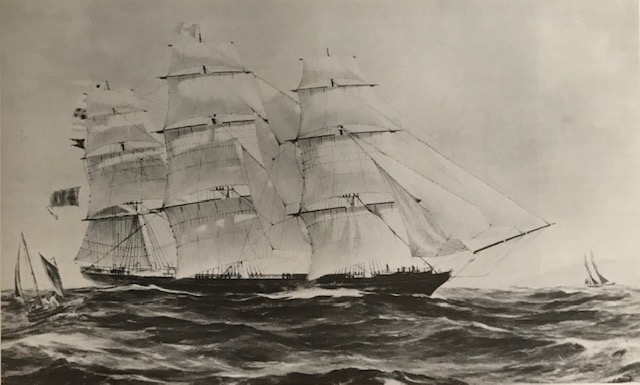
- Challenger

History

United Kingdom
- Name: Challenger
- Owner: Hugh Hamilton Lindsay (1852–1865); Killick Martin & Company (1865–1868); William Stewart (1868); John Grice, Thomas Grice & James Septimus Grice (1868–1871); Unknown (1871)
- Builder: Richard & Henry Green, Blackwall Yard
- Launched: 23 December 1852
- Fate: Abandoned, 1871

General characteristics
- Class & type: Clipper
- Length: 174 ft (53 m)
- Beam: 32 ft (9.8 m)
- Draught: 20 ft (6.1 m)

Challenger was a wooden clipper ship built in 1852 by Richard & Henry Green, in their Blackwall Yard for Hugh Hamilton Lindsay, London. She was the 291st ship built by the yard and was a remarkable departure from the previous ships produced. In 1850 the American clipper ship Oriental visited West India Docks, the largest clipper ship to visit London and the Admiralty was given permission to take her lines, and this was done by Messrs Waymouth and Cornish, both Lloyd's Surveyors, in the dry dock at Green's Yard in Blackwell. This is probably the reason that it was said that Challenger's design was inspired by and had a close resemblance to the Oriental's.

From The Copartnership Herald, Vol. I, no. 8 (October 1931)

...American ships, which still held the supremacy until soon after Richard Green had declared his decision not to be beaten by them. He had a new tea clipper built at his yard at Blackwall, called the Challenger, of 699 tons, and she was sent off to China, Captained by James Killick in 1852. Having loaded tea at Shanghai, she set out for London, calling in at Anjer, where she met the American ship, Challenge, which was on her way to London with a cargo of tea from Canton. The Challenge was a 2,000 tonner, built expressly for speed and capacity, and was the largest clipper built by the Americans until that time. So it was that a race home was started by these two vessels, the smaller British clipper gaining London two days ahead of her huge rival. Naturally, this set the hearts of all the British owners aglow, and was instrumental in urging on the efforts of our shippers to capture the China trade.

On 8 August 1853 Captain James Killick commenced another race with Challenger against the American clipper Nightingale from Shanghai. Challenger reached Deal on the 26 November, 2 days earlier than Nightingale.

Under Captain James Killick's command Challenger took an average journey time from Shanghai and Hankow of 115 days. After he relinquished command this extended to an average of 129 days.

Between 14 June and 20 October 1863 Challenger sailed from Hankow to London in 128 days with a cargo of tea at £7 10s to £8 per ton.

She measured 174'×32'×20' and tonnage 699 NM, 649,74 GRT & NRT, and 614,07 tons under deck.

She was designed for the China tea trade.

In 1865 Challenger was purchased by Killick Martin & Company and operated by them until 1868. Killick Martin & Company was founded by the former Captain of Challenger James Killick.

In 1868 she was sold to William Stewart, London, but sold four days later to John Grice, Thomas Grice & James Septimus Grice, London.

She was sold again in 1871 and transferred to Melbourne, but abandoned shortly afterward at 48°N, 13°W, southwest of the port of Plymouth, England.

In July 1984 Killick Martin & Company were presented with a painting by artist Hugh Spink of Challenger by Ben Line Agencies to commemorate their 100th Anniversary of representing them as Liner Agents in London.

During the 1980s until 1999, 42 Adler Street in Aldgate was occupied by Challenger's former owners Killick Martin & Company Ltd and the building was named "Challenger House". The building is still there today, retains the name Challenger House and is leased to Qbic, who operate a 171-room hotel at the site.

== Memorial ==
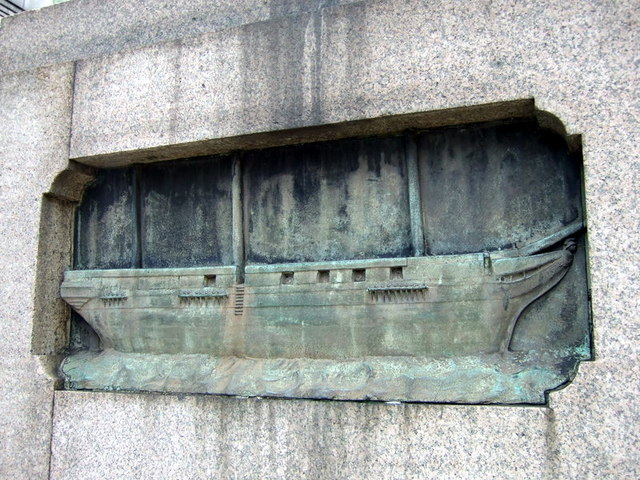
Richard Green's ship, the Challenger

She is commemorated by a bas relief, on the side of the statue of Richard Green. The statue stands outside the Poplar Baths in London, not far from where she was built.
