= Anjur =

Village in Kerala, India

- village
- Location in Kerala, India Anjur (India)
- Coordinates: 10.5992200°N 76.155290°E
- Country: India
- State: Kerala
- District: Thrissur

Area
  - Total: 2.35 km^{2} (0.91 sq mi)

Population (2011)
  - Total: 8,926
  - Density: 3,800/km^{2} (9,840/sq mi)

Languages
  - Official: Malayalam, English
- Time zone: UTC+5:30 (IST)
- PIN: 6XXXXX
- Vehicle registration: KL-

Anjur is a village in Thrissur district in the state of Kerala, India.

== Summary ==
As of 2011 India census, Anjoor had a population of 9152 with 4462 males and 4690 females. Anjoor is a village located 7 km (4 mi) away from Kunnamkulam. Its on the way to Althara from Kunnamkulam. Anjoor has the majority Christian community settlement rest covers Hindus and Muslims. The best landmark is Xavier's church and it is one of the historical symbol. Anjoor had an old age tree which was located in the centre and it was fallen off recently during rainy season. People are co-operative and friendly. This place connects almost all the other major towns.
