= List of clipper ships =

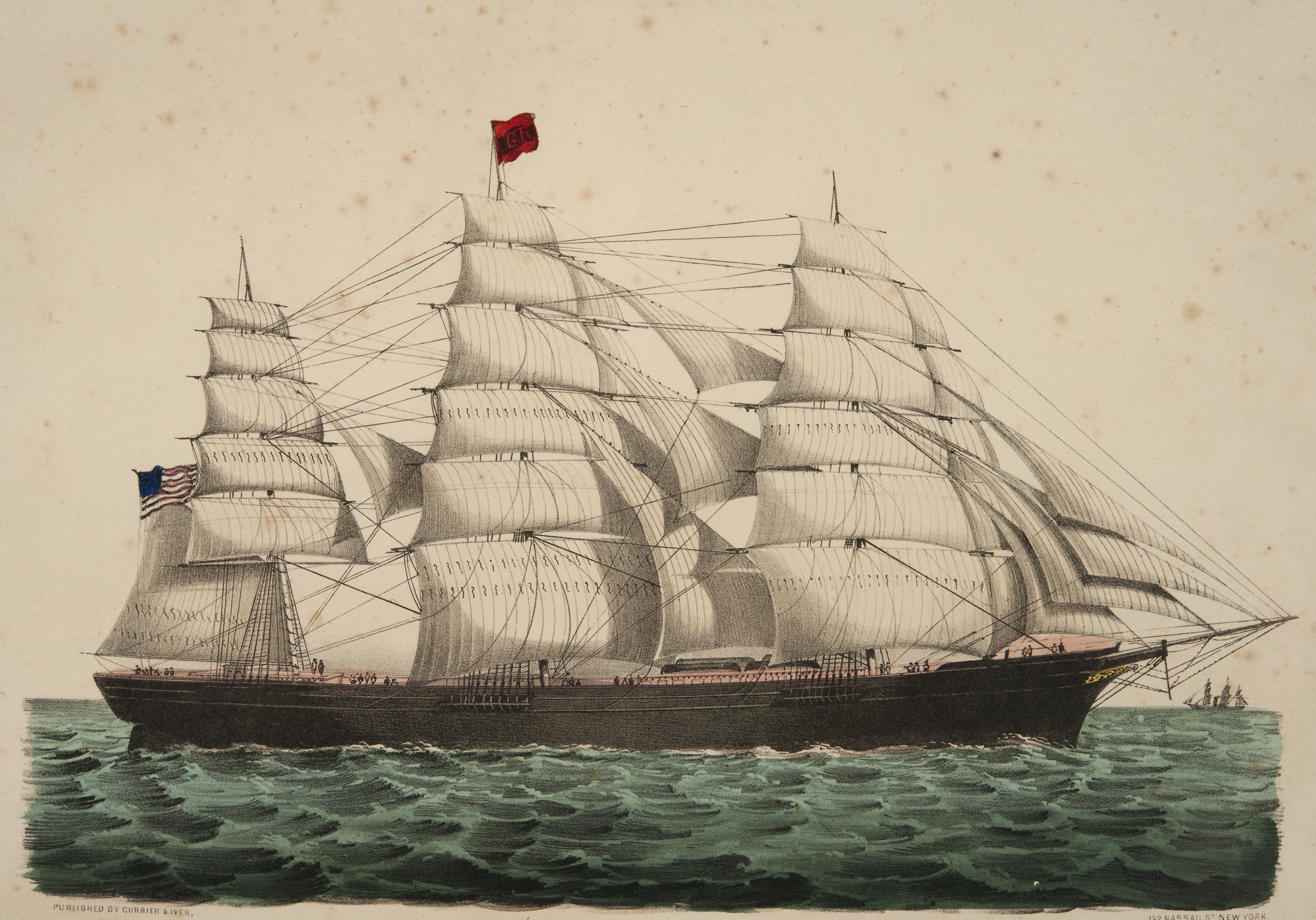
Great Republic (1853), the largest clipper ever built.

The period of clipper ships lasted from the early 1840s to the early 1890s, and over time features such as the hull evolved from wooden to composite. During the 'crest of the clipper wave' year of 1852, 200 clippers rounded Cape Horn. The age of clippers ended when they were phased out in favor of more modern Iron-hulled sailing ships, which eventually gave way to steamships. In the late 20th century, ships based on the 19th century designs of historical ships began to be built. These are used today as training ships and to promote tourism rather than for cargo or trade. The following entries are organized by their year of launch and alphabetically within each year.

== List criteria ==
Among other characteristics which define a clipper is that they were usually ships in the strictest sense of the word. That is, they were three-masted vessels (though rarely four-masted) and were fully square-rigged on all masts. Speedy contemporary vessels with other sail plans, such as barques, were also sometimes called clippers. Likewise, Baltimore clipper is a colloquial term most commonly applied to two-masted schooners and brigantines. The "Baltimore clipper" was actually invented before the appearance of clipper ships. On the other end of the timeline are iron-hulled sailing ships which differ from clipper ships. The only iron-hulled examples present on this list are ones which have been labeled as clippers by reliable sources.

== Historical clipper ships ==
The list is presented first by year of launch and then alphabetically within each year.

=== 1840s ===
Name	Image	Year of launch	Build location	Fate	Length overall	Short summary
Houqua		1844	United States (New York, NY)	Disappeared in 1864	Unknown	Laid down along lines designed by packet captain Nat Palmer of Stonington, Connecticut. Built by Brown & Bell of New York for the China merchants A.A. Low & Bro, she was launched in 1844, named after a Chinese merchant who had died the previous year. Dogged by ill luck during her career, she disappeared at sea after leaving Yokohama in 1864.
Rainbow		1845	United States (New York, NY)	Lost in 1848	159 ft (48 m)	Rainbow was designed by John W. Griffiths and built by Smith & Dimon of New York for China merchants Howland & Aspinwall. Her design was heavily criticized at the time causing construction to be delayed, while rivals Brown & Bell (also New York based) launched the clipper Houqua for China merchants A.A. Low & Bro.
Tartar	—N/a	1845?	United States (New York, NY)	Unknown	—N/a	Tartar was a 573-ton ship built in Philadelphia that set a sailing record of 77 days from Holyhead, Wales, to Bombay, India, in 1845 (April 4—June 19), captained by Benoni Lockwood III.
Sea Witch		1846	United States (New York, NY)	Wrecked in 1856	170.3 ft (51.9 m)	She was built by Smith & DiMonte of New York for owners Howland & Aspinwall. Her 140 ft mainmast carried 5 tiers of sails, as did the shorter fore and mizzen masts. In 1849, she made a record-setting run from Hong Kong to New York in 74 days under Captain Robert "Bully Bob" Waterman. The previous record had also been set by the same captain with the Sea Witch two years prior with a time of 77 days.
Memnon		1848	United States (New York, NY)	Lost in 1851	170 ft (52 m)	
Ticonderoga	—N/a	1849	United States (New York, NY)	Wrecked in 1872	169 ft (52 m)	A 169 ft. 4-masted clipper displacing 1,089 tons, launched at Williamsburg, New York. The Ticonderoga was infamous for her "fever ship" voyage in 1852 from Liverpool to Port Phillip carrying 795 passengers. 100 passengers died during the voyage of what was later determined to have been typhus.

=== 1850s ===
Name	Image	Year of launch	Build location	Fate	Length overall	Short summary
Game Cock		1850	United States (Boston, MA)	Condemned in 1880	200 ft (61 m)	
Mandarin		1850	United States(New York City, NY)		156 ft (48 m)	Built to be the fastest sailing ship, she completed 10 voyages before running aground and being abandoned in the East Indies
Race Horse	—N/a	1850	United States (Boston, MA)	Disappeared in 1865	128 ft (39 m)	She was an 1850 clipper barque, who set a record of 109 days from New York to San Francisco during the first Clipper Race around the Horn.
Sea Serpent		1850	United States (Portsmouth, NH)	Abandoned in 1891	212 ft (65 m)	
Stag Hound		1850	United States (Boston, MA)	Burned in 1861	226 ft (69 m)	Stag Hound was designed by Donald McKay, and built in Boston in anticipation of the California Gold Rush. She was owned Sampson & Tappan (based in Boston), and when completed was the largest vessel in the American merchant marine. Stag Hound was a newer style of clipper which was designed for speed. Under Captain Josiah Richardson, she made a voyage from San Francisco to Canton, China in record time. Her around the world voyages paid for the ship and earned $80,000 for her owners. Her end came in 1861 when she caught fire off Pernambuco, Brazil.
Stornoway		1850	United Kingdom (Aberdeen)	Wrecked in 1873	157.8 ft (48.1 m)	Stornoway was a British tea clipper built in Aberdeen, Scotland in 1850.
Surprise		1850	United States (Boston, MA)	Wrecked in 1876	183.2 ft (55.8 m)	In hull form, Surprise was a medium clipper, with a prismatic coefficient of 0.82 (compared to Witch of the Wave: 0.66; Sea Witch: 0.64 - typical values for a "sharp" clipper). Nevertheless, she made some notably fast passages, setting a record, at the time, of 96 days and 15 hours on her first trip from New York to San Francisco. She sailed extensively to China.
Witchcraft		1850	United States (Chelsea, MA)	Lost in 1861	193 ft (59 m)	A clipper ship built by Paul Curtis and Mr. Taylor, and designed by Samuel Hartt Pook.
Antelope of Boston	—N/a	1851	United States (Medford, MA)	Abandoned in 1858	140 ft (43 m)	
Challenge		1851	United States (New York, NY)	Wrecked in 1876	224 ft (68 m)	Built by William H. Webb in NYC for the San Francisco run, Challenge was captained by Robert Waterman and was expected to beat the extreme clipper Flying Cloud. Brutal treatment of inexperienced crew by Waterman and first mate James Douglass caused riots when San Franciscans heard of the first passage. She was ultimately wrecked off Ushant in 1876.
Comet		1851	United States (New York, NY)	Sank in 1865	241 ft (73 m)	A California clipper built by William H. Webb which sailed in the Australia trade and the tea trade. This extreme clipper was very fast. She had record passages on two different routes: New York City to San Francisco, and Liverpool to Hong Kong, and beat the famous clipper Flying Dutchman in an 1853 race around the Horn to San Francisco.
Eastern State	—N/a	1851	United States (Frankfort, ME)	Sold in 1866 (fate unknown)	159 ft (48 m)	Built by George Dunham, Frankfort, ME. 813 tons. 159'x29'x21.6'. Captain Paron C. Kilburn. Departs New York Feb 13, 1852; arrives San Francisco July 12, 1852. Later China. In Callao, Peru July, 1854. In Hampton Roads, VA October 1854. In New York October 18, 1854. 1866 sold to British.
Flying Cloud		1851	United States (Boston, MA)	Burned in 1875	225 ft (69 m)	The Flying Cloud was built by Donald McKay, and owned by Grinnell, Minturn & Co which was based out of Boston. In 1854, she set a record of 89 days 8 hours for her trip from New York to San Francisco under Captain J. P. Creasy. Flying Cloud had one sister ship named Northern Light, and was a second copy of the new design that produced the fastest clipper ships.
Flying Fish		1851	United States (Boston, MA)	Wrecked in 1858 (Note: The wreck was sold to a Manila merchant, eventually "Flying Fish" was rebuilt at Whampoa, China and renamed El Bueno Suceso.)	196.6 feet (59.9 m)	She was launched at East Boston, Massachusetts, for Messrs. Sampson & Tappan, Boston. Under Captain Edward Tappan, she made a run from New York to San Francisco in 92 days. She wrecked on 23 November 1858 off Fuzhou, China en route to New York with a cargo of tea. The wreck was sold to a Manila merchant. After she was rebuilt at Whampoa, China she was renamed the El Bueno Suceso.
Harriet Hoxie	—N/a	1851	United States (Mystic, CT)	Sold in 1859 fate unknown	140 feet (43 m)	
Hornet		1851	United States (New York, NY)	Burned in 1866	207 ft (63 m)	Built by Westervelt and Mackay in New York, she is notable for a race in 1853 involving Flying Cloud, and eventually burning at sea in 1866. Her crew took to three lifeboats, only one of which eventually reached Hawaii after a voyage of 4300 miles.
Ino	—N/a	1851	United States (New York, NY)	Sold in 1886 (fate unknown)	160.6 ft (49.0 m)	
Marco Polo		1851	Province of Canada (Saint John, NB)	Wrecked in 1884	184.1 ft (56.1 m)	In 1852 she made England-Australia round trip in less than 6 months.
N.B. Palmer		1851	United States (New York, NY)	Abandoned in 1892	202.6 ft (61.8 m)	
Nightingale		1851	United States (Eliot, ME)	Abandoned in 1893	177 ft (54 m)	
North America	—N/a	1851	United States (Boston, MA)	Sold in 1865 fate unknown	195 ft (59 m)	A clipper almost similar in size to The North American, with which she is often misidentified due to the name(see Lloyd's Register of American Shipping 1859 register 1567 and the same Register for the year 1864), she was designed by Donald McKay in the year 1851 and after service in the USA was sold to South America in 1865 and not listed by LLoyd's afterwards.
North American		1851	United States (Damariscotta, ME)	Abandoned in 1898	194 ft (59 m)	Renamed Marianna VI, Philadelphia and finally Redemptora (1888) as a homage to princess Isabel of Brazil who abolished slavery in that year. A clipper ship built by Algernon Austin of Maine she was employed as an immigration ship during the Gold Rush and the American Civil War. Launched in 1851. Dimensions 194'x 38' x 28'. Almost sunk during her voyage from Brazil to Australia in 1888, she arrived badly damaged at Fremantle (WA) and was soon sold and used in the local trade as a coal hulk until abandoned on the shores of Jervoise Bay (WA) in 1898.
Northern Light		1851	United States (Boston, MA)	Abandoned in 1862	180 ft (55 m)	Medium clipper built in Boston and designed by naval architect Samuel Hartt Pook. In 1853, Northern Light set the record from San Francisco around Cape Horn to an east coast port (Boston) of 76 days 5 hours.
Shooting Star		1851	United States (Medford, MA)	Wrecked in 1867	171 ft (52 m)	
Snow Squall		1851	United States (Cape Elizabeth, Maine)	Condemned in 1864	157 ft (48 m)	Snow Squall was a small 800 ton clipper built for the China trade. When she was broken up, the largest surviving piece was used as a dock at Port Stanley in the Falkland Islands. At least 19 feet of her bow was also preserved, and now resides at a museum in Portland, Maine. It is the sole remaining example of the hundreds of American-built clipper ships.
Swordfish	—N/a	1851	United States (New York, NY)	Unknown	169.6 ft (51.7 m)	Swordfish was built by William H Webb, and owned by Barclays & Livingston both of New York. She sailed from New York to San Francisco in 90 days under Captain David S Babcock.
Syren		1851	United States (Medford, MA)	Unknown	189 ft (58 m)	Syren sailed in the San Francisco trade, transporting whaling products from Hawaii and the Arctic to New Bedford, Massachusetts. She had a long documented career that lasted until at least 1920, her ultimate fate is unknown.
White Squall	—N/a	1851	United States	Burned in 1853	200 ft (61 m)	White Squall was an 1100-ton fast clipper sailing in the China trade; she was the last command of captain Benoni Lockwood III and burned in a fire in New York Harbor after only 2 years of service.
Witch of the Wave		1851	United States (Portsmouth, NH)	Broken up in 1886	220 ft (67 m)	Built by George Raynes of Portsmouth (NH), she held the record passage from Calcutta to Boston.
Bald Eagle		1852	United States (Boston, MA)	Lost in 1861	195 ft (59 m)	Built by Donald McKay; set the record of 78 days 22 hours for a fully laden ship from San Francisco to New York.
Carrier Pigeon	—N/a	1852	United States (Bath, ME)	Sank in 1853	175.5 ft (53.5 m)	
Celestial Empire		1852	United States (Boston, MA)	Abandoned in 1878	193 ft (59 m)	
Challenger (1852)		1852	United Kingdom (London)	Abandoned in 1871	174 ft (53 m)	Built by Richard & Henry Green in their Blackwall Yard for Hugh Hamilton Lindsay, London. In 1871 she abandoned at 48°N, 13°W, southwest of the port of Plymouth, England.
Golden South	—N/a	1852	United States (Boston, MA)	Burned in 1893	183.9 ft (56.1 m)	
Golden West		1852	United States (Boston, MA)	Unknown	210 ft (64 m)	
Hippogriffe	—N/a	1852	United States (Dennis, MA)	Unknown	Unknown	678 Tons. Hippogriffe was launched in 1852 from Shiverick Shipyards in East Dennis, MA. It sailed 1,800 miles with a hunk of coral 18 inches in diameter in its hull.
John Gilpin		1852	United States (Boston, MA)	Abandoned in 1858	195 ft (59 m)	She was built by Samuel Hall for owners Pierce, Hunnewell & Company (both Boston). Under Captain Justin Doane, she sailed from New York to San Francisco in 93 days.
National Eagle	—N/a	1852	United States (Medford, MA)	Gone by 1884	179 ft (55 m)	Medium clipper of New York built by Built 1852 in Medford, Mass. By Joshua T. Foster and Co. for Fisher & Co. of Boston – 996 tons, 179’ x 36’ x 24’. In 1854, she sailed from Boston to San Francisco in 134 days. She was driven ashore near Bari, Italy on her voyage to Flume, Austria.
Onward	—N/a	1852	United States (Medford, MA)	Sold in 1884 (fate unknown)	175 ft (53 m)	
Sea Nymph		1852	United States (Fairhaven, MA)	Lost in 1861	—N/a	Sea Nymph was built in Fairhaven, MA and at 1253 tons, was one of the largest ships of her time. She was employed in the New York to San Francisco trade and carried freight as well as passengers. She was ultimately lost in a storm at Point Reyes, California in May, 1861.
Sovereign of the Seas		1852	United States (Boston, MA)	Wrecked in 1859	252 ft (77 m)	Sovereign of the Seas was the fastest and longest ship yet built when she was launched in New York. She was designed and built by Donald Mackay for her owners Funke & Meinke of New York. She sailed from New York to San Francisco on her maiden voyage in 103 days, and achieved the fastest ever recorded speed of a sailing vessel at 22 knots.
Westward Ho!		1852	United States (Boston, MA)	Burned in 1864	220 ft (67 m)	
Belle of the West	—N/a	1853	United States (Dennis, MA)	Unknown	—N/a	Belle of the West was launched in 1853 from Shiverick Shipyards in East Dennis, Massachusetts. Her captain was William F. Howes.
California (1853)		1853	United States (Boston, MA)	Unknown	—N/a	
Challenger (1853)		1853	United States (Boston, MA)	Abandoned in 1875	206 ft (63 m)	
Dreadnought		1853	United States (Newburyport, MA)	Lost in 1869	212 ft (65 m)	Dreadnought was a three-masted medium clipper ship built in 1853 by Currier & Townsend at Newburyport, MA. She was originally intended for the "Racehorse Line" of California clippers, but ended up sailing for the Red Cross Line of New York and Liverpool packets. In 1860 she set a new record for New York to Liverpool of only 9 days, 17 hours. She was ultimately lost in 1869.
Golden State		1853	United States (New York, NY)	Wrecked in 1886	188 ft (57 m)	
Great Republic		1853	United States (New York, NY)	Sunk in 1872	400 ft (120 m)	Designed by Donald MacKay and built in New York for owners A A Low & Brother, she was at 335 feet the largest wooden merchant sailing ship ever built, a record that still stands. Before she made her maiden voyage, however, a fire on shore spread to her dock, and she burned to the waterline. She was rebuilt and relaunched. Under Captain Limeburner, she ran from New York to San Francisco in 92 days.
Herald of the Morning		1853	United States (Medford, MA)	Unlisted in 1891	203 ft (62 m)	
Kingfisher		1853	United States (Medford, MA)	Broken up in 1890	217 ft (66 m)	
Live Yankee	—N/a	1853	United States (Rockland, ME)	Lost in 1861	212 ft (65 m)	Extreme clipper ship built by Horrace Meriam of Rockland Maine.
Lookout		1853	United States (Warren, RI)	Wrecked in 1878	198 ft (60 m)	Built by Chase and Davis for E. Buckley and sons. Wrecked in the Japan Sea after being dismasted in a typhoon, 1878. 198' x38' x 22' 1291 tons.
Lord of the Isles		1853	United Kingdom (Greenock)	Abandoned in 1862	210 ft (64 m)	Iron hulled clipper built by Robert Scott & Co., Greenock. Carried tea from Shanghai to London in 96 days in 1855. Won the tea race 1856. Caught fire 24 July 1862 and was abandoned at sea. 770 tons OM, 691 tons NM.
Mimosa		1853	United Kingdom (Aberdeen)	Lost in 1872	139.9 ft (42.6 m)	Converted to carry Welsh settlers to Patagonia in 1865.
Neptune's Car	—N/a	1853	United States (Portsmouth, VA)	Unknown	—N/a	This extreme clipper ship was built in 1853 by Page & Allen of Portsmouth, Virginia. Dimensions 216'×40'×23'6" and tonnage 1,616 (of cargo carrying volume—old measurement). Launched April 16, 1853 for Foster & Nickerson, New York.
Ocean Chief	—N/a	1853	United States (Thomaston, ME)	Burned in 1862	182 ft (55 m)	
Orient		1853	United Kingdom (London)	Broken up in 1925	184 ft (56 m)	
Queen of Clippers		1853	United States (Boston, MA)		258 ft (79 m)	She was built at East Boston by Robert E. Jackson, the builder of John Bertram and Winged Racer.
Red Jacket		1853	United States (Rockland, ME)	Wrecked in 1885	251 ft (77 m)	Red Jacket was designed by Samuel Hartt Pook, and built by the George Taylor yards of Rockland, Maine. During her maiden voyage from New York to Liverpool under Captain Asa Eldridge, she set an unbroken dock to dock speed record of 13 days, one hour and 25 minutes. She originally sailed the Liverpool to Melbourne run. In 1854 she set another record from Liverpool to Melbourne of 67 days, 13 hours. In 1870 she was sold into the Canadian timber trade, and in 1882 was sent to the Cape Verde Islands, where she expired as a coal hulk.
Romance of the Sea	—N/a	1853	United States (East Boston, MA)	Disappeared in 1863	240 feet (73.2 m)	In her nine-year life, Romance of the Sea made six round-trip voyages between North Atlantic and Pacific Ocean ports before being lost during her seventh voyage.
Sweepstakes		1853	United States (New York, NY)	Scrapped in 1862	216.4 ft (66.0 m)	A clipper built by Westervelt & McKay, and owned by Grinnell, Minturn & Co of Boston. Under Captain George E Lane, she sailed from New York to San Francisco in 94 days. It held the record for the New York-Bombay run.
White Swallow		1853	United States (Boston, MA)	Unknown	—N/a	
Wild Ranger (Note: The Wild Ranger was renamed Ocean Chief in 1862 to act as a replacement after the former ship burned (See "Ocean Chief" entry).)	—N/a	1853	United States (Medford, MA)	Sank in 1872	—N/a	
Young America		1853	United States (New York, NY)	Lost in 1886	243 ft (74 m)	Built by William Webb of New York.
Wide Awake		1853	United States (New York, NY)	In 1857 she was sold at Bangkok and sailed for an unknown period under the Siamese flag.	243 ft (74 m)	Built by Perrine, Patterson & Stack.
Blue Jacket	—N/a	1854	United States (Boston, MA)	Burned in 1869	235 ft (72 m)	She was an extreme clipper in the Liverpool and Australia trades, named after the blue jackets, a traditional name for sailors in the US and British navies.
Champion of the Seas		1854	United States (Boston, MA)	Burned in 1869	202 ft (62 m)	Designed by Donald McKay, holds the speed record of 465 miles in 24 hours, set in 1854.
Commodore Perry	—N/a	1854	United States (Boston, MA)	Wrecked in 1859	252 ft (77 m)	1967 ton extreme clipper ship built in 1854 by Donald McKay, East Boston for Black Ball line of Australia clippers.
Driver	—N/a	1854	United States (Newburyport, MA)	Lost in 1856	—N/a	
Ganges	—N/a	1854	United States (Boston, MA)	Unknown	192 ft (59 m)	The Ganges became known as a "Death Ship" after 52 passengers (almost all children) died of disease and food poisoning during a voyage from Cork, Ireland to Auckland, New Zealand in 1864-65
James Baines		1854	United States (Boston, MA)	Burned in 1858 (Note: James Baines was subsequently rebuilt as a coal barge, her final fate is unknown)	266 ft (81 m)	Launched on 25 July from the East Boston shipyard of the famous ship builder Donald McKay in the US for the Black Ball Line of James Baines & Co., Liverpool. achieved 21 knots speed in 1856. Under Captain C. McConnell, she sailed from Boston to Liverpool in 12 days, 6 hours.
Kosmopoliet	—N/a	1854	Netherlands (Dordrecht)	Unknown	—N/a	Kosmopoliet was built by the shipyard of Cornelis Gips and Sons in Dordrecht. While two other ships followed; Kosmopoliet II (1865) & Kosmopoliet III (1871), little is known about them.
Lightning		1854	United States (Boston, MA)	Scuttled in 1869	277 ft (84 m)	Built by Donald McKay for James Baines of the Black Ball Line, Liverpool, for the Australia trade. Second fastest speed record 436 miles in 24 hours on maiden voyage Boston - Liverpool, and third fastest record of 430 miles in 24 hrs going to Australia.
Mary Robinson		1854	United States (Bath, ME)	Sank in 1864	215 ft (66 m)	
Ocean Telegraph (Note: Ocean Telegraph is also known by the name Light Brigade.)		1854	United States (Medford, MA)	Sold in 1883 (Last reported in 1891)	227 ft (69 m)	Renamed Light Brigade 1863. A clipper ship built for Reed, Wade & Co., Boston for the New York to San Francisco run. Built by James O. Curtis, Medford, Massachusetts, to the design of Boston-based naval architect Samuel Hartt Pook. Launched 29 March 1854. Dimensions 227' × 40' × 23' and tonnage 1495 tons Old Measurement. A very sharp clipper said to be one of the most perfect ships ever built as no expense was spared to make her so.
Robin Hood (1854)		1854	United States (Medford, MA)	Unknown	Unknown	Built in 1854 for Howes & Crowell of Boston, by Hayden & Cudworth of Medford.
Santa Claus		1854	United States (Boston, MA)	Sank in 1863	194 ft (59 m)	Built by Donald McKay for Joseph Nickerson & Co.
Stag	—N/a	1854	Province of Canada (LaHave, NS)	Sank in 1863	103.8 ft (31.6 m)	Built in LaHave, Nova Scotia, known for her dramatic Aberdeen bow and fast Atlantic passages.
Starlight		1854	United States (Boston, MA)	Unknown	190 ft (58 m)	
Sunny South		1854	United States (New York, NY)	Wrecked in 1861	135.4 ft (41.3 m)	She was an extreme clipper and only full-sized sailing ship built by George Steers. Initially, she sailed in the California and Brazil trades. Sold in 1859 and renamed Emanuela, she was considered to be the fastest slaver sailing out of Havana. The British Royal Navy captured Emanuela off the coast of Africa in 1860 with over 800 slaves aboard.
Tayleur		1854	United Kingdom (Liverpool)	Wrecked in 1854	230 ft (70 m)	Designed by William Rennie of Liverpool and built for owners Charles Moore & Company.
Abbott Lawrence		1855	United States (Boston, MA)	Unknown	202.5 ft (61.7 m)	The medium clipper Abbott Lawrence, 1498 tons, was designed by Donald McKay. Her first owners were George B. Upton, John M. Forbes, and Eben Caldwell. Her first captain was Benjamin Hale.
Andrew Jackson		1855	United States (Mystic, CT)	Wrecked in 1868	220 ft (67 m)	Built by Irons & Grinnell of Mystic, CT and owned by J.H. Brower of New York. Under Captain J. E. Williams, it was one of only two clipper ships to complete the New York-San Francisco Cape Horn run in 89 days.
Carrier Dove		1855	United States (Baltimore, MD)	Wrecked in 1876	220 ft (67 m)	
Donald McKay		1855	—N/a	Broken up in 1888	266 ft (81 m)	Named after her designer. Extreme clipper, 2594 tons OM, 266 ft, built for James Baines & Co., last extreme clipper ship built by Donald McKay.
Golden Fleece		1855	United States (Boston, MA)	Wrecked in 1877	222 ft (68 m)	
Mary Whitridge	—N/a	1855	United States (Baltimore, MD)	Unknown	168 ft (51 m)	Built in Baltimore, owned by Thomas Whitridge & Co. She was commanded by Captain Robert B. Cheesborough of Baltimore. She measured at 877 tons, with length of 168 feet, breadth 34 feet, depth 21 feet. On her maiden voyage Mary Whitridge sailed from Cape Charles, Virginia to Liverpool in just 13 days 7 hours. For many years she sailed under Captain Benjamin F. Cutler in the China trade. Clark writes that she was regarded "the finest and fastest ship sailing out of Baltimore" at that time.
Royal Charter		1855	United Kingdom (Deeside)	Wrecked in 1859	236 ft (72 m)	
Schomberg		1855	United Kingdom (Aberdeen)	Wrecked in 1855	—N/a	
Thatcher Magoun		1855	United States (Medford, MA)	Lost in 1884	200 ft (61 m)	an extreme clipper launched in 1855, was named after the father of ship building on the Mystic, Thatcher Magoun, who died the year that she was launched.
Titan		1855	United States	Abandoned in 1858	Unknown	She was built in 1855 by Roosevelt & Joyce at New York, and was owned by D. G. & W. Bacon of Boston. She was commanded at different times by Captain Oliver Eldridge and J. Henry Sears, both of Boston. Her maiden voyage was a charter carrying French troops to the Crimea. In 1857 she carried 6,900 bales of cotton from New Orleans to Liverpool, the largest cargo of cotton ever shipped up to that date by a sailing vessel. The London Times said of her in 1857, "Titan, the largest and finest clipper in the world, has just returned from the Crimea, and will run in the White Star Line to Australia." Subsequently, she sailed to Melbourne and back. In 1857 a gale off Liverpool forced her to cut away the main and mizzen masts in order to wear, and thus she made her way into Liverpool. The next year she was abandoned at sea.
Wild Hunter	—N/a	1855	United States (Dennis, MA)	Unknown	Unknown	
King Philip		1856	United States (Alna, ME)	Wrecked in 1878	182 ft (55 m)	
Lammermuir		1856	United Kingdom (Sunderland)	Wrecked in 1863	178 ft (54 m)	Built by William Pile of Sunderland for John "Jock" "White Hat" Willis & Son - probably his first clipper. Wrecked on the Amherst Reef in the Macclesfield Channel, Gaspar Strait on 31 December 1863. 178' x 34' x 22', 953 NRT.
Robin Hood		1856	United Kingdom (Aberdeen)	Sank in 1864	204 ft (62 m)	A fast, fine-lined tea clipper. Fastest run back from China was 99 days from Fuzhou (Foochow) to London in 1858 during the Southwest Monsoon.
Duncan Dunbar		1857	United Kingdom (Sunderland)	Wrecked in 1865	260 ft (79 m)	
Newcastle		1857	United Kingdom (Sunderland)	Wrecked in 1883	Unknown	
Windsor Castle		1857	United Kingdom (Sunderland)	Wrecked in 1884	195.5 ft (59.6 m)	
Ellen Rodger		1858	United Kingdom (Greenock)	Wrecked in 1886 in the Gaspar Strait.	155.66 ft (47.45 m)	A fullrigged wooden clipper built in 1858 by Robert Steele & Co., Greenock.
Scawfell	—N/a	1858	United Kingdom (Workington)	Abandoned in 1883	198 ft (60 m)	Built of wood, strengthened by iron braces, by Charles Lamport of Workington, Cumberland. In 1861 she made the record voyage under Captain Robert Thomson of 88 days from Whampoa to Liverpool (85 days pilot to pilot).

=== 1860s ===
Name	Image	Year of launch	Build location	Fate	Length overall	Short summary
Fiery Cross		1860	United Kingdom (Liverpool)	Unknown	185.0 ft (56.4 m)	First tea clipper home in 1861,1862, 1863 and 1865. Last cargo of tea carried in 1872/73 season. Entered general trade, with the rig reduced, at some point, to barque for economy (as shown in image).
Flying Spur	—N/a	1860	United Kingdom (Aberdeen)	Wrecked in 1881	184 ft (56 m)	
Great Australia	—N/a	1860	United Kingdom (Liverpool)	Unknown	Unknown	
Queen Of Nations		1861	United Kingdom (Aberdeen)	Wrecked in 1881	Unknown	
The Murray		1861	United Kingdom (Aberdeen)	Unknown	193.7 ft (59.0 m)	
Cornwallis	—N/a	1862	Unknown	Unknown	Unknown	
Coonatto		1863	United Kingdom (London)	Wrecked in 1876	200 ft (61 m)	
Cremorne		1863	United States (Mystic, CT)	Lost in 1870	200 ft (61 m)	Delivered Central Pacific locomotive CP11 to San Francisco, 1865. Left San Francisco for Liverpool, June 1, 1870, and disappeared.
Serica	—N/a	1863	United Kingdom (Greenock)	Wrecked in 1872	185.9 ft (56.7 m)	The penultimate wooden-built clipper before Robert Steele's yard changed to composite construction, Serica was the first tea clipper home in 1864 and only beaten by Fiery Cross in 1865 because no tug was available.
Three Brothers (clipper)		1862	United States (New York, NY)	Scrapped in 1899	331.0 ft (100.9 m)	Starboard-side view of three-masted sailing ship, US flag at stern; workers and equipment on deck. Was the USS Vanderbilt before it was sold in 1873 to Howe & Brothers of San Francisco.
Taeping		1863	United Kingdom (Greenock)	Wrecked in 1871	183.7 ft (56.0 m)	The first composite tea clipper built by Robert Steele, Taeping won the 1866 tea race by the closest margin over Ariel. First home in 1867, overtaking Serica who had left 2 days earlier.
Wild Deer		1863	United Kingdom (Glasgow)	Wrecked in 1883	Unknown	China tea clipper of 1016 tons, built in 1863 for the Albion Shipping Co. In 1871 she was chartered by the New Zealand Shipping Co., and diverted to transport immigrants to New Zealand. She made ten voyages to Port Chalmers before being wrecked off Cloughey, County Down, on a trip from Glasgow to Port Chalmers in 1883.
City of Adelaide		1864	United Kingdom (Sunderland)	Awaiting restoration	244.1 ft (74.4 m)	
Golden Spur	—N/a	1864	United Kingdom (Guernsey)	Lost in 1879	Unknown	
Lammermuir	—N/a	1864	United Kingdom (London)	Lost in 1876	200 ft (61 m)	Built by William Pile of Sunderland for John "Jock" "White Hat" Willis & Son.
Ariel		1865	United Kingdom (Greenock)	Lost in 1872	197.4 ft (60.2 m)	Of composite construction and with lines for good results in light winds, was second tea clipper home in 1866 in an extremely close finish determined by the height of tide to allow entry to her dock. Always thought of as a particularly fast ship. Presumed lost in 1872 due to being pooped by a following sea - her lack of buoyancy aft meant that she was always at risk of this.
Fusi Yama	—N/a	1865	United Kingdom (Glasgow)	Sank in 1870	165.5 ft (50.4 m)	
John R. Worcester	—N/a	1865	United Kingdom (Glasgow)	Unknown	191.5 ft (58.4 m)	
Seminole	—N/a	1865	United States (Mystic, CT)	Unknown	Unknown	
Sir Lancelot		1865	United Kingdom (Greenock)	Lost in 1895	197.6 ft (60.2 m)	
Taitsing		1865	United Kingdom (Glasgow)	Sank in 1883	192.0 ft (58.5 m)	
Yatala		1865	United Kingdom (Aberdeen)	Wrecked in 1872	215 ft (66 m)	
Sobraon		1866	United Kingdom (Aberdeen)	Broken up in 1941	317 ft (97 m) (Note: This may or may not reflect Sobraon's final form, as she was converted from a clipper into a training ship.)	
Titania		1866	United Kingdom (Greenock)	Broken up in 1910	200 ft (61 m)	She was a composite tea clipper built by Robert Steele & Co., Greenock and commanded by Captain Robert "Bobby" Deas, former master of Ganges, in the 1867 tea race. Ariel was her sister ship.
Lahloo		1867	United Kingdom (Greenock)	Lost in 1872	191.6 ft (58.4 m)	
Leander		1867	United Kingdom (Glasgow)	Broken up in 1901	215.5 ft (65.7 m)	
Kaisow		1868	United Kingdom (Greenock)	Lost in 1891	193.2 ft (58.9 m)	
South Australian		1868	United Kingdom (Sunderland)	Lost in 1889	201 ft (61 m)	
Thermopylae		1868	United Kingdom (Aberdeen)	Scuttled in 1907	212 ft (65 m)	An extreme composite clipper ship built by Walter Hood & Co of Aberdeen to the design of Bernard Waymouth of London for the White Star Line of Aberdeen.
Windhover	—N/a	1868	United Kingdom (Glasgow)	Wrecked in 1889	201.1 ft (61.3 m)	
Ambassador		1869	United Kingdom (London)	Abandoned in 1895	176 ft (54 m)	
Cutty Sark		1869	United Kingdom (Dumbarton)	Museum ship (Greenwich, UK)	280 ft (85 m)	
Glory of the Seas	—N/a	1869	United States (East Boston, MA)	Scrapped in 1923	250 feet (76.2 m)	The last merchant sailing vessel built by Donald McKay
Miako	—N/a	1869	United Kingdom (Sunderland)	Unlisted in 1912	160.1 ft (48.8 m)	
Norman Court		1869	United Kingdom (Glasgow)	Sank in 1883	197.4 ft (60.2 m)	
Osaka		1869	United Kingdom (Sunderland)	Wrecked in 1904	195 ft (59 m)	
Wylo		1869	United Kingdom (Greenock)	Broken up in 1886	192.9 ft (58.8 m)	

=== 1870s - 1890s ===
Name	Image	Year of launch	Build location	Fate	Length overall	Short summary
Blackadder		1870	United Kingdom (Greenwich)	Wrecked in 1905	216.6 ft (66.0 m)	Blackadder was built by Maudsley, Sons & Field at Greenwich for John Willis. She was the sister ship of Hallowe'en (see entry below). She was wrecked on November 5, 1908, whilst on passage from Barry to Bahia loaded with coal.
Hallowe’en		1870	United Kingdom (Greenwich)	Wrecked in 1887	216.6 ft (66.0 m)	Built by Maudsley, Sons & Field at Greenwich for John Willis, she was the sister ship to Blackadder. Due to faults in her sister ship which caused dismasting on her maiden voyage, Hallowe'en was not handed over to Willis for nearly 18 months after her launch due to protracted legal action. Hallowe'en was fast in light airs and recorded many fast passages from China. In 1887 she was on passage from Fuzhou (Foochow) loaded with tea and was wrecked off Salcombe in the United Kingdom.
Lothair		1870	United Kingdom (London)	Lost in 1910	191.8 ft (58.5 m)	Lothair was one of the fastest tea clippers built. On her maiden voyage under Captain Emlyn Peacock, departing London on 10 September 1870, she reached Yokohama in 135 days. She was later acquired by Killick Martin & Company in 1873, and then by William Bowen in 1885. She was ultimately lost in 1910 for unknown reasons.
Loch Ard		1873	United Kingdom (Scotstoun)	Wrecked in 1878	263 ft (80 m)	Built for the Loch Line, she was one of the last clippers built. Her trading route spanned from Great Britain and Australia, but ended when she ran aground on a reef on June 1, 1878.
Rodney		1874	United Kingdom (London)	Wrecked in 1901	235.6 ft (71.8 m)	Rodney was an iron-hulled clipper built for the Australian immigration trade. In 1882, she tied a record set by Patriarch (in 1870) by sailing from The Lizard to Sydney in 67 days. She was eventually sold to a new owner in Nantes, and wrecked on the coast of Cornwall in 1901.
Loch Vennachar		1875	United Kingdom (Glasgow)	Wrecked in 1905	250 ft (76 m)	Wool trade Australia-UK; survived being dismasted by a cyclone in the Indian Ocean,1892; 1901 sunk when a steamship ran her down when at anchor in the Thames Estuary; raised, repaired and returned to service. In 1905 she sank again off Kangaroo Island
Torrens		1875	United Kingdom (Sunderland)	Broken up in 1910	222 ft (68 m)	Built in Sunderland and designed to carry passengers and cargo between London and Port Adelaide, South Australia. She was the fastest ship to sail on that route. Torrens is the last full-rigged composite passenger clipper ever built. She is also the last sailing ship on which Joseph Conrad would serve before embarking on his writing career.
Hereward		1877	United Kingdom (Glasgow)	Wrecked in 1898	254 ft (77 m)	Forced aground by a storm at Maroubra Beach, Sydney, 5 May 1898. All 25 crew members got ashore safely. Salvage attempts failed.
Florence		1877	United States (Maine)	Foundered 1902	225 ft (69 m)	Built in Bath, Maine to transport goods between California and the Eastern US Coast. She disappeared off Cape Flattery during a storm in 1902 and was believed to have sunk.
Cimba		1878	United Kingdom (Aberdeen)	Wrecked in 1915	223 ft (68 m)	Cimba sailed in the wool trade between London and Sydney for 20 years, from 1878 to 1898. Under her Norwegian owners, Cimba's chief cargo was lumber. She carried firewood from the Baltic to East Indian Dock in Aberdeen Bay, and made a fast passage from Dublin to the St. Lawrence of 14 days.
Cromdale		1891	United Kingdom (Glasgow)	Wrecked in 1913	271 feet (83 m)	Cromdale was the last clipper to be built for the Australian wool trade before it became unprofitable by sail. By the time of her launch, larger vessels such as ocean liners were being built that did not require frequent stops for refueling.

== Modern clipper ships ==
The following clipper ships were built in the late 20th and early 21st centuries, they were inspired by the historical Clipper era which peaked in the 1850s.

Name	Image	Year of launch	Build location	Status	LOA	Short summary
Cisne Branco		1999	Netherlands (South Holland)	Active	249 ft (76 m)	Cisne Branco is a steel-hulled full-rigged ship that was built in the style of a classic clipper. She is used as a training ship for the Brazilian Navy.
Stad Amsterdam		2000	Netherlands (South Holland)	Active (Note: Stad Amsterdam was modeled after the mid-19th century frigate Amsterdam, but is not a replica due to her hull)	250 ft (76 m)	Stad Amsterdam is a unique modern "extreme" clipper that was intended to be a replica of the mid-19th century frigate Amsterdam. She ended up not being built as a reproduction, and sails as a passenger clipper ship.
Shabab Oman II		2013	Romania (Galați)	Active	285 ft (87 m)	Shabab Oman II was built in Romania for the Royal Navy of Oman as a training vessel. She is designed as a clipper ship with a sailing speed of 17 knots.

== See also ==
- ARM Cuauhtémoc (Mexico)
- Clipper
- Extreme clipper
- Ocean liner
- Bibliography of early American naval history
- Bibliography of 18th-19th century Royal Naval history
- Tall Ships' Races
