= Syren (clipper) =

1851 clipper ship in United States

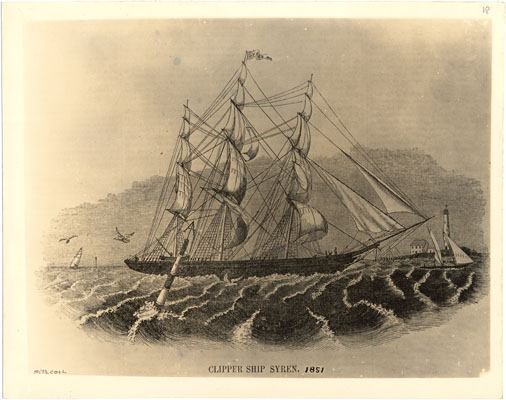
- Syren

History

United States
- Name: Syren
- Owner: Silsbee, Pickman and associates, Salem, MA
- Builder: John Taylor, Medford, MA
- Launched: May 1, 1851
- Acquired: Joseph Hunnewell, Boston, late 1850s. Sold to Charles Brewer, Honolulu a few years later. Last 8 or 9 years of US career, William H. Besse, New Bedford.
- Fate: Put into Rio de Janeiro, leaking badly, June 25, 1888 Condemned and sold to Argentina

Argentina
- Name: Margarida
- Owner: J. Hurley, Buenos Aires
- Reinstated: Repaired and re-rigged as barque.
- Fate: Last registered in Lloyds in 1920 Fate unknown

General characteristics
- Class & type: Medium clipper
- Tons burthen: 1064 tons
- Length: 189 ft. LOA
- Beam: 36 ft.
- Draft: 22 ft.
- Sail plan: Full-rigged ship, re-rigged as barque
- Notes: 2 decks

Syren was the longest lived of all the clipper ships, with a sailing life of 68 years and 7 months. She sailed in the San Francisco trade, in the Far East, and transported whaling products from Hawaii and the Arctic to New Bedford.

== San Francisco trade and transport of whaling products ==
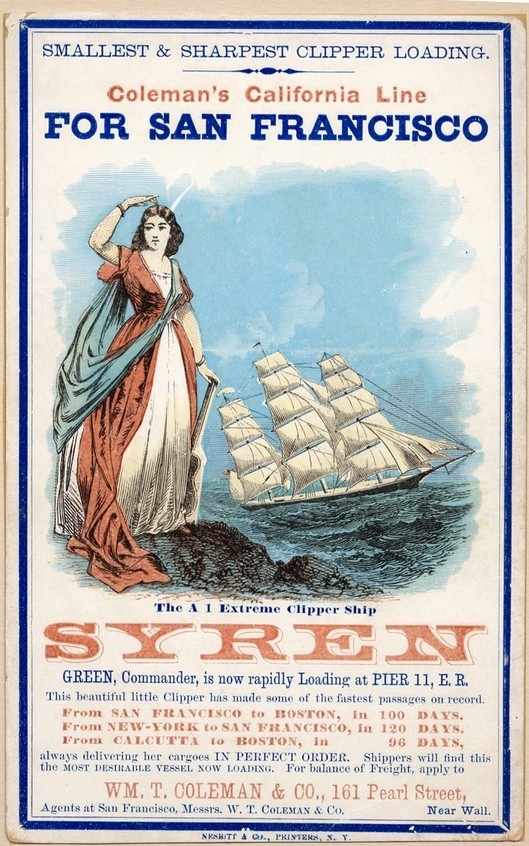
Sailing card

Syren sailed in the San Francisco trade from Boston and New York City from 1851 to 1856, making five passages. She then made a voyage from Boston and Calcutta, and served in the Boston - Honolulu - New Bedford trade until 1861. She then made four more passages in the San Francisco trade.

In 1866, Syren returned to the Boston - Honolulu - New Bedford run, a route she sailed for ten more years. In 1877, Syren began to voyage to Alaska and the Arctic to transport whale oil and the catch of whalers; she also transported coal to the north, and a load of spars from Seattle to Bath, ME.

In All About Hawaii, written in 1920, there appears the following note about Syren:

Dec. 23, 1858, ship Syren, 1064 tons, Green master, 96 days from Boston via Rio Janeiro, with cargo for this market. Feb. 23, 1860, she is back with another eastern cargo, reporting a trip of 114 days. Was the crack ship of the Brewer line of Boston packets several years. In 1868 she made the run in 105 days, and in 1872 it was 109. She also figured in the San Francisco-China trade later, and was finally condemned at Rio, July, 1888.

== Fast voyage from San Francisco to Boston, 1861 ==
In 1861, Syren made a fast voyage from San Francisco to Boston of 103 days, besting the Kingfisher by 17 days. On this voyage, Syren also bested four other clippers bound for New York: Northern Light and Belle of the Seas, both by three days, and Sierra Nevada and Mary Robinson, both by 4 days.

== Far East voyages and guano trade ==
Other ports of call during Syren's long career included: in the Far East, Manila, Whampoa and Batavia; Baker Island, Liverpool, and London. The stop at Baker Island suggests that she was engaged in the guano trade.

Another fast voyage was an 1857-round trip between Boston and Calcutta, of 99 days to Calcutta and 97 days returning.

However, Syren was not known as a particularly fast ship on the East Coast to San Francisco run, as she seemed to run into more than her share of calms, light winds, and bad weather off Cape Horn. Her times typically ranged from 120 to 152 days.

== Mishaps ==
Syren suffered various mishaps during her long career, but remained in service nonetheless.

On April 25, 1861, Syren was beating out of San Francisco, near the entrance to the Golden Gate, when she struck Mile Rock two times. Syren made it back into the harbor with four feet of water in her hold. She was nearly sinking by the time she was beached on the mud flats. Repairs at Mare Island Navy Yard cost $15,000.

Like many clippers, Syren lost rigging and topgallant masts off Cape Horn and in the South Atlantic, in 1853, 1856, 1858 and 1864.

An unknown vessel collided with Syren on a voyage from Boston to Honolulu on December 18, 1870, near the equator in the Atlantic Ocean, but Syren did not sustain serious damage.

== See also ==
- List of clipper ships
