= Hoxie =

Hoxie may refer to:

== Places ==
United States

- Hoxie, Arkansas, a city in Lawrence County
- Hoxie, Kansas, a city in Sheridan County
  - the Hoxie meteorite landed near Hoxie, Kansas (see meteorite falls)

== Ships ==
- SS Hoxie, American cargo ship built in 1918
- Harriet Hoxie, American clipper ship built in 1851

== Other uses ==
- Hoxie (surname)
- Hoxie House, one of the oldest houses on Cape Cod, Massachusetts
