= Lord of the Isles (disambiguation) =

Lord of the Isles is a Scottish title of nobility.

Lord of the Isles may also refer to:

== Titles ==
- Lord of the Isles (Channel Islands), a former British title of nobility

== Transportation ==
=== Railways ===
- Lord of the Isles, a Great Western Railway Iron Duke Class steam locomotive in use from 1851 to 1884
- Lord of the Isles, a Great Western Railway 3031 Class steam locomotive in use from 1891 to 1915

=== Ships ===
- Lord of the Isles (clipper), 1853 British tea clipper
- MV Lord of the Isles, the Calmac ferry

== Other uses ==
- Lord of the Isles (David Drake), the series of fantasy novels by David Drake
- The Lord of the Isles, a narrative poem by Sir Walter Scott
