= Santa Claus (clipper) =

Clipper ship built in 1854

History
- Owner: Joseph Nickerson & Co. (Boston)
- Builder: Donald McKay
- Launched: September 5, 1854
- Completed: November 1854
- Maiden voyage: November 15, 1854
- In service: November 15, 1854 – August 9, 1863
- Fate: Foundered at sea, August 9, 1863

General characteristics
- Type: Medium clipper
- Tonnage: 1256 OM
- Length: 194 ft (59 m)
- Beam: 38 ft 6 in (11.73 m)
- Depth of hold: 22 ft 11 in (6.99 m)
- Decks: 2
- Sail plan: Ship-rigged

Santa Claus was an American medium clipper ship built in Boston by Donald McKay in 1854. In the course of her career, she made three voyages from the East Coast of the United States to San Francisco, California, the fastest of which was a comparatively swift 128-day passage in the winter of 1857–1858. The ship was mainly engaged in the guano trade and in trade to the Far East. In 1858, she brought Chinese immigrants to California; according to one source, she was also at one time engaged in the coolie trade.

Santa Claus sprang a leak while on a voyage from Peru to Germany in August 1863. She sank off French Guiana after being abandoned by her crew, all of whom made it safely to shore in the ship's boats.

== Construction and design ==
Santa Claus, a full-rigged medium clipper of 1,256 tons burthen, was built in Boston by Donald McKay for the Boston firm of Joseph Nickerson & Co. The ship was launched on September 5, 1854, and completed by November.

Santa Claus was built of oak with copper and iron fastenings. She was 194 feet (59 m) in length, with a beam of 38 feet 6 inches (11.73 m) and hold depth of 22 feet 11 inches (6.99 m). She had two full decks and a half-poop deck. Although a clipper, she was built with cargo capacity in mind. Her lines were considered attractive and she was described by contemporaries as a handsome vessel.

== Service history ==
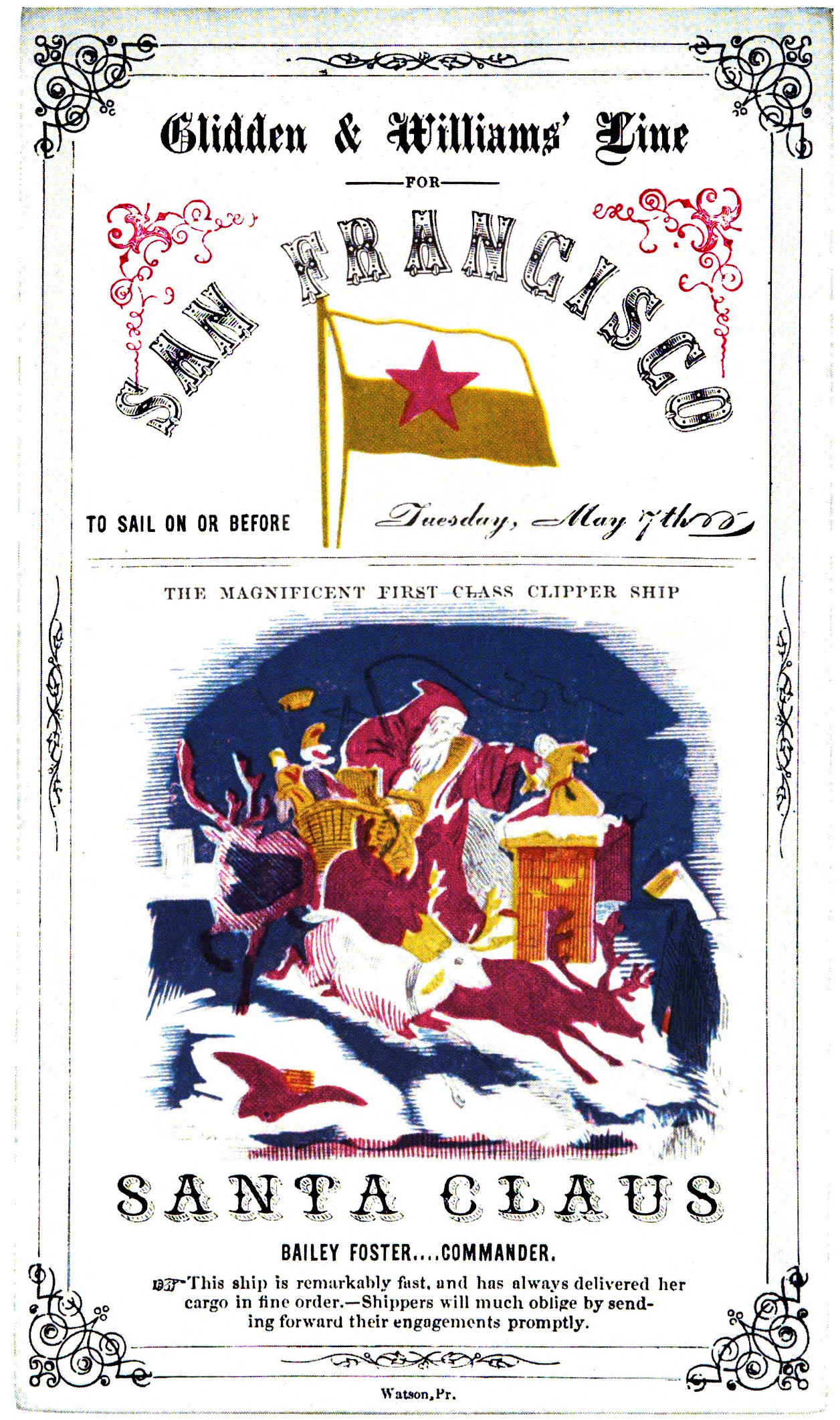
An 1861 sailing card for Santa Claus

Santa Claus departed Boston on her maiden voyage on November 15, 1854, bound for Calcutta, India, returning to Boston on August 15, 1855, after a nine-month round trip. Though considered a fast trip overall, her actual sailing times were unexceptional. Clearing Boston in May 1856, the ship then made a 140-day trip to San Francisco, experiencing light winds throughout the voyage, apart from some heavy weather around Cape Horn, and arrived at her destination September 21. From San Francisco, she traveled to Peru's Chincha Islands for a cargo of guano, which she duly delivered to Hampton Roads, Virginia.

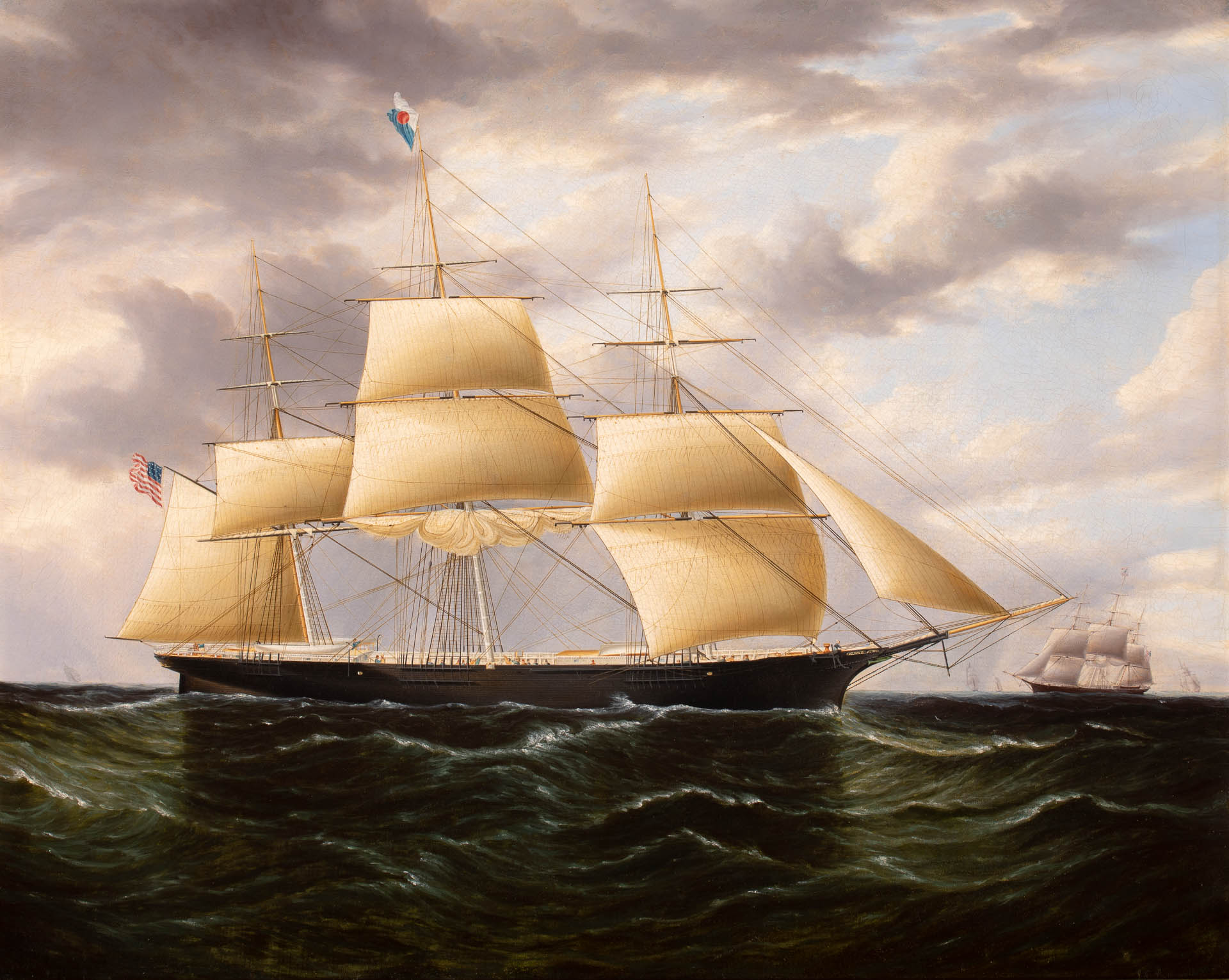
The extreme clipper Flying Fish was the only ship to better Santa Claus's time to San Francisco in the winter of 1857–1858

In October 1855, Santa Claus's captain, Bailey Foster, was arrested on a charge of manslaughter at New Orleans, Louisiana, for having shot and killed a sailor on board the ship while at sea. According to Foster, he had tried to break up a brawl on deck by threatening the crew with a pistol, but the weapon had accidentally discharged. Foster was evidently quickly acquitted as he was to remain in service as the ship's captain.

In 1857–1858, Santa Claus completed her second voyage around Cape Horn to San Francisco, the port of departure on this occasion being New York. Initially making good time to the equator, Santa Claus faced headwinds off Cape São Roque, Brazil, and was driven back across the line, not re-crossing it for another 14 days. She then had good weather around the Horn, but only light winds in the South Pacific. In spite of the challenging conditions, her overall time of 128 days was the second-fastest that winter, bested only by the extreme clipper Flying Fish, with a time of 114 days.

After arriving at San Francisco, Santa Claus made two round voyages between that port and Hong Kong, the first completed in the fast times of 40 days on the outward leg and 41 return, (Note: Cutler lists White Squall as the third-fastest sailing ship on record for the outward leg of this passage with a voyage of 39 days; Santa Claus's trip was only one day longer.) and the second, in 51 and 50 days respectively. On one of these trips, in May 1859, the ship returned to San Francisco with 478 Chinese immigrants. (Note: According to Knoblock, the ship was also engaged at some point in the Chinese coolie trade, though he provides no details.) Santa Claus thereafter made a third trip to Hong Kong, in the time of 48 days, after which she completed an 88-day voyage to Callao, Peru, arriving February 2, 1860. Loading another cargo of guano at Chincha Islands, she delivered it once again to Hampton Roads.

Santa Claus made her third and final voyage around the Horn to San Francisco in 1861, departing from Boston, and arriving at her destination in September. On this occasion, she experienced very heavy weather around the cape and suffered substantial damage, including split sails, damaged bulwarks and broken steering apparatus. About three weeks later, in the Pacific, she ran into a hurricane and lost almost an entire set of sails. In spite of these setbacks, she still managed to complete the voyage in 140 days. The ship then returned to Callao, where she loaded a cargo of guano bound for Brouwershaven, Netherlands, arriving at the latter port on July 21, 1862.

In January 1863, Santa Claus delivered a cargo of coal to the Pacific Mail Steamship Company at Panama; continuing on to Callao, she loaded another cargo of guano at the Chincha Islands, bound for Hamburg, Germany.

Clearing Callao for her destination May 30, Santa Claus reported to a passing ship on July 18 that she was leaking badly but nonetheless expected to make port. On August 9, while attempting to reach Saint Thomas, the ship foundered and was abandoned by her crew, who took to the ship's boats. All hands later safely reached Cayenne, French Guiana.

== See also ==
- Santa Claus – Hudson River steamboat built 1845
