= Cremorne =

Cremorne may refer to:

== Places ==
- Cremorne (barony), County Monaghan, Ireland
- Cremorne (ward), Kensington and Chelsea, England
- Cremorne, New South Wales, Australia
- Cremorne, Tasmania, Australia
- Cremorne, Queensland, Australia
- Cremorne, Victoria, Australia

== Other uses ==
- Baron Cremorne
- Cremorne (clipper), a 1863 clipper ship that sailed between New York and San Francisco
- Cremorne, Hamilton, a heritage-listed villa in Brisbane, Queensland, Australia
- Cremorne (horse), winner of the 1872 Epsom Derby

== See also ==
- The Cremorne, a Victorian pornographic magazine
- Cremorne Gardens (disambiguation), two pleasure gardens in England and Australia in the 19th century
- Crumhorn, a musical instrument also known as a cremorne
