= Romance of the Sea (clipper) =

19th c. American clipper ship

History

United States
- Name: Romance of the Sea (see note) (Note: A contemporary account (McLean) calls the ship Romance of the Sea, and that name is on the original half-hull model. However, since the early 1900s references have called the vessel Romance of the Seas.)
- Owner: George B. Upton
- Builder: Donald McKay of East Boston, MA
- Launched: October 23, 1853
- Fate: Unknown; sailed from Hong Kong December 31, 1862 and was not heard from again

General characteristics
- Class & type: Extreme clipper
- Tons burthen: 1782 tons
- Length: 240 feet (73.2 m)
- Beam: 36.5 feet (11.1 m)
- Draft: 29.5 feet (9.0 m)
- Sail plan: Double topsails; fore and mizzen royals; main skysail

Romance of the Sea was a clipper ship launched in 1853. She was "the last extreme clipper ship built by Donald McKay for the California trade". Her original figurehead was "a small female figure, intended to represent Romance, with the name of [Sir Walter] Scott on one side, and [James Fenimore] Cooper on the other - the greatest romancers of the century". She lost that figurehead during a storm on her third voyage. Some time later it was replaced by "a full-length figure of an ancient navigator, with head bent forward and right hand raised to shade his eyes as he searched for the land beyond the horizon."

In her nine-year life, Romance of the Sea made six round-trip voyages from North Atlantic ports before being lost during her seventh voyage.

== Her voyages ==
The Romance of the Sea's voyages are listed here. Sources disagree on some items; disagreements or ambiguities are individually cited. City names are as they were at the time.

Voyage	Origin	Depart	Destination	Arrive	Days	Captain
1	Boston	December 16, 1853	San Francisco	March 23, 1854	96	Philip Dumaresq
1	San Francisco	March 31, 1854	Hong Kong	May 16, 1854	45	Philip Dumaresq
1	Hong Kong	May 9, 1854	Deal, England or London	September 21, 1854	102 or 103	Philip Dumaresq
2	Deal		Hong Kong		99	William H. Henry
2	Shanghai	November 1, 1855	Deal	March 7, 1856	126	William H. Henry
2	Deal		Boston	August 15, 1856		William H. Henry
3	New York	July 3, 1856	San Francisco	October 24, 1856	113	William H. Henry
3	San Francisco	November 17, 1856	Shanghai	December 22, 1856	113	William H. Henry
3	Shanghai	February 16, 1857	New York	May 27, 1857	100	William H. Henry
4	New York	July 3, 1857	Batavia, Dutch East Indies	September 28, 1857	88	Eben Caldwell
4	See note (Note: Romance spent from late 1857 to early 1859 trading among Hong Kong, Bangkok, and Shanghai.)					Eben Caldwell (see note) (Note: A privately-printed family history, Caldwells & Clipper Ships, states that Captain Caldwell fell ill at Hong Kong and left the ship there.)
4	Shanghai	March 20 or 21, 1859	New York	June 22, 1859	94	
5	New York	August 11, 1859	Hong Kong	December 6, 1859	109	
5	Manila	June 23, 1860	Boston	October 10, 1860	109	
6	Boston	December 28, 1860	San Francisco	April 13, 1861	105	Ashman J. Clough
6	San Francisco	May 12, 1861	Queenstown, Ireland	August 13, 1861	93	Ashman J. Clough
6	Liverpool	September 29, 1861	Boston	October 27, 1861	34	Ashman J. Clough
7	New York	February 7, 1862	San Francisco	May 24, 1862	106	
7	San Francisco	June 7, 1862	Hong Kong	July 24, 1862	46	
7	Hong Kong (see note) (Note: Between July and December 1862, Romance sailed to Bangkok and back; the exact dates are not known)	December 31, 1862	San Francisco	Lost during voyage		

== Artifacts ==
- Donald McKay's original half-hull working model is held by the Museum of Fine Arts Boston.
- Sailing cards advertising Romance's first two voyages to San Francisco are held by the Francis Russell Hart Nautical Museum of MIT. The one for the first voyage is reproduced in Yankee Ship Sailing Cards.

== See also ==
List of clipper ships
