= Snow Squall (clipper) =

American clipper ship, 1851–1864

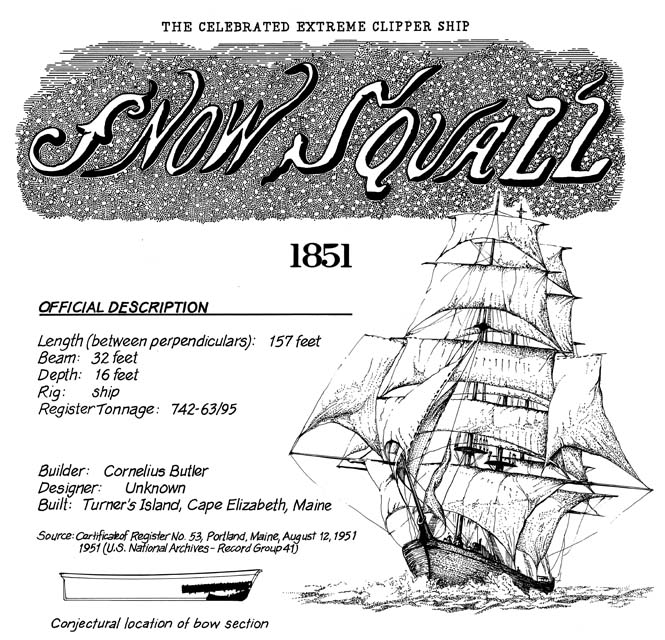
- Snow Squall on a Library of Congress record

History

United States
- Name: Snow Squall
- Builder: Cornelius Butler, Turner's Island, Cape Elizabeth, Maine
- Cost: $30,410
- Launched: 15 July 1851
- Fate: Ran aground, condemned and sold, 1864

General characteristics
- Type: Clipper
- Tons burthen: 743 tons
- Length: 157 ft (48 m)
- Beam: 32 ft (9.8 m)
- Draft: 16 ft (4.9 m)
- Propulsion: Sail

Snow Squall was an extreme wooden American clipper ship built in Maine for the China trade. A large part of her bow was preserved and is the sole remaining example of the American-built clipper ships.

== History ==
She was launched by Cornelius Butler at Turner's Island, Cape Elizabeth, Maine. She was bought by Charles R. Green of New York for $30,410.

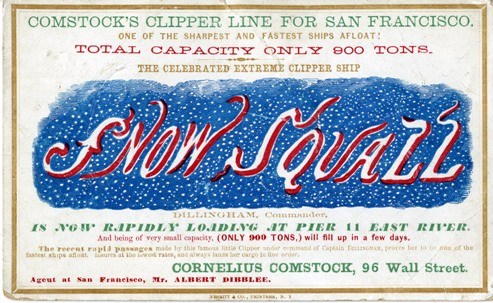
Snow Squall's sailing card, c. 1850.

She served on the Pacific and Atlantic routes for over ten years. She made the New York-San Francisco trip in 155 days.

On 1 March 1864, while carrying gunpowder among other cargo from New York to San Francisco, Snow Squall ran aground in the Straits of Le Marie in South America. She was delivered to Port Stanley in the Falkland Islands, where she was discharged of her cargo and found damaged beyond repair. In July, she was condemned and sold. The largest surviving piece was used as a dock at Port Stanley.

In 1979, she was rediscovered in the Falklands, and in 1982, a 32-foot portion of her bow and other remains were returned to Maine. Since 1995, the bow resides at the Maine Maritime Museum, Bath, Maine. It is the sole remaining example of the hundreds of American-built clipper ships.

== See also ==
- Clipper
- Extreme clipper
- List of clipper ships
