= Bald Eagle (clipper) =

19th c. American clipper ship

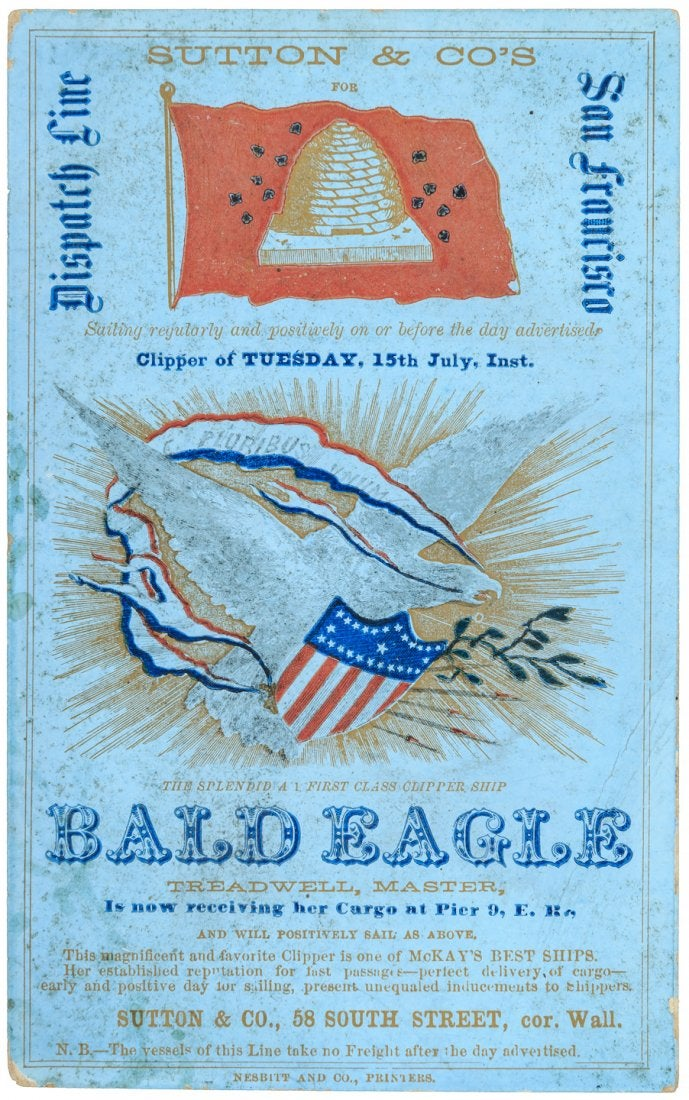
- Bald Eagle sailing card

History

United States
- Name: Bald Eagle
- Owner: George B. Upton
- Builder: Donald McKay of East Boston, MA
- Launched: November 1852
- Fate: Disappeared on a voyage after leaving Hong Kong on 15 October 1861

General characteristics
- Class & type: Extreme clipper
- Tons burthen: 1705 tons
- Length: (keel) 195 ft. (59.4m)
- Beam: 41.6 ft. (12.6m)
- Draft: 22.5 ft. (6.9m)
- Sail plan: "10,500 yards of canvas"
- Notes: Set a record for a fully loaded ship from San Francisco to New York

Bald Eagle was a clipper ship launched in 1852 which made four round-trip passages from eastern U.S. ports before being lost on her fifth voyage in the Pacific Ocean in 1861. She set the record, 78 days 22 hours, for the fastest passage of a fully loaded ship between San Francisco and New York.

== Her voyages ==
The Bald Eagle's voyages are listed here. Sources disagree on some departure and arrival dates and passage lengths; disagreements or ambiguities are individually cited. City names are entered as spelled at the time.

Voyage	Origin	Depart	Destination	Arrive	Days	Captain
1	New York	December 25 or 26, 1852	San Francisco	April 11, 1853	108 or 107	Philip Dumaresq
1	San Francisco	May 8, 1853	New York	August 13, 1853	96	Philip Dumaresq
2	New York	October 1 or 2, 1853	San Francisco	January 25, 1854	116 or 115	Albert Henry Caldwell
2	San Francisco	March 1 or 2, 1854	New York	May 19, 1854	78 days 22 hours or 79	Albert Henry Caldwell
3	New York		San Francisco	February 23, 1855	115 or 117	Albert Henry Caldwell
3	San Francisco		Hong Kong		47	Charles T. Treadwell
3	Swatow, China		Callao, Peru	November 26, 1855		Charles T. Treadwell
3	Callao		Philadelphia	May 4, 1856		Charles T. Treadwell
4	New York	July 18, 1856	San Francisco	November 15, 1856	120	Charles T. Treadwell
4	San Francisco	December 7, 1856	Calcutta	February 5, 1857	58 or 59	Charles T. Treadwell
4	Calcutta	April 26, 1857	Boston	August 2, 1857	98	Charles T. Treadwell
5	Boston	September 21, 1857	Hong Kong		108 or 109	Edward Nickels
5	Shanghai or Hong Kong	August 6, 1859	Liverpool	December 21, 1859	120	Edward Nickels
5	Liverpool	February 21, 1860	Anjer, Indonesia	May 24, 1860	93 or 94	Edward Nickels
5	Anjer, Indonesia		Shanghai	June 25, 1860	32	Edward Nickels
5	Hong Kong		San Francisco	April 24 or 25, 1861	41	Edward Nickels
5	San Francisco	June 16, 1861	Hong Kong via Honolulu	August 25, 1961	56	Edward Nickels
5	Hong Kong	October 15, 1861	San Francisco	Lost during voyage		Morris (given name unknown)

== Her fate ==
Although Basil Lubbock wrote an account that in October 1861 Bald Eagle came under attack by Chinese pirates while en route to Peru with a cargo of Chinese laborers, was put on fire, and then abandoned at sea some 500 miles east of Manila, there is little evidence to support his account. Richard McKay calls it a "fake yarn" and cites F. C. Matthews, a "well-known authority of ships...of the past" that Bald Eagle sailed from Hong Kong for San Francisco with a cargo including rice, sugar, tea, and "treasure" and was never heard of again.

== See also ==
List of clipper ships
