= Cremorne Gardens =

Cremorne Gardens was the name of two pleasure gardens established in England and Australia in the mid 19th century by James Ellis .

- Cremorne Gardens, London, established in 1846
- Cremorne Gardens, Melbourne, Australia, established in 1853
- Cremorne Gardens, Sydney, Australia established in 1856
- original name of the Cremorne Theatre, Brisbane, Queensland, Australia
- Cremorne Gardens, established in the 19th century in Herne Bay, New Zealand
- Cremorne Gardens, New York City, established in 1862.

== See also ==
- Cremorne (disambiguation)
- Cremorna Garden
