= Ocean Chief (clipper) =

Packet Clipper Ships UK to Australia between 1854 and 1962

Coordinates: 21.351°N 88.516°E

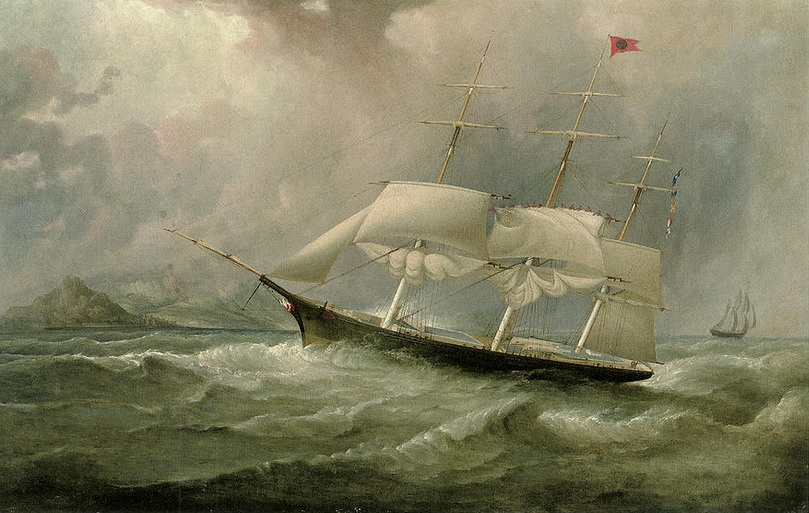

History

United Kingdom
- Name: Ocean Chief (1853)
- Owner: James Baines & Co.
- Operator: Black Ball Line
- Route: United Kingdom−Australia
- Builder: Joshua C. Morton, Thomaston, Maine, USA
- Completed: 1853
- Acquired: 1854
- Fate: Burnt, 1862 Bluff Harbour New Zealand

General characteristics
- Type: Clipper
- Tonnage: 1,026 gross register tons (GRT)
- Length: 182 ft (55 m)
- Beam: 34 ft (10 m)
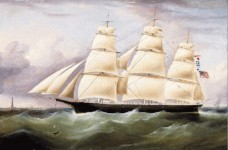

History

United Kingdom
- Name: Wild Ranger
- Builder: J. O. Curtis, Medford, Massachusetts, United States
- Completed: 1853
- Renamed: Ocean Chief, 1862
- Owner: James Baines & Co. (1862-1866)
- Operator: Black Ball Line (1862-1866)
- Route: United Kingdom−Australia
- Acquired: 1862
- Fate: Sank off Calcutta in 1872

General characteristics
- Type: Clipper
- Tonnage: 930 gross register tons (GRT)

Ocean Chief was a clipper ship used in a regular packet service and as a passenger ship for bounty emigrants to Australia between June 1854 and December 1861 at the time of the Australian gold rushes.

== Original ==
The original Ocean Chief was built in the United States at Thomaston, Maine, by Joshua C. Morton (born 1789) and his son Charles, one of two clippers that they built. Completed in 1853, she was a fast and consistent sailer and made an average passage of 74 days.

The Black Ball Line (founded 1852 – ceased 1871) owners James Baines & Thomas MacKay, Liverpool purchased the vessel for a regular mail service between Liverpool and Melbourne. She also visited other ports including Hobart, Tasmania, and New Zealand.

In 1862, Ocean Chief arrived at Bluff Harbour, New Zealand, under Captain T. Brown, with a cargo of 4,000 sheep. On the morning of 23 January 1862, the crew burned ship, believing that they could get rich in the nearby Otago gold rush.

=== Voyages ===
Ocean Chief voyages
Departed	Date	Arrived	Date	Captain	Passengers	Days
England (Liverpool)	23 May 1854	Melbourne, Australia	7 August 1854	Thomas James Tobin		77
Australia	-	England	-	Thomas James Tobin		86
England	11 January 1855	Hobart, Australia	26 March 1855	Thomas James Tobin	370	75
Australia	-	England	-	Thomas James Tobin		69
England	8 October 1855	Australia	January 1856	-	362	
Australia	-	England	-			
England	–	Australia	May 1858	-		
Australia	-	England	-			
England	–	Australia	February 1859	-		
Australia	-	England	-			
England	5 September 1859	Australia	30 November 1859	William Brown	109	86
Australia	-	England	-			
England	5 July 1860	Melbourne, Australia	2 October 1860	-		
Australia	-	England	-			
England (Liverpool)	May 1861	Melbourne, Australia	21 July 1861	William Brown	152	81
Australia	-	England	-			
England	–	Melbourne, Australia	December 1861	-		
		Burnt New Zealand	23 January 1862	T. Brown		

== Replacement ==
Another ship, named Wild Ranger – built in the United States in 1853 by J. O. Curtis at Medford, Massachusetts – was purchased in 1862 as a replacement ship and renamed Ocean Chief. This ship was slightly smaller, being of 930 tons. In 1866, she was sold to E. Angel, Liverpool. She sank in a large storm in the Bay of Bengal off Calcutta, India, in 1872.
