= Starlight (clipper) =

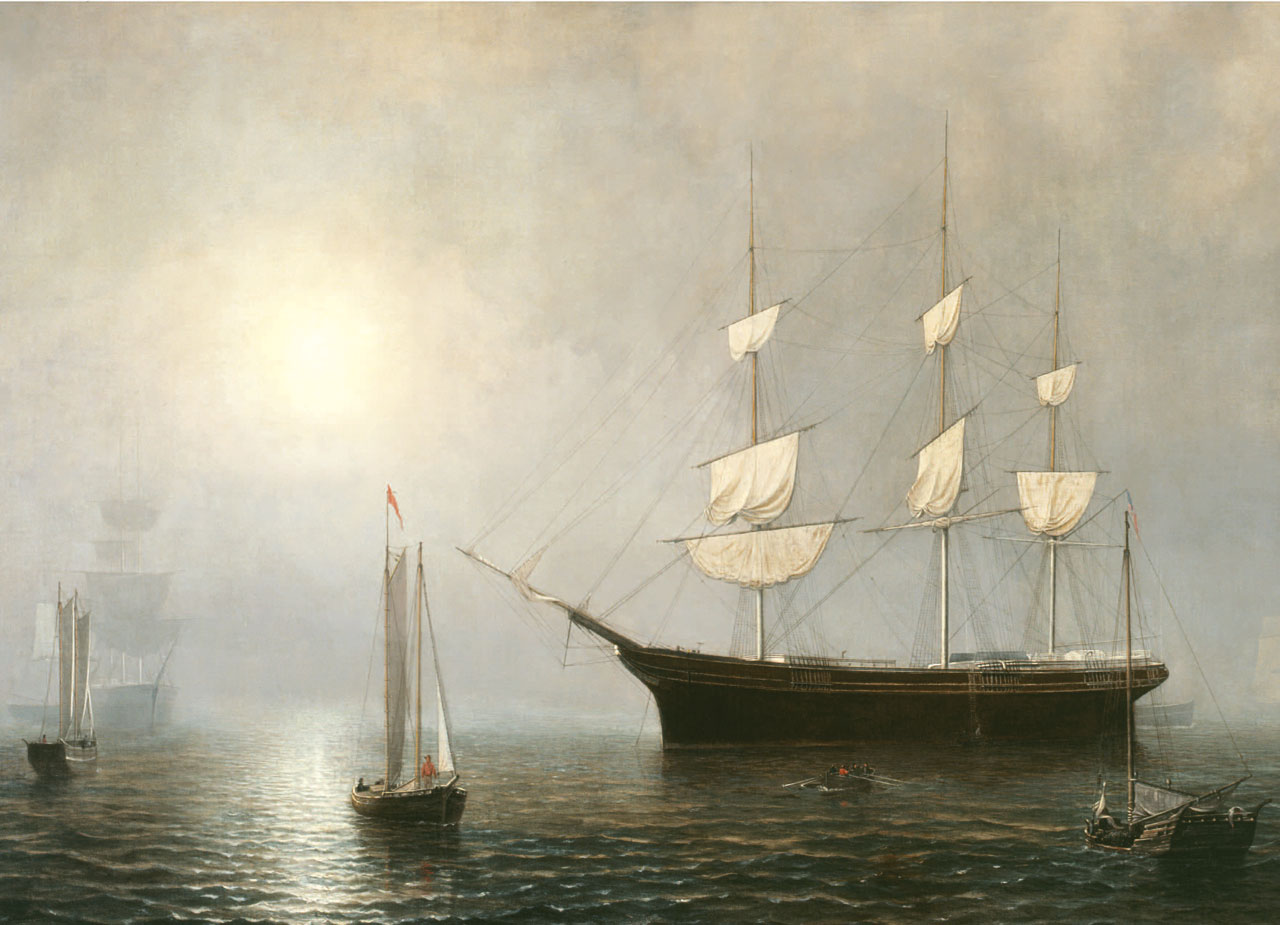
- Starlight, by Fitz Hugh Lane

History

United States
- Name: Starlight, changed to
- Owner: Baker & Morrill, Boston
- Builder: E.&H.O. Briggs, South Boston
- Launched: Feb. 11, 1854
- Renamed: R. Protolongo or Proto Longo

General characteristics
- Class & type: Medium clipper
- Tons burthen: 1153 tons
- Length: 190 ft (58 m). LOA
- Beam: 37 ft (11 m)
- Draft: 23 ft (7.0 m)

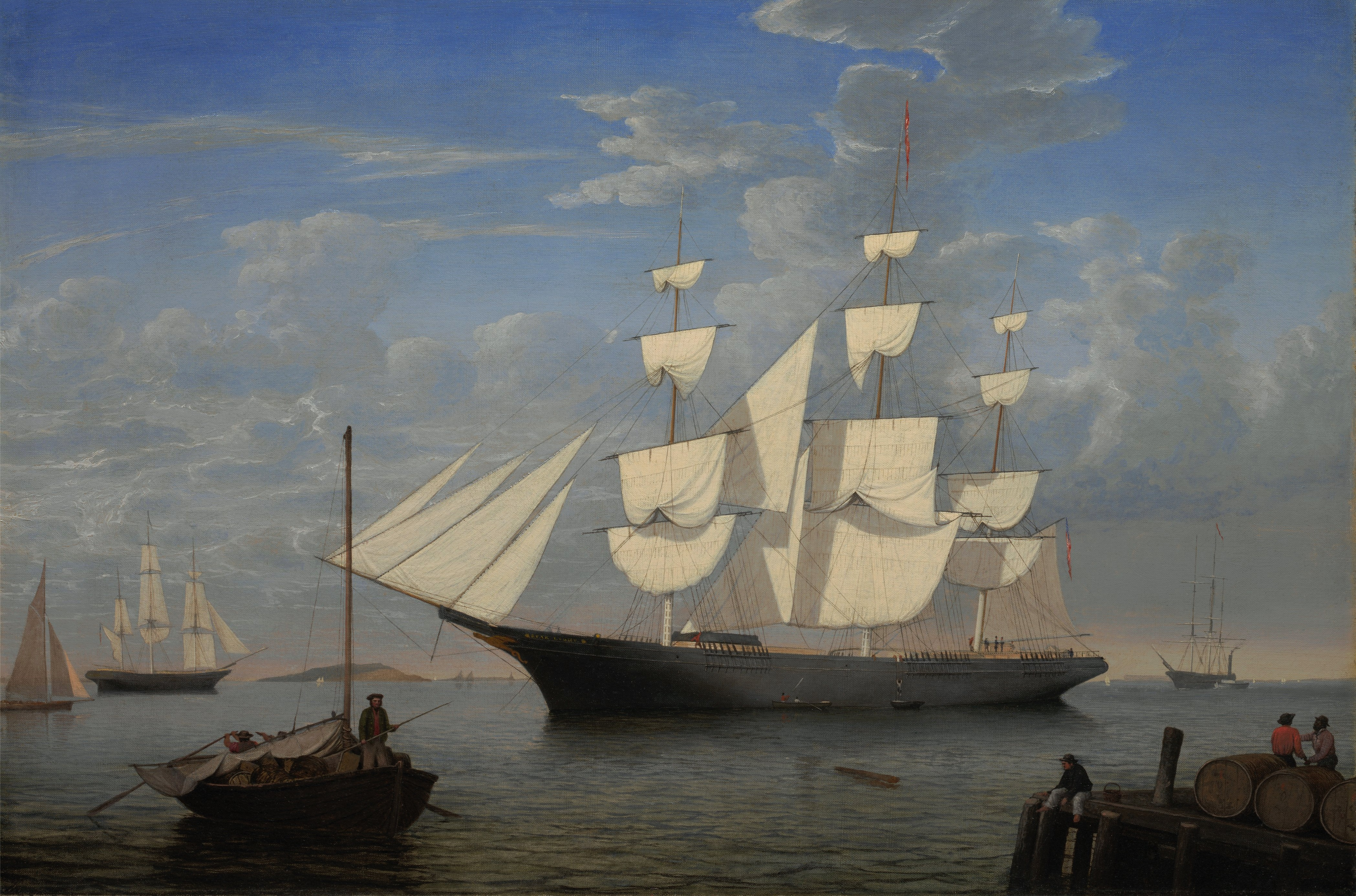
Starlight in harbor, by Fitz Hugh Lane

Starlight was a medium clipper built in 1854 in South Boston, Massachusetts that made nine passages from New York City or Boston to San Francisco. The ship was known in its day for "making passages faster than average". Starlight is better remembered today as the subject of two paintings by artist Fitz Hugh Lane. Starlight was described as having "spacious staterooms" and a figurehead resembling "the representation of an antediluvian bird of Paradise spliced into a mermaid".

== Voyages ==
Starlight sailed for the Glidden & Williams line in the California trade. Starlight's fastest voyages between New York and Boston to San Francisco were 117 and 118 days. The slowest voyage was 145 days.

Starlight also served in the Asia and British trade, and carried horses from Adelaide, Australia, to Calcutta, India in 1862. In May 1862, Starlight left Calcutta bound for Boston. Sailing twelve hours later from Calcutta was the ship Belle of the West, whose captain was a brother of Starlight's captain. Another member of Starlight's crew had a brother on Belle of the West who was serving as chief mate. The two ships arrived in Boston within twelve hours of each other, having sighted each other three times en route.

Starlight's name was changed to R. Protolongo or Proto Longo in 1864 after she entered the coolie trade, transporting Chinese workers to work in the guano fields of Peru.

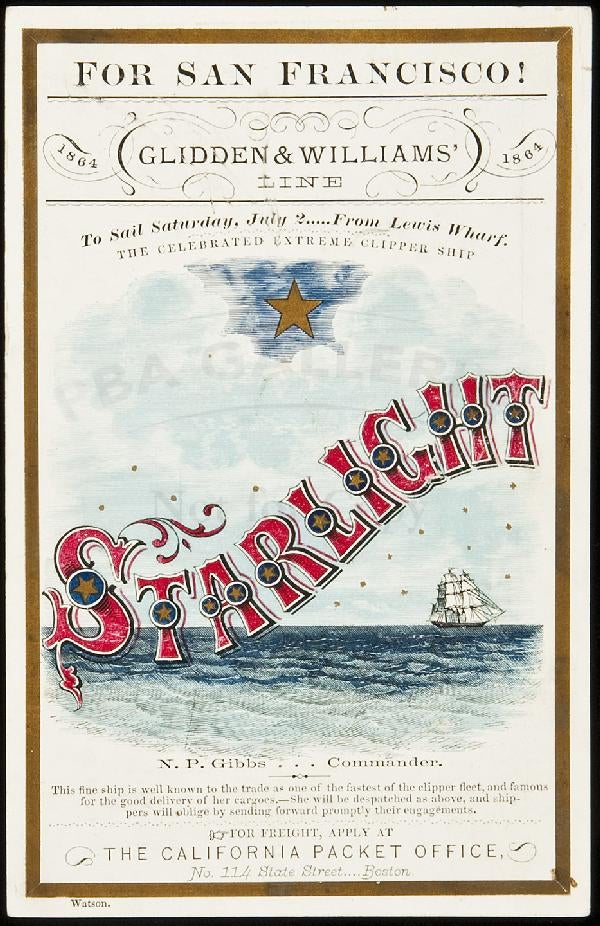
Clipper ship sailing card
