= Miako (barque) =

English composite barque

History

United Kingdom
- Name: Miako
- Owner: Killick Martin & Company, London
- Builder: William pile, Sunderland
- Launched: 15 April 1869

United Kingdom
- Owner: Thomas Roberts and Sons, Llanelly, Carmarthenshire
- Acquired: 24 July 1885

Spain
- Owner: E Borbones, Barcelona
- Acquired: 1894
- Renamed: Asunción

Spain
- Owner: Perez, Castro & Company, Santa Cruz de la Palms
- Acquired: 1908
- Renamed: Isla de la Palma

Cuba
- Name: Isla de la Palma
- Acquired: 1912
- Fate: Converted into a barge

General characteristics
- Class & type: Composite barque
- Tonnage: 535 GRT
- Length: 160.1 ft (48.8 m)
- Beam: 30.1 ft (9.2 m)
- Depth: 17.1 ft (5.2 m)

Miako, A composite barque, built by William Pile, Sunderland, at Yard No. 181 for Killick Martin & Company, the company founded by Captain James Killick and launched on 15 April 1869. William Pile also built Miako's sister ship Osaka, for Killick Martin & Company launched on 12 July 1869. The name Miako, today spelt Miyako is a city located in Iwate Prefecture, Japan.

William Pile also built City of Adelaide the world's oldest surviving clipper ship, of only two that survive — the other being the Cutty Sark.

Miako's dimensions were 48.8 x 9.2 x 5.2 meters [160’1"×30’1"×17'1"] and 535 GRT, 516 NRT.

Under Killick Martin & Company's ownership Miako had five captains. The first was Captain William Anderson, between 1869 and 1874, former Captain of Challenger Between 1874 and 1876 Henry Cape took command. Then William Knight from 1876 to 1879 and then Frederick William Dexter from 1879 to 1883. Finally George Albert Coutanche from 1883 to 1885.

Miako's maiden voyage was to Yokohama, San Francisco, Sydney, Shanghai, Hong Kong, Whampoa, Buenos Aires, Antwerp, then back to London.

Throughout her life she continued to make varied passages visiting an incredible range of ports from those listed above, to New York, Port Elizabeth, Swatow, Amoy, Samarang, Batavia, Saigon, Belfast and Boulogne carrying cargoes of coal, rice, sugar, coconut oil, coffee, and hemp.

Miako was sold on 24 July 1885 to Thomas Roberts, Llanelly, Carmarthenshire. Two of Miako's fastest passages were whilst she was owned by Thomas Robert. Mauritius to Melbourne in 1890 in 26.5 days and Melbourne to Boston in 1890–91 with a passage of 83.5 days. She was reported to have sailed 2200 miles in 9 days. Both these passages were said to be records at the time.

In 1894 Miako's was sold to E Borbones and J Borbones, later E Borbones of Barcelona and her name was changed on to Asunción.

In 1908-11 she was owned by Perez, Castro & Company and registered at Santa Cruz de la Palms and in 1911 Tenerife. Her name was changed again from 1908 to Isla de la Palma.

In 1912 she was converted into a barge in Cuba and her name drops out of the registers.
