= Cremorne (clipper) =

American clipper ship

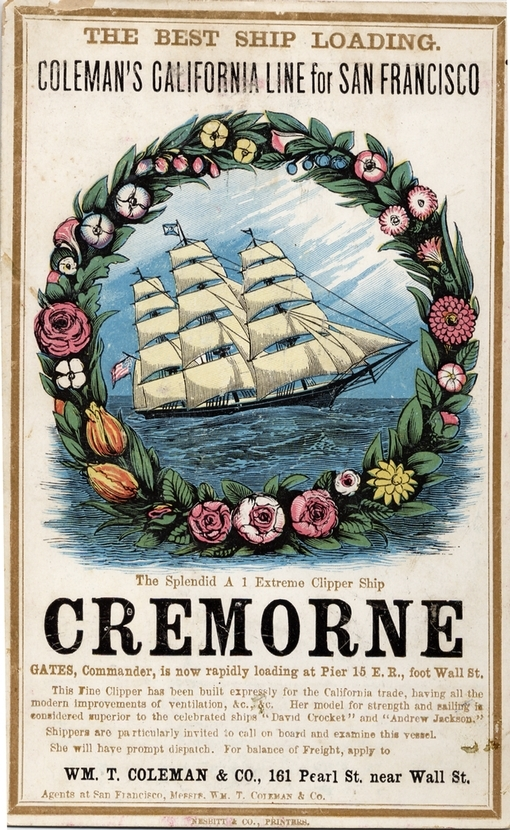
- Advertisement for Cremorne

History

United States
- Name: Cremorne
- Owner: Lawrence, Giles & Co., New York
- Builder: Maxson, Fish & Co., Mystic, Connecticut
- Launched: March 19, 1863
- Fate: Missing 1870

General characteristics
- Class & type: Extreme clipper
- Tons burthen: 1,413 tons
- Length: 200 ft (61.0 m) loa
- Beam: 39 ft (11.9 m)
- Depth of hold: 14 ft (4.3 m)

Cremorne was a clipper ship of Sutton and Co.'s Dispatch Line and Coleman's California Line. She sailed between New York and San Francisco. Her services were advertised in sailing cards.

== Construction ==
The hull was built by Maxson, Fish & Co. in Mystic, Connecticut. The owners of the vessel were Lawrence, Giles & Co. of New York. Her first commander was Captain Isaac D. Gates. "Her intended service was the California and East India Trade ...

This vessel is well built, and in every respect thoroughly and heavily fastened with composition spikes, copper butt bolts, and treenails. Her keel is of white oak, also her keelsons of three thicknesses, all edge-bolted. Her frames are of white oak and white chestnut, very heavy; ceiling, white oak, beams and deck frame, white chestnut, all full kneed with hacmetac and oak knees; clamps are edge-bolted; patent windlass. Has six hooks and pointers forward, and same number aft."

== Voyages ==
"Of six westward passages to San Francisco, four were completed to New York, and one carried wheat to Liverpool. Her record run was from San Francisco to the Equator in 14 days."

== Locomotive transport ==
"One ship carrying a locomotive, Cremorne, sailed through a hurricane in October 1865."

Cremorne left New York on October 21, 1865, and arrived in San Francisco on March 9, 1866, after a voyage of 140 days, carrying Central Pacific locomotive CP 11.

== Fate of the ship ==
"Cremorne was posted as missing in 1870." "On June 1, 1870, the Cremorne passed through the Golden Gate bound for Liverpool ... and she was never heard from again."

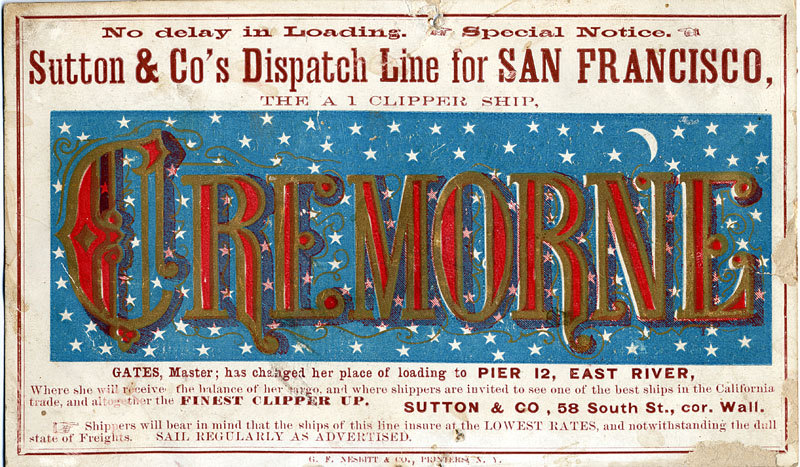
Cremorne clipper ship sailing card

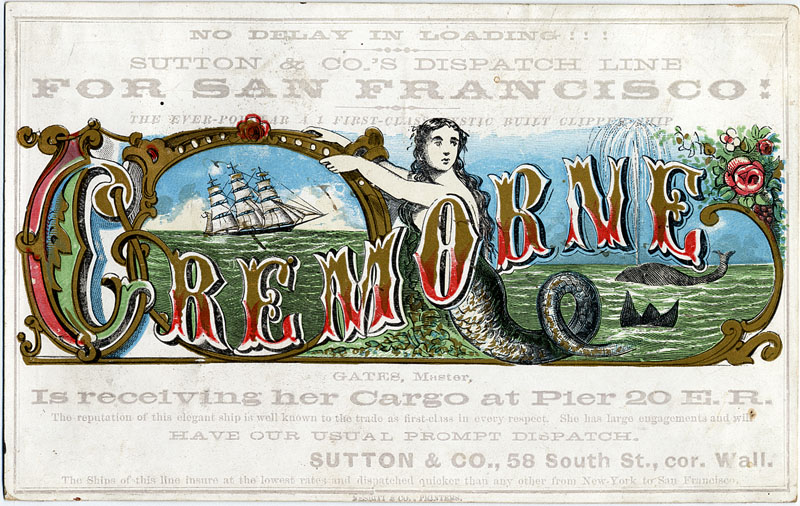
Cremorne clipper ship sailing card

== See also ==
- South Street Seaport
