= Golden South (1852) =

History

United States
- Name: Flying Childers
- Namesake: Flying Childers
- Owner: J.M. Forbes and Cunningham Brothers, Boston
- Builder: Samuel Hall of East Boston, MA
- Launched: 11 November 1852
- Fate: Sold to the United Kingdom, 1863

United Kingdom
- Name: Golden South
- Acquired: 1863
- Fate: Destroyed by fire, 29 May 1893

General characteristics
- Class & type: Medium clipper
- Tons burthen: 1125 tons
- Length: 183.9 feet (56.1 m)
- Beam: 36.4 feet (11.1 m)
- Draft: 22.6 feet (6.9 m)

The Golden South was a clipper ship built in 1852, as Flying Childers.

Built by Samuel Hall of East Boston, Massachusetts for J.M. Forbes and Cunningham Brothers, Boston. She sailed between Boston to San Francisco and Whampoa to Deal. She was sold in 1858 for $53,000. She then sailed from New York to San Francisco and Boston to San Francisco. Sold in 1863 to Mackay, Baines & Company, Liverpool for £5050 and renamed Golden South, for the Liverpool to Australia trade.

She was sold in 1866 and later used as a coal hulk at Port Jackson, Sydney.

== Fate ==
On Monday 29 May 1893, awaiting breaking up, she was destroyed by fire after the hulk Vernon caught ablaze in Kerosene Bay, Sydney.
