= Windsor Castle (1857 ship) =

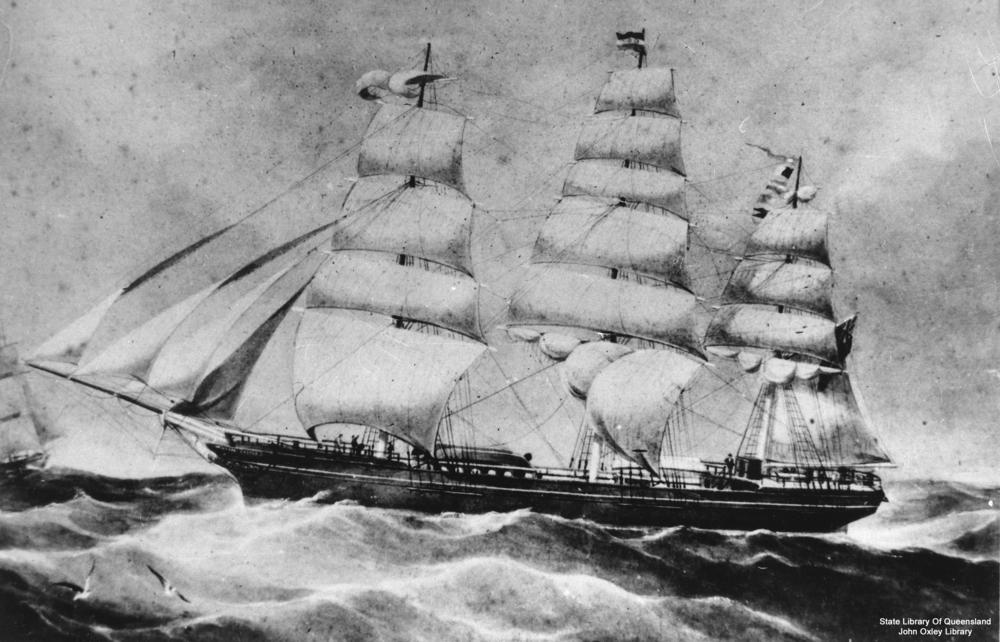
- Windsor Castle under way

History

United Kingdom
- Name: Windsor Castle
- Namesake: Windsor Castle
- Owner: 1857: Richard Green; 1882: Elias Cox
- Port of registry: London
- Builder: William Pile, Sunderland
- Launched: 12 March 1857
- Completed: May 1857
- Identification: UK official number 15822; code letters LTVQ
- Fate: Wrecked 1884

General characteristics
- Type: wooden-hulled sailing ship
- Tonnage: 1,075 GRT, 1,075 NRT
- Length: 195.5 ft (59.6 m)
- Beam: 36.2 ft (11.0 m)
- Depth: 22.5 ft (6.9 m)
- Sail plan: full-rigged ship
- Complement: 21

Windsor Castle was a wooden-hulled, three-masted sailing ship that was built in England in 1857, and wrecked off the coast of Cape Colony in 1884.

== Building ==
William Pile built Windsor Castle in his North Shore shipyard in Sunderland, launching her on 12 March 1857, and completing her that May. The ship was built for Richard Green, who registered her in London. Her United Kingdom official number was 15822 and her code letters were LTVQ.

== Career ==
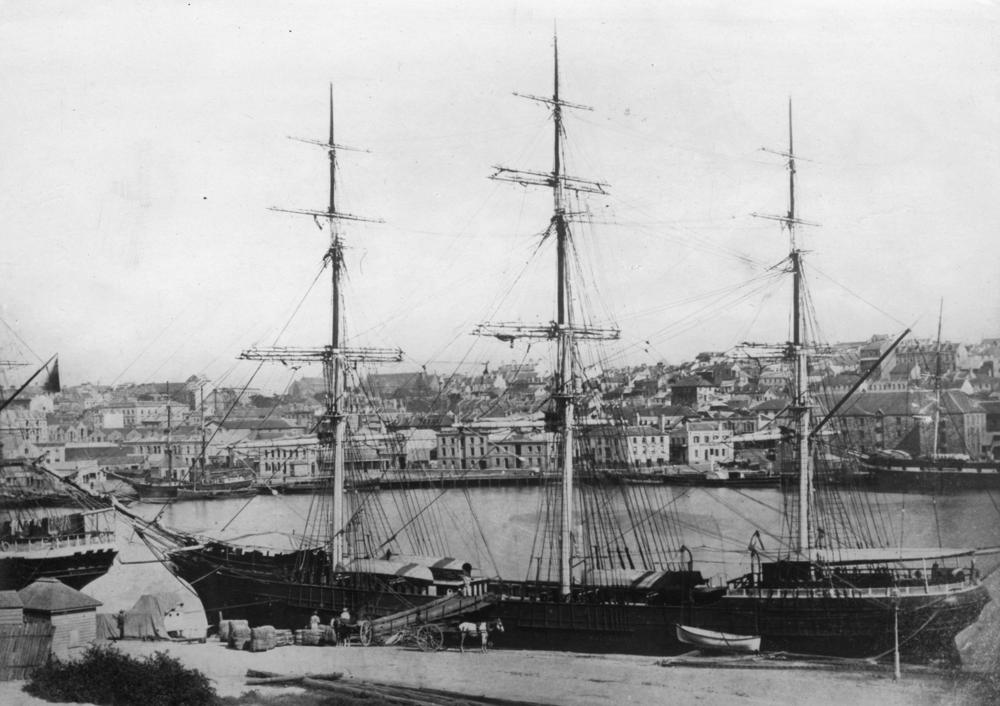
Windsor Castle in port

Windsor Castle sailed between England and Australia. The Queensland Migrant Shipping records show her carrying passengers between 1877 and 1881.

In 1876, Captain N Harrison was Windsor Castle's Master.

After she was extensively overhauled in July 1882, the government sometimes chartered the ship to transport troops to Zanzibar and Sydney.

In 1882, Elias Cox of Bridport, Dorset bought Windsor Castle. According to Lloyd's Register she remained registered in London, but according to the Mercantile Navy List she was re-registered in Bridport.

In 1884, Windsor Castle was sailing from Cochin to London when a cyclone on 27–28 June washed the third officer overboard and swept away her rudder. She drifted for the next 12 days. Her remaining crew of 21 men then set her afire, abandoned her 35 nautical miles (65 km) off the coast of Algoa Bay, Cape Colony. The Norwegian barque Ophir rescued the crew.

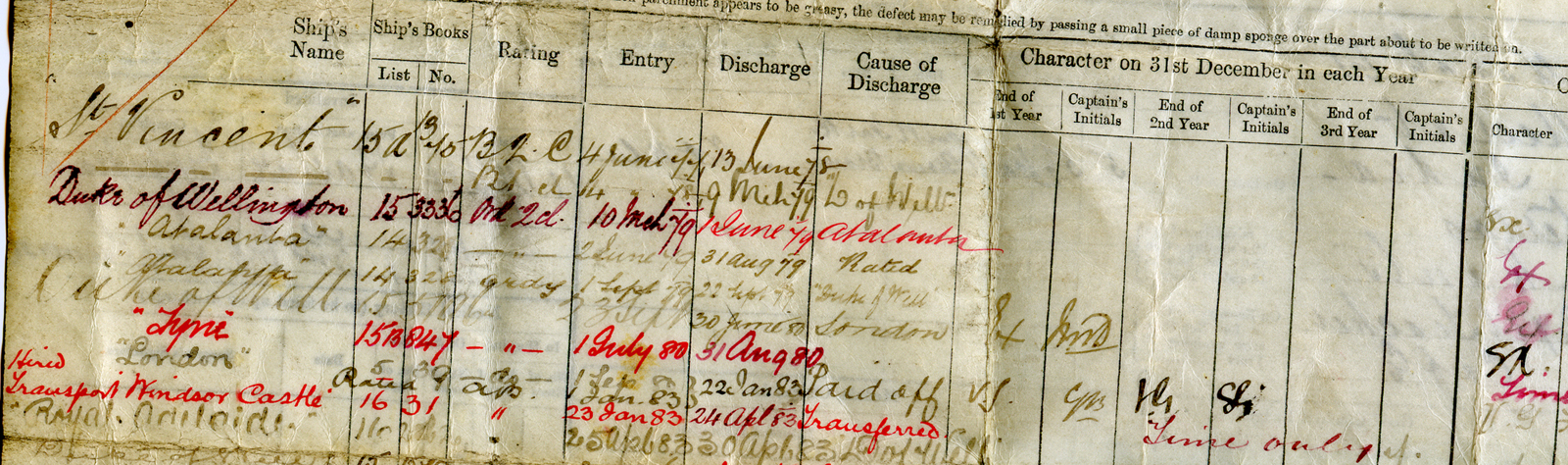
A Royal Navy service record showing time served on the transport Windsor Castle
