= Benoni Lockwood III =

American ship captain

Benoni Lockwood III (1805–1851) was an American ship captain who set an ocean-crossing speed record during the era of the clipper ships.

== Biography ==
Benoni Lockwood III was the son of sea captain and engineer Benoni Lockwood II (1777-1852) and Phebe Greene of Rhode Island and the brother of engineer Amos D. Lockwood. He married Amelia Cooley, with whom he had a son, Benoni Lockwood IV. Their granddaughter Florence Bayard Lockwood married the architect Christopher Grant La Farge and was the mother of writer Christopher La Farge.

Lockwood was a ship captain engaged in the East India trade. In 1845, he sailed the 573-ton Tartar, built in Philadelphia, from Holyhead, Wales, to Bombay, India, in a then-record time of 77 days (April 4—June 19).

In 1851, he captained the 200-foot-long, 1100-ton fast clipper White Squall from San Francisco to Hong Kong, where he died. Although newly built in 1851, the White Squall only saw two years of service, burning in a fire in New York Harbor in 1853.
