= Hoxie (surname) =

Hoxie is a surname. Notable people with the surname include:

- Al Hoxie (1901–1982), American film actor
- Andrew Hoxie (born 1986), American professional soccer player
- Charles A. Hoxie (1867–1941), American scientist
- Herbert Melville Hoxie (1830-1886), American pioneer, abolitionist, railroad executive
- Jack Hoxie (1885–1965), American rodeo rider and actor
- Jean Hoxie (1898–1970), American tennis player and coach
- John Randolph Hoxie (1831–1896), American politician and business person
- Joseph C. Hoxie (1814-1870), American architect
- R. Gordon Hoxie (1919–2002), American educator and college administrator
- Robert F. Hoxie (1868–1916), American economist
- Richard L. Hoxie (1844–1930), American brigadier general
