= Mary Robinson (clipper) =

Clipper ship in XIX cent. United States

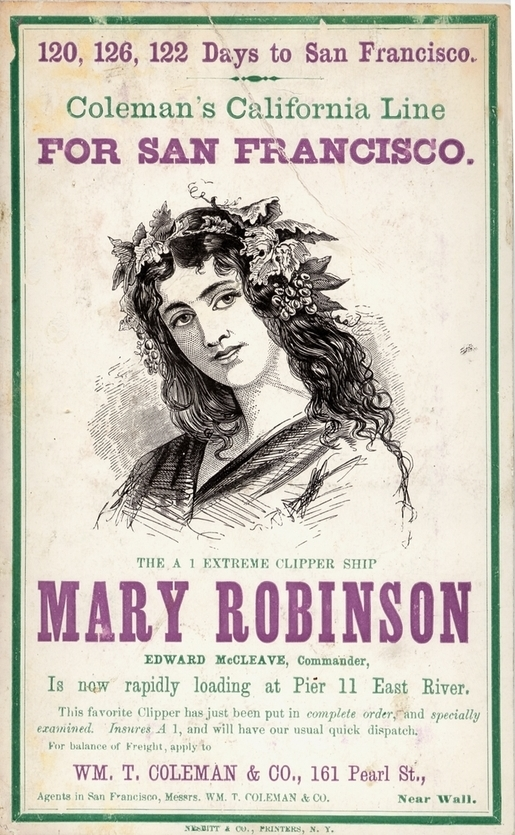

History

United States
- Name: Mary Robinson
- Owner: E.M. Robinson, New Bedford, MA
- Builder: Trufant and Drummond, Bath, ME
- Launched: 1854
- Fate: Lost June 27, 1864
- Notes: Marryat ID number, 3rd, 2-7-9-3

General characteristics
- Class & type: Medium clipper
- Tons burthen: 1371 tons
- Length: 215 ft.
- Beam: 38 ft. 6 in.
- Draft: 22 ft.
- Notes: 2 decks. Named after the wife of the owner.

Mary Robinson was an 1854 medium clipper in the San Francisco, India, and the guano trades. She was known for having spent an entire month attempting to round Cape Horn in bad weather.

== Voyages ==
Mary Robinson made six voyages, from Boston to New York and then to San Francisco. In 1864, Mary ran her fastest run in 115 days. She was accompanied by Carrier Dove off Cape Horn on this trip, and beat Carrier Dove to San Francisco by 18 days.

On her maiden run, Mary Robinson was not as fortunate. She spent 30 days rounding Cape Horn in "heavy gales and continual snow storms".

During the commercial panic of 1857, Mary Robinson was one of the many American clippers that was put into the more profitable British trade between India and England.

Mary Robinson made a very fast passage in 1858. She made it in 58 days from San Francisco to Melbourne, continuing with 40 days from Melbourne to Honolulu.

== Guano trade and loss of the ship ==
In 1858, Mary Robinson loaded guano at Jarvis Island for New York. Mary Robinson was lost June 27, 1864, on a voyage from San Francisco at Howland's Island, in the Pacific (01°N 176°W). She was loading guano when a squall drove her up on the reef. The next day she slid off and sunk in deep water, with 1300 tons of guano aboard.
