= Lord of the Isles (clipper) =

1853 British tea clipper

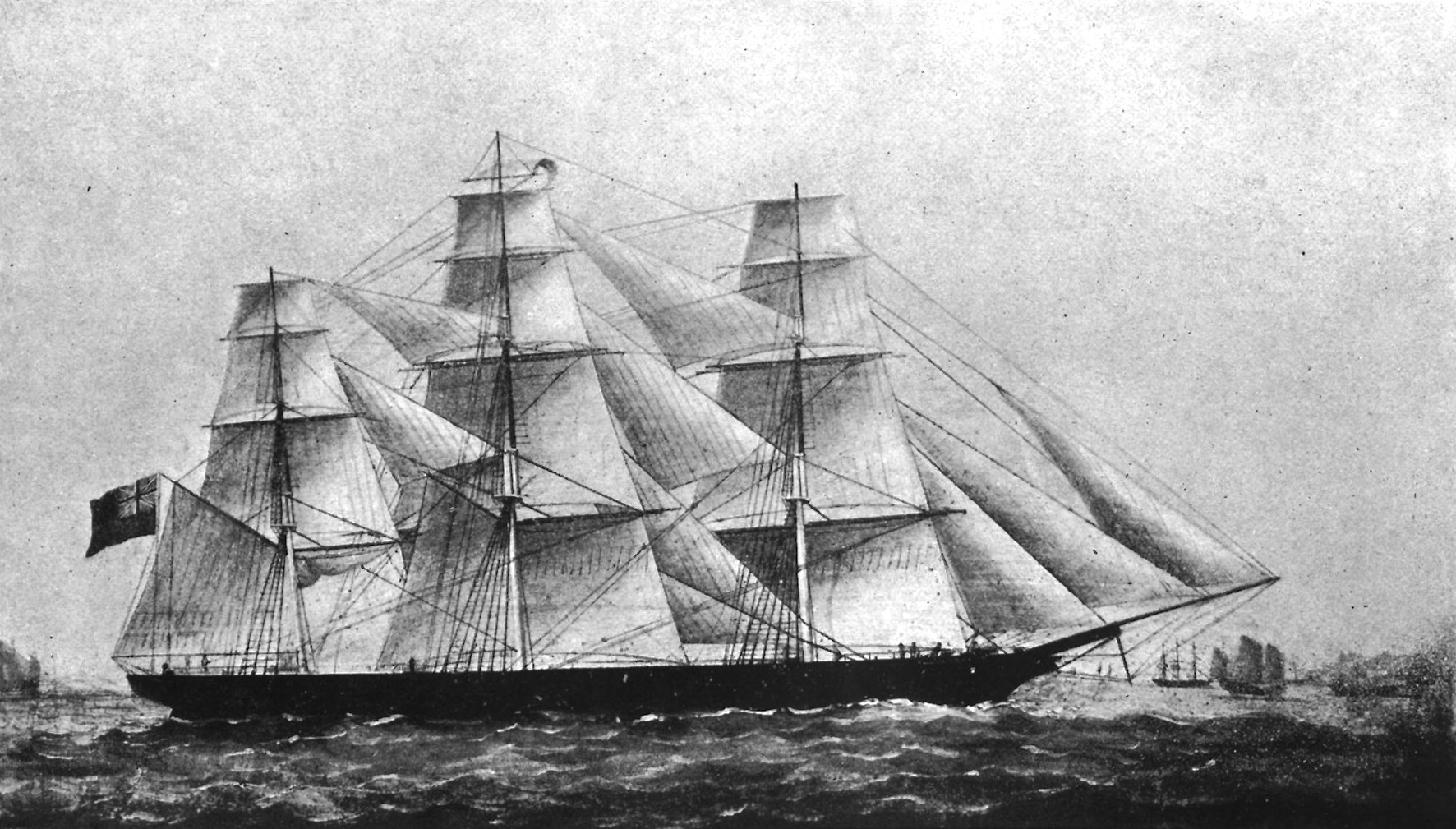

History

United Kingdom
- Name: Lord of the Isles
- Builder: Charles Scott & Co., Greenock
- Launched: 1853
- Fate: Caught fire 24 July 1862

General characteristics
- Class & type: Iron-hulled tea clipper
- Tonnage: 770 tons OM; 691 tons NM
- Length: 210 ft (64 m) Length overall; 185 ft (56 m) Length of keel
- Beam: 27.8 ft (8.5 m)
- Depth of hold: 18.5 ft (5.6 m)
- Sail plan: fully rigged ship

Lord of the Isles was the first iron-hulled tea clipper, built in Greenock in 1853. She served in the tea trade until 1862, and also made voyages to Australia. She is known for a record passage between Greenock and Shanghai, and for her close finish in the 1856 Tea Race from China to England, docking in London just ten minutes before Maury. This race was the basis for the plot of a 1927 movie by Cecil B. DeMille The Yankee Clipper.

== Construction ==
The construction of Lord of the Isles was considered to be ahead of her time. Her hull was built entirely of iron. She had a higher proportion of beam to length for the vessels of that decade, with a ratio of 6:4. Her ends were so fine that she earned the nickname "The Diving Bell", as her well-known skipper Capt. Peter Maxton said she would dive into one side of a sea and out at the other.

== Voyages ==
Lord of the Isles' maiden voyage, from Greenock to Sydney, Australia was 70 days. In 1858, she returned to Greenock from Shanghai in a record time of 89 days. She made three voyages to Australia, but her principal route was the tea trade between London and the Chinese cities of Whampoa and Shanghai.

== Race with Maury in 1856 ==
In 1856, Lord of the Isles raced the American clipper bark Maury, for a price of a one-pound-per-ton premium to be awarded to the first ship to reach London bearing the year's new crop of tea. Lord of the Isles finished loading first, and set sail four days ahead of Maury. After a 127-day voyage and thirteen thousand miles of ocean sailing, the two ships passed Gravesend "within ten minutes of each other". Having a better tugboat at her disposal, Lord of the Isles docked as the first tea ship of the season, winning the honors.

Lord of the Isles was known for delivering her cargoes undamaged. Despite her success, iron ships did not become popular in the tea trade, and there were no further iron tea clippers built until the 1870s.

== Loss of the ship ==
On 24 July 1862, Lord of the Isles caught fire in the South China Sea at either 12°13′N 114°50′E or 12°13′N 115°50′E while en route to Hong Kong from Greenock, Scotland. The cause was thought to be spontaneous combustion of bales of felt placed next to her cargo of railroad iron. Captain Davies, the crew and passengers, thirty people in all, made Macao in the ship's boats, despite being boarded twice by pirates.

== In movies ==
The Yankee Clipper, a 1927 adventure movie produced by Cecil D. DeMille, features a race between Lord of the Isles against the American ship Yankee Clipper for rights to the Fuzhou tea trade. The film was shot aboard a surviving 1850s square-rigger, Indiana, and includes footage taken from high in the rigging under sail.
