= Kingfisher (clipper) =

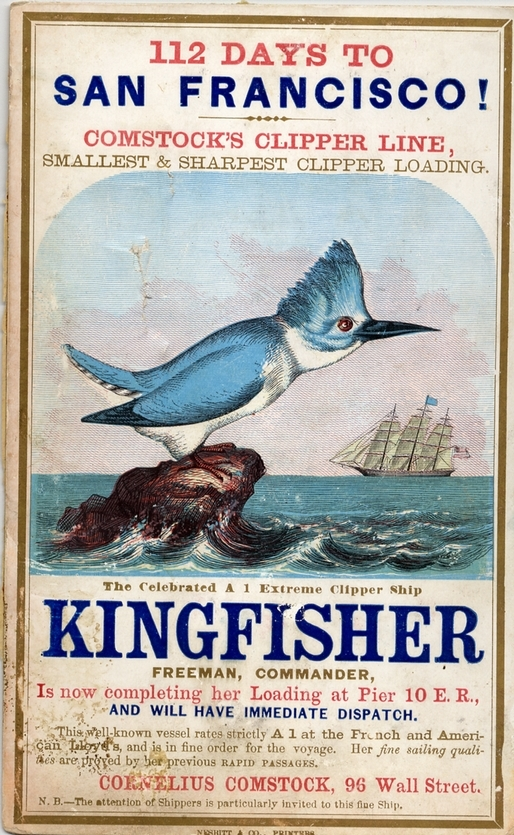

History

United States
- Name: Kingfisher
- Owner: William Lincoln, Boston
- Builder: Hayden & Cudworth, Medford, MA
- Launched: 1853

Uruguay
- Owner: Ciblis Family
- Port of registry: Uruguay
- Acquired: 1871
- Out of service: 1890
- Renamed: Jaime Ciblis
- Fate: Auctioned, broken up in Montevideo Bay.

General characteristics
- Class & type: Extreme clipper
- Length: 217 ft. OA
- Beam: 37 ft. 2 in.
- Draft: 24 ft.
- Notes: 2 decks. Contemporary spelling was two words: King Fisher

Kingfisher was an extreme clipper built in 1853 that sailed on the San Francisco route as well as to Hawaii on its way to China. It eventually sailed out of Uruguay. She was one of the longest lived clipper ships, with a sailing life of 36 years and 5 months. A sailing card advertised her.

== Construction ==
She had a small deckhouse aft, and a larger deckhouse forward. The hull was black, with pearl colored bulwarks, and blue waterways on the upper deck. The hull sheathing was yellow metal. Kingfisher had deck structures and hatchway coamings of East India teak.

This was one of the relatively rare appearances of teak in an American-built clipper, other than in small turned stanchions.

She had:

Crane’s self-acting chain stoppers; two capstans, one on the topgallant forecastle, one on the quarterdeck; patent hold pumps; a force pump; Emerson’s patent ventilators.

== Life aboard ==
In the early 1860s, Joe Taylor, a member of the Backus’ Minstrels troupe en route to Shanghai via Hawaii, described Kingfisher as follows:

Probably no sailing vessel ever went to sea, better equipped for the comfort and pleasure of the passengers and crew than the Kingfisher. She carried two cows and two goats, together with pigs and poultry in abundance. Wines, liquors and cigars were distributed as free as water among the passengers, twenty-two in number; Mrs. Freeman and Mrs. Daniels being the only ladies.

== Voyages ==
Kingfisher arrived in Honolulu:

Dec. 14, 1862, ship Kingfisher, 1,286 tons, Freeman master, 13 days from San Francisco, en route for China. Was here again April 28, 1868, under Captain Gibbons, making a 24 days trip, to load guano at Baker's Island. On 20 June 1871, en route from San Francisco to New York, she sprang a leak and put into Montevideo, Uruguay, in distress. Was surveyed, condemned, and, in November 1871, was sold to the Ciblis family of that city. She was repaired, renamed Jaime Ciblis and sailed under the Uruguayan flag until 1890.

== Fate ==
In 1890 she was "sold at auction and broken up in Montevideo Bay".
