= Harriet Hoxie =

1851 clipper in the California trade

History

United States
- Name: Harriet Hoxie
- Owner: Post, Smith & Co., Mystic, CT
- Builder: Irons & Grinnell, Mystic, CT
- Launched: 1851
- Fate: Sold to Belgium, 1859

Belgium
- Owner: Callaux, Wattell & Co., Antwerp
- Port of registry: Belgium
- Acquired: 1859
- Fate: Unknown

General characteristics
- Tonnage: 678 tons OM
- Length: 140
- Beam: 33
- Draft: 18
- Sail plan: 3 mast ship rig

Harriet Hoxie was an 1851 clipper in the California trade. She was known for carrying cargoes of whale oil from Honolulu, and for importing the first Brown Leghorn chickens to the United States.

== Voyages ==
In 1852, New York City to San Francisco, 120 days net, under Capt. P.E. Rowland. She put into Valparaíso under jury rig for repairs for 12 days. Her best day on this trip was 311 mi., 16 knots. In 1853, New York to San Francisco, 140 days, under Capt. Manwaring. She spent 30 days off Cape Horn, and lost a foreyard. In 1855, Philadelphia to San Francisco, 128 days, under Capt. Manwaring.

== First whale oil charter from Honolulu ==
"Sept. 7, 1852, ship Harriet Hoxie, 671 tons, Rowland master. 11½ days from San Francisco, to load oil and bone for New Bedford, sailing in November. This was probably the first clipper chartered for this service, to permit whaleships to continue their cruising. Prior shipments of this nature had been largely made by whalers returning east if they had cargo space, otherwise, the lucky "full" ships had to break up their cruise and go home with their catch before the three years voyage they usually outfitted for was up."

== Imported first Brown Leghorn chickens ==
"In 1853 a Captain Gates on the ship Harriet Hoxie brought from Leghorn, Italy, to Mystic, Connecticut the first recognized importation of Brown Leghorns. They were left with Mr. Russell Brown, a stable-keeper, who bred and disseminated them over New England."

== Shipment of law books ==
During the wild and lawless Gold Rush era of San Francisco, in 1853, an ad ran in the "Daily Alta California", announcing a shipment of "Law Books! Received by Lecount and Strong, per clipper Harriet Hoxie.

== Description by a stowaway ==
A description of a voyage on Harriet Hoxie around Cape Horn, from Hawaii to New London, Connecticut, was written by N. Bryon Smith, a former crew member of the whaler Nile, of Greenport, New York. Smith stowed away on Harriet Hoxie in Hawaii to return home.
