= Flying Fish (clipper) =

American clippership

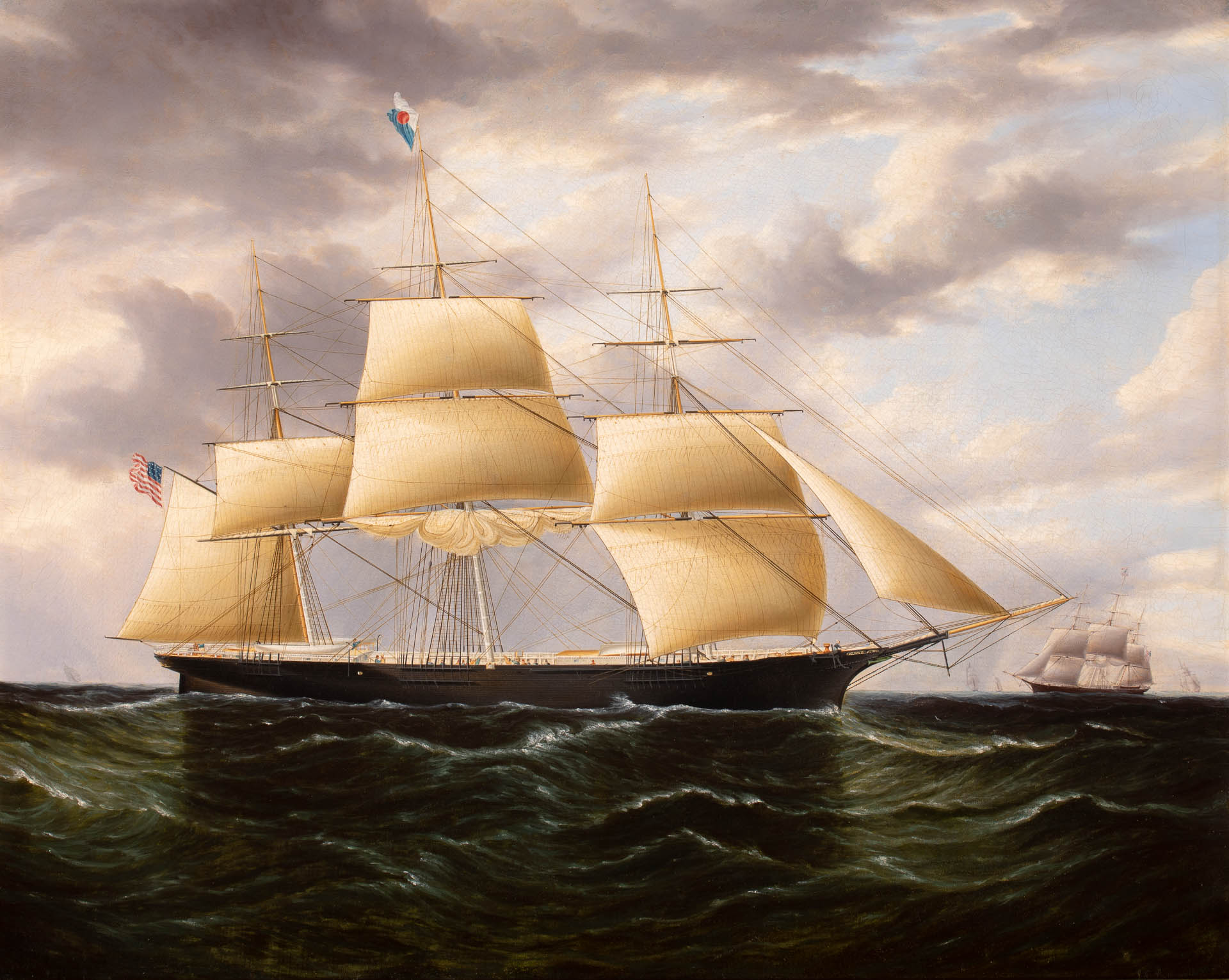

History

United States
- Owner: Sampson and Tappan
- Builder: Donald McKay of East Boston, Massachusetts
- Launched: 1851
- Fate: Wrecked, 1858

General characteristics
- Type: Clipper
- Tonnage: 1505
- Length: 196.6 feet (59.9 m)
- Beam: 27.1 feet (8.3 m)
- Draught: 22 feet (6.7 m)
- Propulsion: Sails
- Sail plan: Fully rigged

Flying Fish was a California clipper ship of the extreme type launched in 1851. Her figurehead was a green and gold flying fish. At full sail she could set 8,250 yards of canvas. The ship was wrecked in 1858 while coming out of Fuzhou with a cargo of tea leaves.
