= Northern Light (clipper) =

American clipper ship

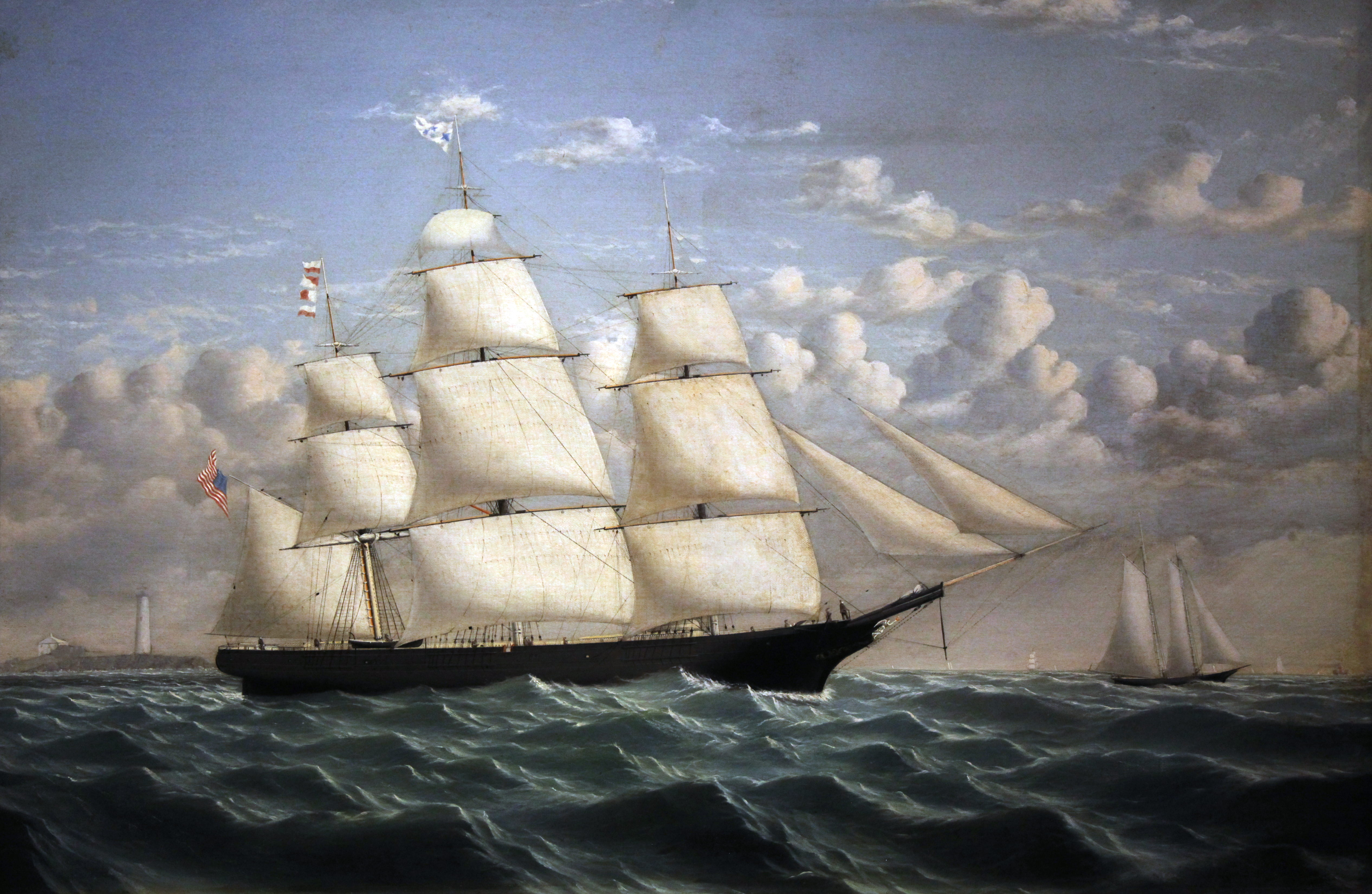
- Portrait painting of Northern Light, by William Bradford, 1853. On display at the MIT Museum in Cambridge, Massachusetts.

History

United States
- Name: Northern Light
- Builder: Brigs Brothers, South Boston, Massachusetts
- Launched: 25 September 1851
- Maiden voyage: 20 November 1851
- Fate: Abandoned at sea, 2 January 1862

General characteristics
- Type: Clipper
- Tonnage: 1,021
- Length: 180 ft (55 m)
- Beam: 36 ft (11 m)
- Draft: 21 ft 6 in (6.55 m)
- Propulsion: Sails

Northern Light was an American clipper ship. In 1853 it sailed from San Francisco, California to Boston, Massachusetts via Cape Horn with Captain Freeman Hatch at the helm in a record-setting 76 days, 6 hours. The record still stands for a single hull vessel. In 1993 the record was soundly broken by a multi-hull sailing vessel Great American II with no cargo. Sailing around Cape Horn (the southernmost tip of South America) is widely regarded as one of the most challenging routes in yachting, due to extreme weather, strong currents, and a historical reputation for mountainous seas and frequent severe storms.

== Construction ==
Northern Light was designed by Boston-based naval architect Samuel Hartt Pook and built by the Briggs Brothers in South Boston in 1851. The ship was 1,021 tons register and it measured 180 feet (55 m) long, 36 feet (11 m) wide, and 21 feet 6 inches (6.55 m) deep.

== 1853 voyage ==
Northern Light left Boston for San Francisco on October 29, 1852, under the command of Captain Freeman Hatch of Eastham, Massachusetts. The return journey was part of a competition with another clipper, Contest, bound for New York.

Contest departed San Francisco for New York on March 12, 1853. Northern Light sailed for Boston the next day. After 38 days Northern Light came within sight of Contest off Cape Horn. Northern Light′s crew signalled and overtook their rival.

Northern Light reached Boston Light on May 29, 1853, after 76 days, 5 hours, arriving in Boston an hour later, two days ahead of Contest′s arrival in New York. It was the shortest run on the 15,000-mile (24,000 km) San Francisco-to-Boston passage on record. It also beat previous around-Cape-Horn speed records of 84 days and 85 days held by the New York-based Comet and Flying Dutchman respectively. The Boston Post noted that Northern Light carried no cargo during the passage. The San Francisco-to-Boston sailing record by Northern Light still stands for a single-hull vessel; that feat, accomplished in a time with no electricity, and few navigation aids, no plastics, no synthetic materials for sails or lines, and neither accurate television or radio weather forecasts nor accurate charts and Global Positioning System navigation to demonstrate precise location, is unlikely ever to be repeated. Nevertheless, in 1993 the multi-hull 53-foot (16 m) trimaran Great American II broke the record and completed the passage in 69 days, 19 3/4 hours; it had capsized off San Francisco on an initial attempt.

== Later service ==
Northern Light made its first transatlantic voyage in 1861, sailing to Le Havre, France, and departed Le Havre bound for New York on December 25, 1861. On January 2, 1862, the ship collided with and sank the French brig Nouveau St. Jacques. Northern Light was abandoned at sea and was rescued by two vessels that brought their crew and captains to the British ports of Falmouth and Cowes.
