= Sailing card =

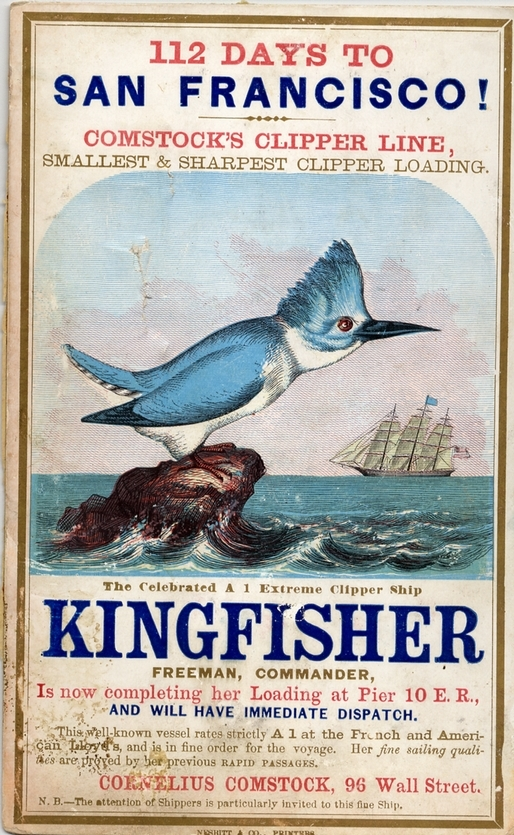
A sailing card for the clipper Kingfisher

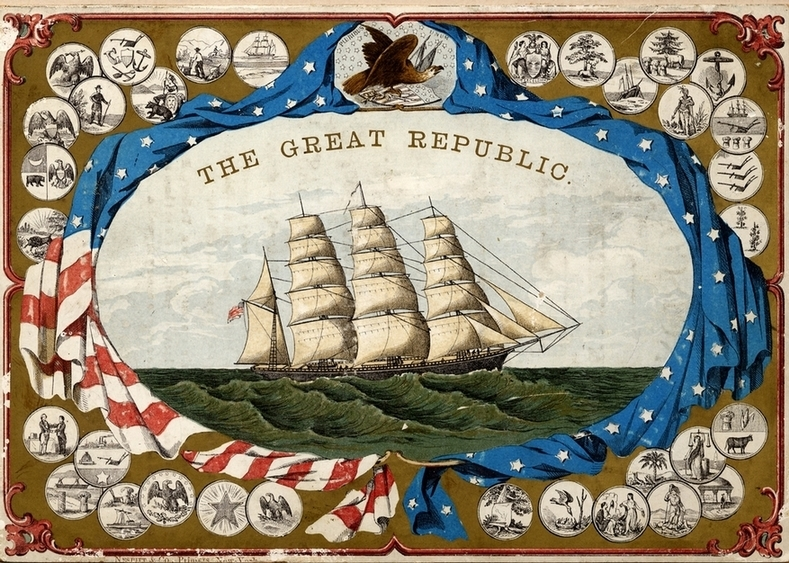
Sailing card for clipper ship Great Republic

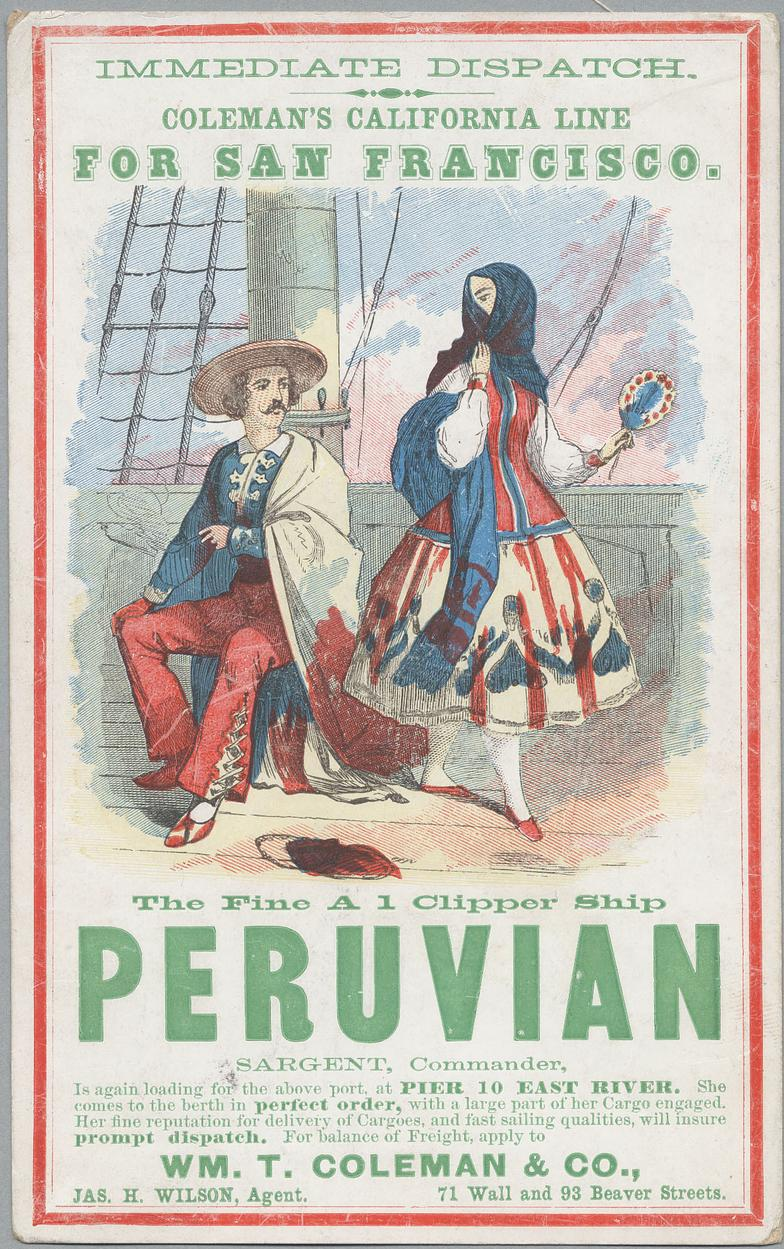
Sailing card advertising the clipper ship Peruvian

A sailing card is a printed advertisement with information on a ship and its sailing dates, especially clipper ships. Mystic Seaport in Mystic Connecticut has a collection of sailing cards. They were used from the mid-1850s in the U.S. to promote sailings and sometimes included engraved pictures and several colors and were displayed in the windows of port area businesses. Many were printed during the California Gold Rush era to attract voyagers and cargo in New York City and Boston. They were widely used until the 1880s and are now considered collectable.
