= Clipper =

Merchant sailing ship of the 19th century

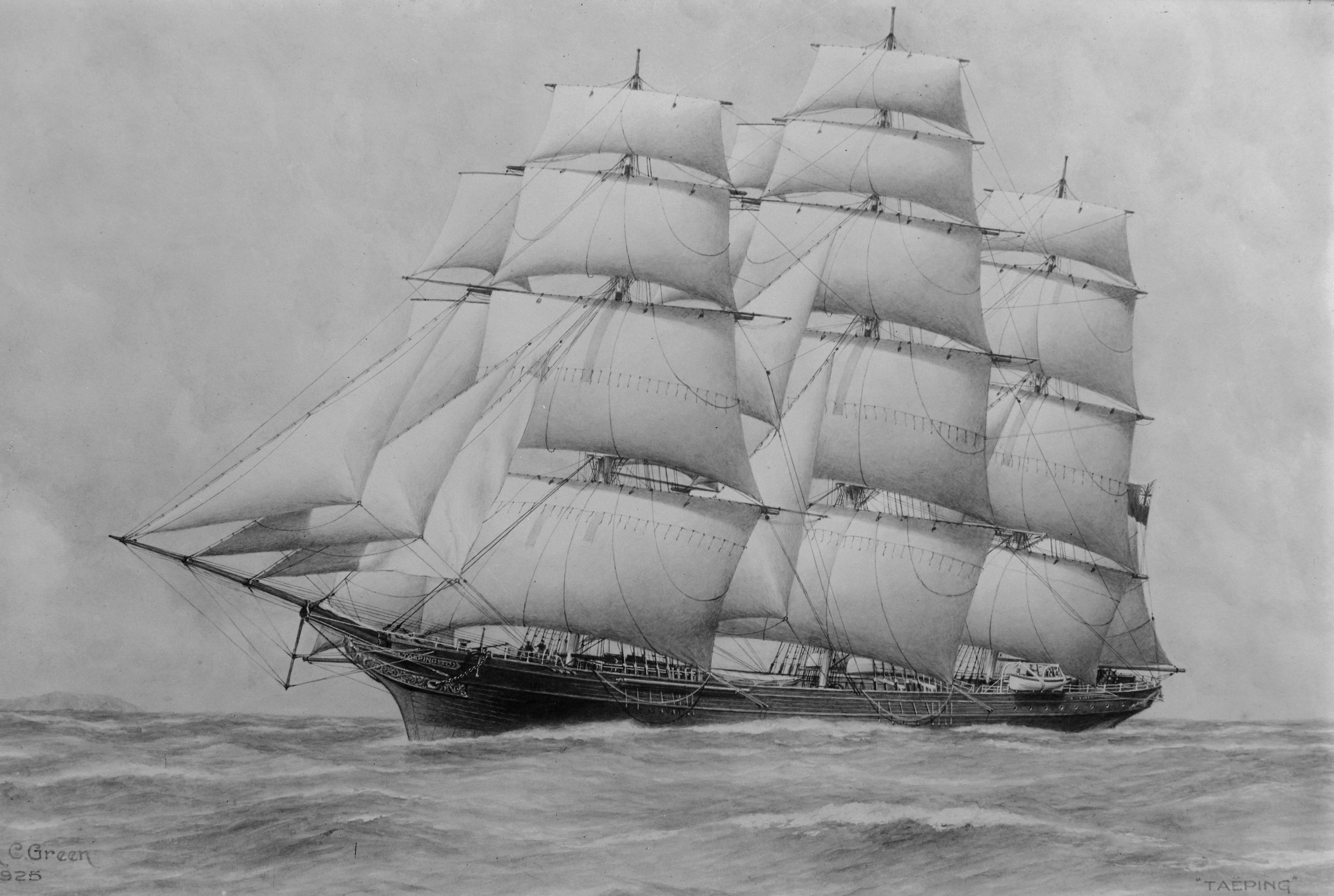
Taeping, a tea clipper built in 1863 by Robert Steele & Company.

A clipper was a type of mid-19th-century merchant sailing vessel, designed for speed. The term was also retrospectively applied to the Baltimore clipper, which originated in the late 18th century.

Clippers were generally narrow for their length, small by later 19th-century standards, could carry limited bulk freight, and had a large total sail area. "Clipper" does not refer to a specific sailplan; clippers may be schooners, brigs, brigantines, etc., as well as full-rigged ships. Clippers were mostly constructed in British and American shipyards, although France, Brazil, the Netherlands, and other nations also produced some. Clippers sailed all over the world, primarily on the trade routes between the United Kingdom and China, in transatlantic trade, and on the New York-to-San Francisco route around Cape Horn during the California gold rush. Dutch clippers were built beginning in the 1850s for the tea trade and passenger service to Java.

The boom years of the clipper era began in 1843 in response to a growing demand for faster delivery of tea from China and continued with the demand for swift passage to gold fields in California and Australia beginning in 1848 and 1851, respectively. The era ended with the opening of the Panama Railroad in 1855 and the Suez Canal in 1869.

== Origin and usage of "clipper" ==
The etymological origin of the word clipper is uncertain, but is believed to be derived from the English language verb "to clip", which at the time meant "to run or fly swiftly".

The first application of the term "clipper", in a nautical sense, is likewise uncertain. The type known as the Baltimore clipper originated at the end of the 18th century on the eastern seaboard of the United States. At first, these fast sailing vessels were referred to as "Virginia-built" or "pilot-boat model", with the name "Baltimore-built" appearing during the War of 1812. In the final days of the slave trade (circa 1835–1850) – just as the type was dying out – the term, Baltimore clipper, came into frequent use. The common retrospective application of the word "clipper" to this type of vessel has caused confusion.

The Oxford English Dictionary's earliest quote (referring to the Baltimore clipper) is from 1824. The dictionary cites Royal Navy officer and novelist Frederick Marryat as using the term in 1830. (Note: Marryat is generally considered by maritime historians to be a reliable source on nautical matters from his time.) British newspaper usage of the term can be found as early as 1832 and in shipping advertisements from 1835. A US court case of 1834 has evidence that discusses a clipper being faster than a brig.

== Definitions ==
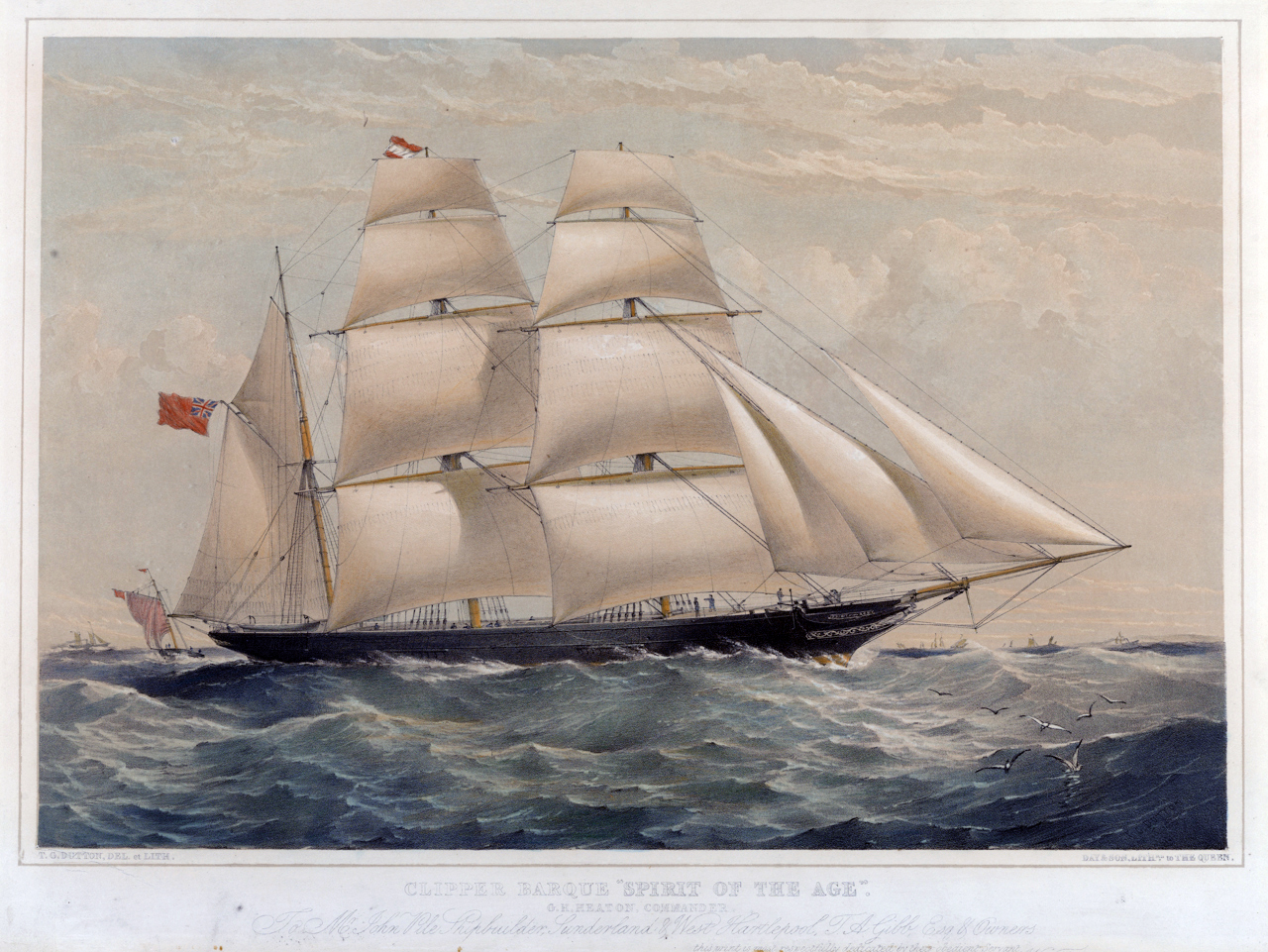
Clipper barque Spirit of the Age 1854 by T. G. Dutton

A clipper is a sailing vessel designed for speed, a priority that takes precedence over cargo-carrying capacity or building or operating costs. It is not restricted to any one rig (while many were fully rigged ships, others were barques, brigs, or schooners), nor was the term restricted to any one hull type. Howard Chapelle lists three basic hull types for clippers. The first was characterised by the sharp deadrise and ends found in the Baltimore clipper. The second was a hull with a full midsection and modest deadrise, but sharp ends – this was a development of the hull form of transatlantic packets. The third was more experimental, with deadrise and sharpness being balanced against the need to carry a profitable quantity of cargo. A clipper carried a large sail area and a fast hull; by the standards of any other type of sailing ship, a clipper was greatly over-canvassed. The last defining feature of a clipper, in the view of maritime historian David MacGregor, was a captain who had the courage, skill, and determination to get the fastest speed possible out of her.

=== Hull shape ===
In assessing the hull of a clipper, different maritime historians use different criteria to measure "sharpness", "fine lines" or "fineness", a concept which is explained by comparing a rectangular cuboid with the underwater shape of a vessel's hull. The more material one has to carve off the cuboid to achieve the hull shape, the sharper the hull. Ideally, a maritime historian would be able to look at either the block coefficient of fineness or the prismatic coefficient (Note: The block coefficient of fineness is a mathematical measure of sharpness used by naval architects, which compares the hull with a hypothetical block equal in length, breadth, and height to the immersed part of the hull. The prismatic coefficient makes a similar comparison to a prism with the immersed hull's dimensions, and is considered to the best indicator of potential speed. The lower the coefficient, the more material has to be removed from the hypothetical cuboid. Many commercial sailing vessels are unlikely to have had a prismatic coefficient less than 0.57.) of various clippers, but measured drawings or accurate half models may not exist to calculate either of these figures. An alternative measure of sharpness for hulls of a broadly similar shape is the coefficient of underdeck tonnage, as used by David MacGregor in comparing tea clippers. This could be calculated from the measurements taken to determine the registered tonnage, so can be applied to more vessels.

An extreme clipper has a hull of great fineness, as judged either by the prismatic coefficient, the coefficient of underdeck tonnage, or some other technical assessment of hull shape. This term has been misapplied in the past, without reference to hull shape. As commercial vessels, these are totally reliant on speed to generate a profit for their owners, as their sharpness limits their cargo-carrying capacity.

A medium clipper has a cargo-carrying hull that has some sharpness. In the right conditions and with a capable captain, some of these achieved notable quick passages. They were also able to pay their way when the high freight rates often paid to a fast sailing ship were not available (in a fluctuating market).

The term "clipper" applied to vessels between these two categories. They often made passages as fast as extreme clippers, but had less difficulty in making a living when freight rates were lower.

== History ==
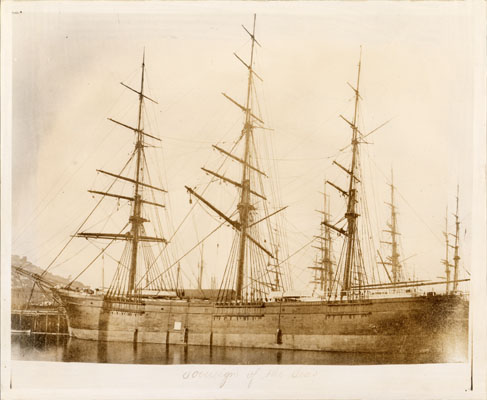
Sovereign of the Seas set the record for world's fastest sailing ship in 1854.

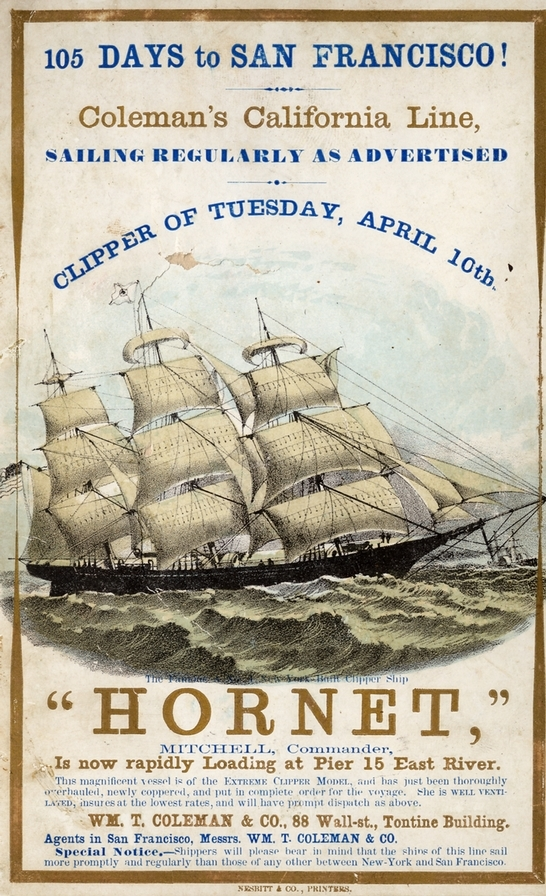
Hornet – an American clipper ship of the 1850s

The first ships to which the term "clipper" seems to have been applied were the Baltimore clippers, developed in the Chesapeake Bay before the American Revolution, and reached their zenith between 1795 and 1815. They were small, rarely exceeding 200 tons OM. Their hulls were sharp ended and displayed much deadrise. They were rigged as schooners, brigs, or brigantines. In the War of 1812, some were lightly armed, sailing under letters of marque and reprisal, when the type – exemplified by Chasseur, launched at Fells Point, Baltimore in 1814 – became known for her incredible speed; the deep draft enabled the Baltimore clipper to sail close to the wind. Clippers, running the British blockade of Baltimore, came to be recognized for speed rather than cargo space.

The type existed as early as 1780. A 1789 drawing of HMS Berbice (1780) – purchased by the Royal Navy in 1780 in the West Indies – represents the earliest draught of what became known as the Baltimore clipper.

Vessels of the Baltimore clipper type continued to be built for the slave trade, being useful for escaping enforcement of the British and American legislation prohibiting the trans-Atlantic slave trade. Some of these Baltimore clippers were captured when working as slavers, condemned by the appropriate court, and sold to owners who then used them as opium clippers – moving from one illegal international trade to another.

Ann McKim, built in Baltimore in 1833 by the Kennard & Williamson shipyard, is considered by some to be the original clipper ship. (Maritime historians Howard I. Chapelle and David MacGregor decry the concept of the "first" clipper, preferring a more evolutionary, multiple-step development of the type.) She measured 494 tons OM, and was built on the enlarged lines of a Baltimore clipper, with sharply raked stem, counter stern, and square rig. Although Ann McKim was the first large clipper ship ever constructed, she cannot be said to have founded the clipper ship era, or even that she directly influenced shipbuilders, since no other ship was built like her, but she may have suggested the clipper design in vessels of ship rig. She did, however, influence the building of Rainbow in 1845, the first extreme clipper ship.

In Aberdeen, Scotland, shipbuilders Alexander Hall and Sons developed the "Aberdeen" clipper bow in the late 1830s; the first was Scottish Maid launched in 1839. Scottish Maid, 150 tons OM, was the first British clipper ship. "Scottish Maid was intended for the Aberdeen-London trade, where speed was crucial to compete with steamships. The Hall brothers tested various hulls in a water tank and found the clipper design most effective. The design was influenced by tonnage regulations. Tonnage measured a ship's cargo capacity and was used to calculate tax and harbour dues. The new 1836 regulations measured depth and breadth with length measured at half midship depth. Extra length above this level was tax-free and became a feature of clippers. Scottish Maid proved swift and reliable and the design was widely copied." The earliest British clipper ships were built for trade within the British Isles (Scottish Maid was built for the Aberdeen to London trade). Then followed the vast clipper trade of tea, opium, spices, and other goods from the Far East to Europe, and the ships became known as "tea clippers".

From 1839, larger American clipper ships started to be built beginning with Akbar, 650 tons OM, in 1839, and including the 1844-built Houqua, 581 tons OM. These larger vessels were built predominantly for use in the China tea trade and known as "tea clippers". Then in 1845 Rainbow, 757 tons OM, the first extreme clipper, was launched in New York. These American clippers were larger vessels designed to sacrifice cargo capacity for speed. They had a bow lengthened above the water, a drawing out and sharpening of the forward body, and the greatest breadth further aft. Extreme clippers were built in the period 1845 to 1855.

In 1851, shipbuilders in Medford, Massachusetts, built what is sometimes called one of the first medium clippers, the Antelope, often called the Antelope of Boston to distinguish her from other ships of the same name. A contemporary ship-design journalist noted that "the design of her model was to combine large stowage capacity with good sailing qualities." Antelope was relatively flat-floored and had only an 8-inch deadrise at half-floor.

The medium clipper, though still very fast, could carry more cargo. After 1854, extreme clippers were replaced in American shipbuilding yards by medium clippers. The Flying Cloud was a clipper ship built in 1851 that established the fastest passage between New York and San Francisco within weeks of her launching, then broke her own records three years later, which stood at 89 days 8 hours until 1989. (The other contender for this "blue ribbon" title was the medium clipper Andrew Jackson – an unresolvable argument exists over timing these voyages "from pilot to pilot"). Flying Cloud was the most famous of the clippers built by Donald McKay. She was known for her extremely close race with the Hornet in 1853; for having a woman navigator, Eleanor Creesy, wife of Josiah Perkins Creesy, who skippered the Flying Cloud on two record-setting voyages from New York to San Francisco; and for sailing in the Australia and timber trades.

Clipper ships largely ceased being built in American shipyards in 1859 when, unlike the earlier boom years, only four clipper ships were built; a few were built in the 1860s.

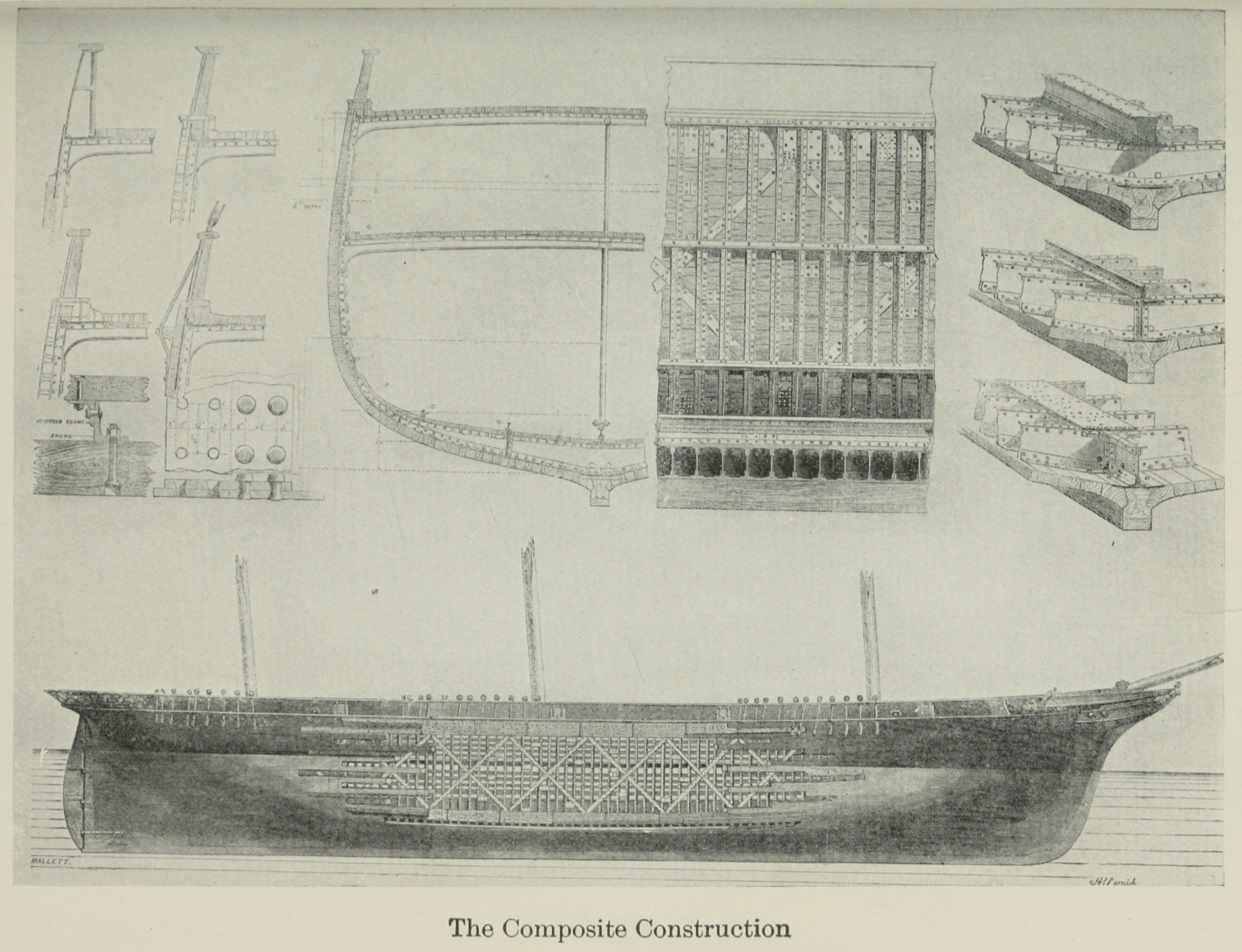
Composite Construction

British clipper ships continued to be built after 1859. From 1859, a new design was developed for British clipper ships that was nothing like the American clippers; these ships continued to be called extreme clippers. The new design had a sleek, graceful appearance, less sheer, less freeboard, lower bulwarks, and smaller breadth. They were built for the China tea trade, starting with Falcon in 1859, and continuing until 1870. The earlier ships were made from wood, though some were made from iron, just as some British clippers had been made from iron prior to 1859. In 1863, the first tea clippers of composite construction were brought out, combining the best of both worlds. Composite clippers had the strength of an iron hull framework but with wooden planking that, with properly insulated fastenings, could use copper sheathing without the problem of galvanic corrosion. Copper sheathing prevented fouling and teredo worm, but could not be used on iron hulls. The iron framework of composite clippers was less bulky and lighter, so allowing more cargo in a hull of the same external shape.

After 1869, with the opening of the Suez Canal that greatly advantaged steam vessels (see Decline below), the tea trade collapsed for clippers. From the late 1860s until the early 1870s, the clipper trade increasingly focused on the Britain to Australia and New Zealand route, carrying goods and immigrants, services that had begun earlier with the Australian Gold Rush of the 1850s. British-built clipper ships and many American-built, British-owned ships were used. Even in the 1880s, sailing ships were still the main carriers of cargo between Britain, and Australia and New Zealand. This trade eventually became unprofitable, and the ageing clipper fleet became unseaworthy.

=== Opium clippers ===
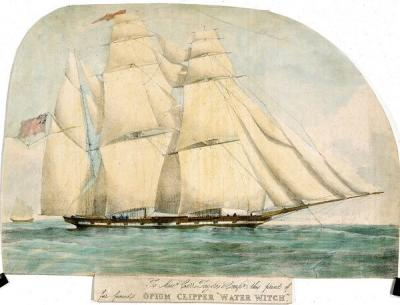
"Opium clipper" Water Witch, a British barque built in 1831

Before the early 18th century, the East India Company paid for its tea mainly in silver. When the Chinese emperor chose to embargo European-manufactured commodities and demand payment for all Chinese goods in silver, the price rose, restricting trade. The East India Company began to produce opium in India, something desired by the Chinese as much as tea was by the British. This had to be smuggled into China on smaller, fast-sailing ships, called "opium clippers". Some of these were built specifically for the purpose – mostly in India and Britain, such as the 1842-built Ariel, 100 tons OM. Some fruit schooners were bought for this trade, as were some Baltimore clippers.

== China clippers and the apogee of sail ==
Cutty Sark, a noted British clipper

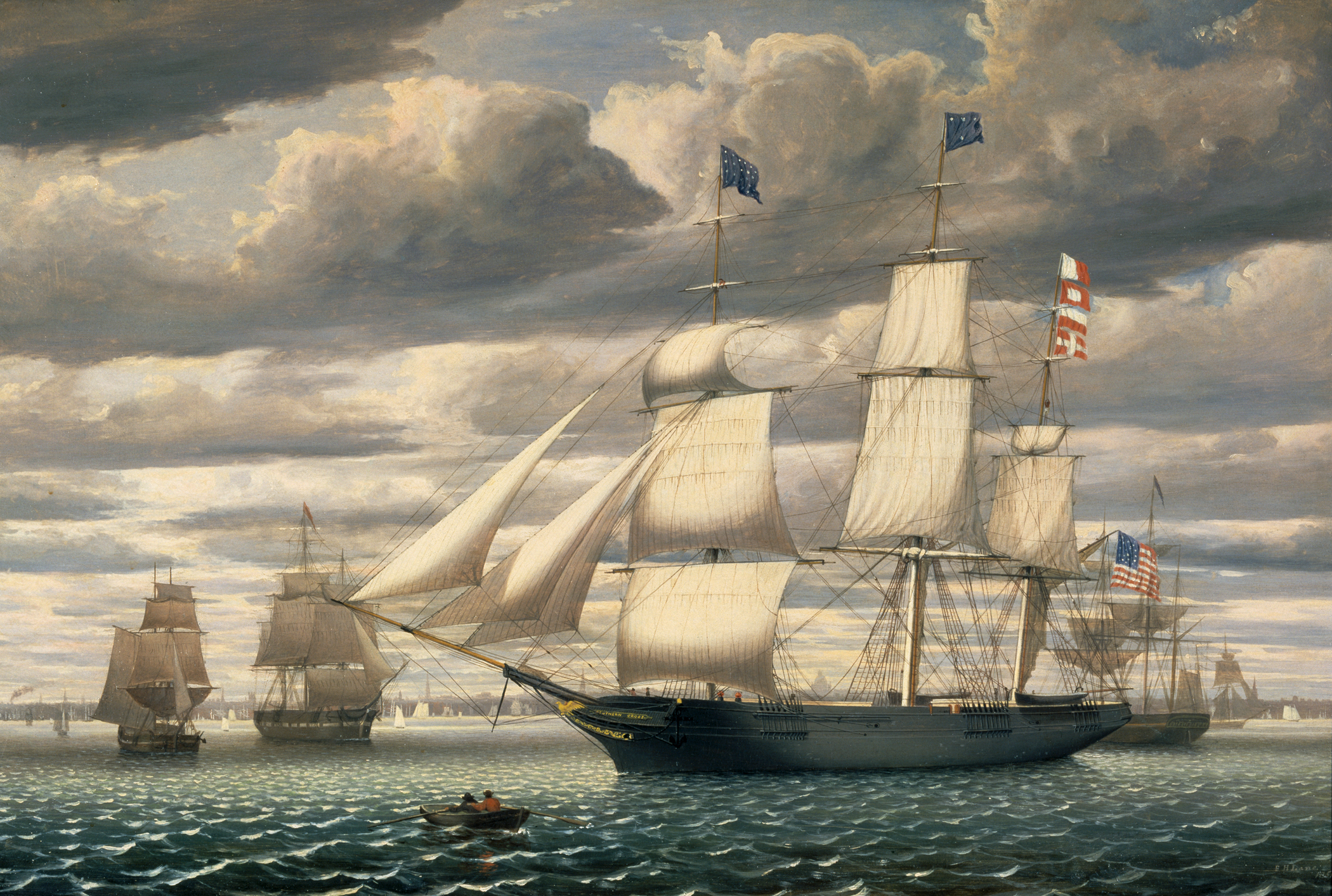
Clipper ship Southern Cross leaving Boston Harbor, 1851, by Fitz Hugh Lane

Among the most notable clippers were the China clippers, also called tea clippers, designed to ply the trade routes between Europe and the East Indies. The last example of these still in reasonable condition is Cutty Sark, preserved in dry dock at Greenwich, United Kingdom. Damaged by fire on 21 May 2007 while undergoing conservation, the ship was permanently elevated 3.0 m above the dry dock floor in 2010 as part of a plan for long-term preservation.

Clippers were built for seasonal trades such as tea, where an early cargo was more valuable, or for passenger routes. One passenger ship survives, the City of Adelaide designed by William Pile of Sunderland. The fast ships were ideally suited to low-volume, high-profit goods, such as tea, opium, spices, people, and mail. The return could be spectacular. The Challenger returned from Shanghai with "the most valuable cargo of tea and silk ever to be laden in one bottom". Competition among the clippers was public and fierce, with their times recorded in the newspapers.

The last China clippers had peak speeds over 16 knots (30 km/h), but their average speeds over a whole voyage were substantially less. The joint winner of the Great Tea Race of 1866 logged about 15,800 nautical miles on a 99-day trip. This gives an average speed slightly over 6.6 knots (12.2 km/h). The key to a fast passage for a tea clipper was getting across the China Sea against the monsoon winds that prevailed when the first tea crop of the season was ready. These difficult sailing conditions (light and/or contrary winds) dictated the design of tea clippers. The US clippers were designed for the strong winds encountered on their route around Cape Horn.

Donald McKay's Sovereign of the Seas reported the highest speed ever achieved by a sailing ship of the era, 22 knots (41 km/h), made while running her easting down to Australia in 1854. (John Griffiths' first clipper, the Rainbow, had a top speed of 14 knots.) Eleven other instances are reported of a ship's logging 18 knots (33 km/h) or over. Ten of these were recorded by American clippers. Besides the breath-taking 465-nautical-mile (861 km) day's run of the Champion of the Seas, 13 other cases are known of a ship's sailing over 400 nautical miles (740 km) in 24 hours. With few exceptions, though, all the port-to-port sailing records are held by the American clippers. The 24-hour record of the Champion of the Seas, set in 1854, was not broken until 1984 (by a multihull), or 2001 (by another monohull).

== Decline ==
A graph of the number of clippers built in the USA each year in the 1850s: This closely follows the economic situation.

The American clippers sailing from the East Coast to the California goldfields were working in a booming market. Freight rates were high everywhere in the first years of the 1850s. This started to fade in late 1853. The ports of California and Australia reported that they were overstocked with goods that had been shipped earlier in the year. This gave an accelerating fall in freight rates that was halted, however, by the start of the Crimean War in March 1854, as many ships were now being chartered by the French and British governments. The end of the Crimean War in April 1856 released all this capacity back on the world shipping markets – the result being a severe slump. The next year had the Panic of 1857, with effects on both sides of the Atlantic. The United States was just starting to recover from this in 1861 when the American Civil War started, causing significant disruption to trade in both Union and Confederate states.

As the economic situation deteriorated in 1853, American shipowners either did not order new vessels, or specified an ordinary clipper or a medium clipper instead of an extreme clipper. No extreme clipper was launched in an American shipyard after the end of 1854 and only a few medium clippers after 1860.

By contrast, British trade recovered well at the end of the 1850s. Tea clippers had continued to be launched during the depressed years, apparently little affected by the economic downturn. The long-distance route to China was not realistically challenged by steamships in the early part of the 1860s. No true steamer (as opposed to an auxiliary steamship) had the fuel efficiency to carry sufficient cargo to make a profitable voyage. The auxiliary steamships struggled to make any profit.

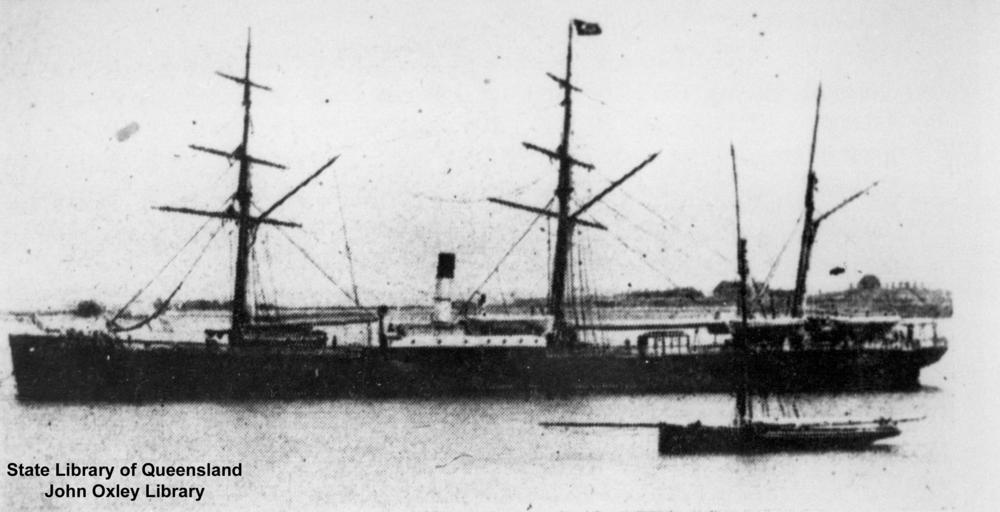
SS Agamemnon, the first steamer with the fuel efficiency to challenge sailing vessels on the long-distance route from Britain (or the East Coast US) to the China tea ports

The situation changed in 1866 when the Alfred Holt-designed and owned SS Agamemnon made her first voyage to China. Holt had persuaded the Board of Trade to allow higher steam pressures in British merchant vessels. Running at 60 psi instead of the previously permitted 25 psi, and using an efficient compound engine, Agamemnon had the fuel efficiency to steam at 10 knots to China and back, with coaling stops at Mauritius on the outward and return legs – crucially carrying sufficient cargo to make a profit.

In 1869, the Suez Canal opened, giving steamships a route about 3,000 nautical miles (5,600 km; 3,500 mi) shorter than that taken by sailing ships round the Cape of Good Hope. Despite initial conservatism by tea merchants, by 1871, tea clippers found strong competition from steamers in the tea ports of China. A typical passage time back to London for a steamer was 58 days, while the fastest clippers could occasionally make the trip in less than 100 days; the average was 123 days in the 1867–68 tea season. The freight rate for a steamer in 1871 was roughly double that paid to a sailing vessel. Some clipper owners were severely caught out by this; several extreme clippers had been launched in 1869, including Cutty Sark, Norman Court and Caliph. (Note: Caution is needed in interpreting Basil Lubbock's count of the number of extreme clippers launched in 1869. He states there were 25, but apparently without evidence such as having sight of reliable plans or half models. MacGregor stated that at least five of those in Lubbock's list were medium clippers, thereby calling into question the categorisation of the others.)

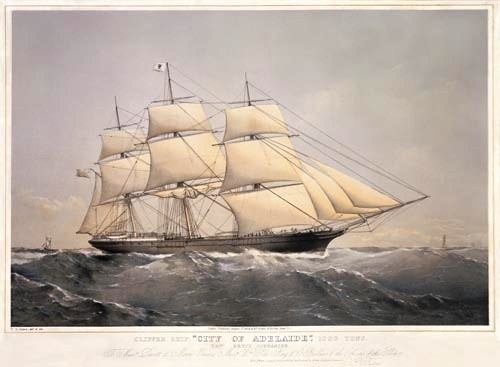
City of Adelaide (1864)

== Surviving ships ==
Of the many clipper ships built during the mid-19th century, only two are known to survive. The only intact survivor is Cutty Sark, which was preserved as a museum ship in 1954 at Greenwich for public display. The other known survivor is City of Adelaide; unlike Cutty Sark, she was reduced to a hulk over the years. She eventually sank at her moorings in 1991, but was raised the following year, and remained on dry land for years. Adelaide (or S.V. Carrick) is the older of the two survivors, and was transported to Australia for conservation.

== In popular culture ==
=== Sailing cards ===
Clipper ship sailing card for the Free Trade, printed by Nesbitt & Co., New York, early 1860s

Departures of clipper ships, mostly from New York and Boston to San Francisco, were advertised by clipper-ship sailing cards. These cards, slightly larger than today's postcards, were produced by letterpress and wood engraving on coated card stock. Most clipper cards were printed in the 1850s and 1860s, and represented the first pronounced use of color in American advertising art. Perhaps 3,500 cards survive. With their rarity and importance as artifacts of nautical, Western, and printing history, clipper cards are valued by both private collectors and institutions.

=== Basketball team ===
The Los Angeles Clippers of the National Basketball Association take their name from the type of ship. After the Buffalo Braves moved to San Diego, California in 1978, a contest was held to choose a new name. The winning name highlighted the city's connection with the clippers that frequented San Diego Bay. The team retained the name in its 1984 move to Los Angeles.

=== Airliners ===
The airline Pan Am named its aircraft beginning with the word 'Clipper' and used Clipper as its callsign. This was intended to evoke an image of speed and glamour.

=== Space probe ===
The Europa Clipper is a NASA probe that is currently on a mission to explore Jupiter and its moons; it was launched in 2024 and is expected to reach Jupiter in 2030.

== See also ==
- List of clipper ships
- Clipper route
- Packet boat
- Sail plan
- Windjammer
- Clipper card
- Europa Clipper

=== People associated with clipper ships ===
- List of people who sailed on clipper ships
- Joseph Warren Holmes
- Samuel Hartt Pook
- William Jardine
- Donald McKay
- John (or "Jock") "White Hat" Willis
