= List of people who sailed on clipper ships =

== Captains ==
- Garibaldi—Italian national hero. Captained a Peruvian clipper.
- Gemmill - Scotland, then USA
- William D. Gregory, captain of the clipper Tejuca, which sank during a hurricane in 1856.
- Joseph Warren Holmes—American sea captain who sailed around Cape Horn 84 times; command of clipper Seminole.
- Nathaniel Palmer—American seal hunter, explorer, sailing captain, and ship designer.
- Robert Waterman (sea captain)—Clipper captain famous for making record-breaking times and for being rough on his crews.

== Crew members ==
- Adelbert Ames—Mate on a clipper, seaman on his father's ship. Became a Union general in the Civil War, Reconstruction era politician, and Spanish–American War general.
- Hobart Bosworth—Cabin boy. Became a famous actor.
- David Bernard Clarke—2nd Mate on the Surrey Official No. 12873 and the Challenger No. 10707 and 1st Mate on the Red Deer No. 47387.
- Richard Henry Dana, author of Two Years Before the Mast
- Michael Healy—Cabin boy on a clipper. Became the first African-American to command a ship of the United States government.
- Benjamin Cheever Howard—Mate on Witchcraft, Golden Fleece, & Rising Son. Letters written from clippers at Bancroft Library & Peabody Essex Museum. Early San Francisco businessman (Howard & Pool).
- Edmund Rice—Apprentice to a clipper captain. Became a Brigadier General in the Union Army during the Civil War.
- Alan Villiers, seaman and writer.

== Passengers ==
=== Travellers ===
- Charles Keeler—American author, adventure, poet, naturalist and advocate for the arts, particularly architecture. Traveled around Cape Horn on the clipper Charmer in 1893.
- Sara Delano Roosevelt—Mother of Franklin Delano Roosevelt. Voyage to China at age eleven on the Surprise, with her mother and six brothers and sisters.
- Corliss P. Stone—Elected Mayor of Seattle, 1872. Arrived on the West Coast on the clipper ship Archer.

=== Missionaries to China ===
- Otis Gibson and Elizabeth Chamberlain Gibson. Sailed on a clipper for a mission to China a few months after their marriage.
- James Joseph Meadows—One of the first missionaries of the China Inland Mission.
- Hudson Taylor—Protestant missionary, founder of the China Inland Mission. Spent 51 years in China.
