= Carrier Dove (clipper) =

1855 sailboat

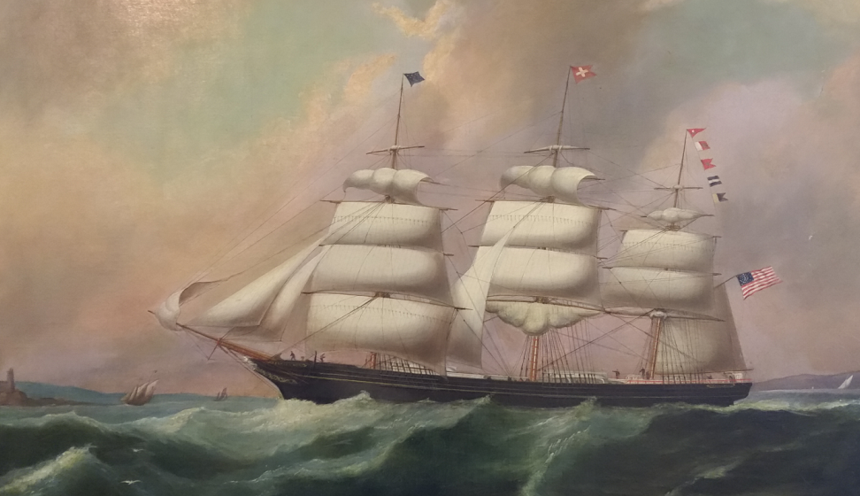
- Carrier Dove

History

United States
- Name: Carrier Dove
- Owner: Montell and Company, Baltimore, MD
- Builder: James Abraham, Baltimore, MD
- Launched: 1855
- Owner: 1863, Trask & Dearborn; sold at auction in New York in 1863 for $67,000; 1868, Union Navigation Company; 1870, J.D. Fish & Co.; 1875, John W. Elwell & Co.
- Fate: Wrecked March 3, 1876

General characteristics
- Class & type: Medium clipper
- Tons burthen: 1694 or 1545 tons
- Length: 220 ft (67 m); 207 ft. 8 in.
- Beam: 42 ft (13 m),
- Draft: 24 ft (7.3 m),

Carrier Dove was an 1855 medium clipper. She was one of two well-known clippers launched in Baltimore that year, the other being Mary Whitridge.

== Construction ==
Carrier Dove, like Andrew Jackson of Mystic, Mary Whitridge of Baltimore, and Flying Mist of Medford, was a medium clipper, built on a practical modification of clipper ship lines. She combined much of the speed of the sleek, early 1850s extreme clippers with the larger cargo capacity of the fuller-bottomed traditional packet ships.

== Voyages ==
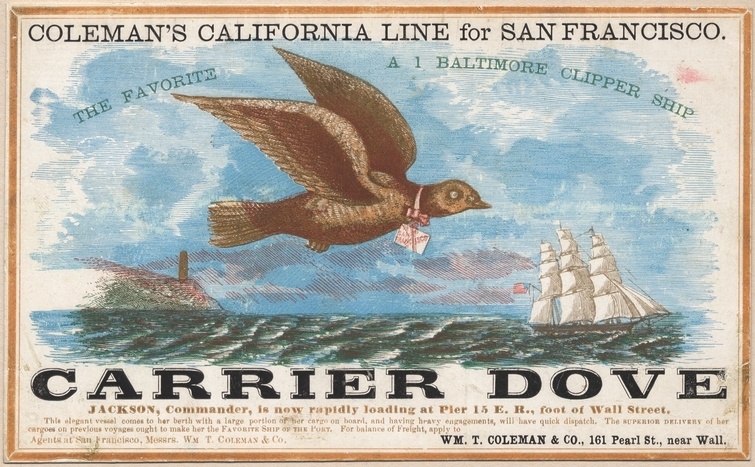
sailing card

Carrier Dove was dismasted in a hurricane just eight days out of New York City on her maiden voyage to San Francisco in 1855. Nevertheless, she made it to Rio de Janeiro on November 9, in 55 days. She remained in Rio for two months for repairs. The remainder of her trip around the Horn was more favorable, and she arrived in San Francisco on April 25, 1856, after a voyage of 98 days.

Her voyage from New York to San Francisco in 1860 under Captain Montell was more fortunate, and she arrived in 127 days.

In 1862, she took a cargo of wheat from San Francisco to Queenstown, Australia, in 124 days.

== Fast passages ==
Liverpool to Melbourne, 78 days, in 1858. Melbourne to Valparaíso, 30 or 32 days, under Captain Theodore Corner, very close to the record.

== Locomotive transport ==
Carrier Dove left New York on November 2, 1863, carrying San Francisco & San Jose Locomotive No. 4, and arrived in San Francisco on May 20, 1864.

== Went ashore ==
In 1862, Carrier Dove sailed in the transatlantic trade under Captain Nash and Captain Jackson. She went ashore at Portmagee, County Kerry, in February 1863, but was repaired and auctioned to her former owners, Trask & Dearborn. Also in 1863, she "collided with another vessel in the Mersey" that year, requiring assistance from three steam-tugs.

In 1865, while en route from Shields, England, laden with coal and general cargo, she went ashore on Governors Island in New York Harbor, just outside her destination, New York City. Her cargo was taken the rest of the way to the wharves by lighter.

== Loss of the ship ==
Carrier Dove went ashore for the last time on Stone Horse Shoals, near Tybee, while on a voyage from Liverpool to Tybee, Philadelphia, and San Francisco, March 3, 1876. She was a total loss. Her crew survived.
