= Frank Nelaton Dodd =

American accountant

- Born: March 29, 1870; North Babylon, New York
- Died: January 9, 1943 (aged 72); Manhattan, New York
- Education: Peekskill Military Academy; Columbia University
- Spouses: Adele Sturges (m. 1898; div. 1912) Genevieve M. Cary (m. 1912; died 1923) Lillian Williams ()
- Children: 5

Frank Nelaton Dodd (March 29, 1870 – January 9, 1943) was an American accountant who served as secretary of the Metropolitan Opera and Real Estate Company for 42 years.

== Early life ==
Dodd was born on March 29, 1870, in North Babylon, New York. He was a son of Elizabeth (née Foster) Dodd (1842–1918) and Dr. Edward S. Dodd (1839–1908), a Civil War-era physician. His maternal grandfather was William Foster. His paternal grandparents were James E. Dodd and Mary E. (née Pettit) Dodd.

While their winter home was at 198 Washington Park in Brooklyn, the family had a 70-acre summer home in North Babylon known as Millfield. The estate had been in his family for two hundred years (as of 1935), however, the house was first built in 1891 and rebuilt after a devastating 1935 fire.

He was educated at the Peekskill Military Academy before attending Columbia University.

== Career ==
After graduating from Columbia, Dodd became a certified public accountant in 1896. A "brilliant linguist," he spoke several languages fluently, including Japanese. He was a member of the Columbia University Club, the Babylon Club, the Great South Bay Club, and Theta Delta Chi fraternity as well as the Society of American Magicians. He served as president of the Millfield Realty Company and as a director of the Babylon National Bank and the Bowery Savings Bank.

Dodd retired in 1940 when the Metropolitan Opera and Real Estate Company sold the Metropolitan Opera building to the Metropolitan Opera Association.

== Personal life ==
Dodd was married three times and had five children, four with his second wife and one with his third wife. On June 1, 1898, Dodd was first married to heiress Adele Sturges (1872–1930), a daughter of Sarah (née Trask) Sturges and Peter D. Sturges. Adele was a granddaughter, and heiress, of New York real estate investor Benjamin H. Trask. She divorced him in 1912 after discovering he had an affair with Genevieve M. Cary (1881–1923), the daughter of their neighbor Daniel Cary. After the divorce, Adele married Bainbridge Percy Clark, the first witness in their divorce action, and he married Genevieve in 1912. They had two sons and four daughters. After her death in 1923, he married Lillian Williams, with whom he had:

- Stanley Foster Dodd (1926–2018), a lawyer.

Dodd, who maintained an apartment at the Hotel Lucerne on the Upper West Side, died at St. Luke's Hospital in New York on January 9, 1943. He was survived by five children, three sons and two daughters. He was buried at the Babylon Rural Cemetery.
