= Joseph Warren Holmes =

- Born: April 1, 1824; Mystic, Connecticut, U.S.
- Died: December 12, 1912 (aged 88); Mystic, Connecticut, U.S.
- Occupation: Sea captain

Captain Joseph Warren Holmes (April 1, 1824 – December 12, 1912) was an American sea captain noted for sailing around Cape Horn 84 times and Cape of Good Hope 14 times without a shipwreck or loss of a crewman. He had a 63-year career at sea, including 55 commanding clipper ships and others. He was the captain of more voyages around Cape Horn than anyone else.

== Early life ==
Joseph Warren Holmes was born on April 1, 1824, in Mystic, Connecticut Joseph Warren Holmes's father was Jeremiah Holmes. Jeremiah Holmes was a part of the War of 1812 and at the time was well respected in Mystic, Connecticut.

== Ships under Holmes' command ==
Captain Holmes sailed as master on various ships in the course of his career, including four ships built in Mystic, Connecticut: the bark Frances, clipper Seminole, and ships Elisabeth F. Willets and Haze.

== Descendants ==
Joseph Warren Holmes married twice and had one son from his first marriage, Edwin Warren Holmes. His son married Mary O. Kennedy (of California) and he died in San Francisco in 1883. He did have a grandson, also named Edwin Warren Holmes that was born around 1882. There are no other known descendants.
