= Flying Cloud (clipper) =

Clipper

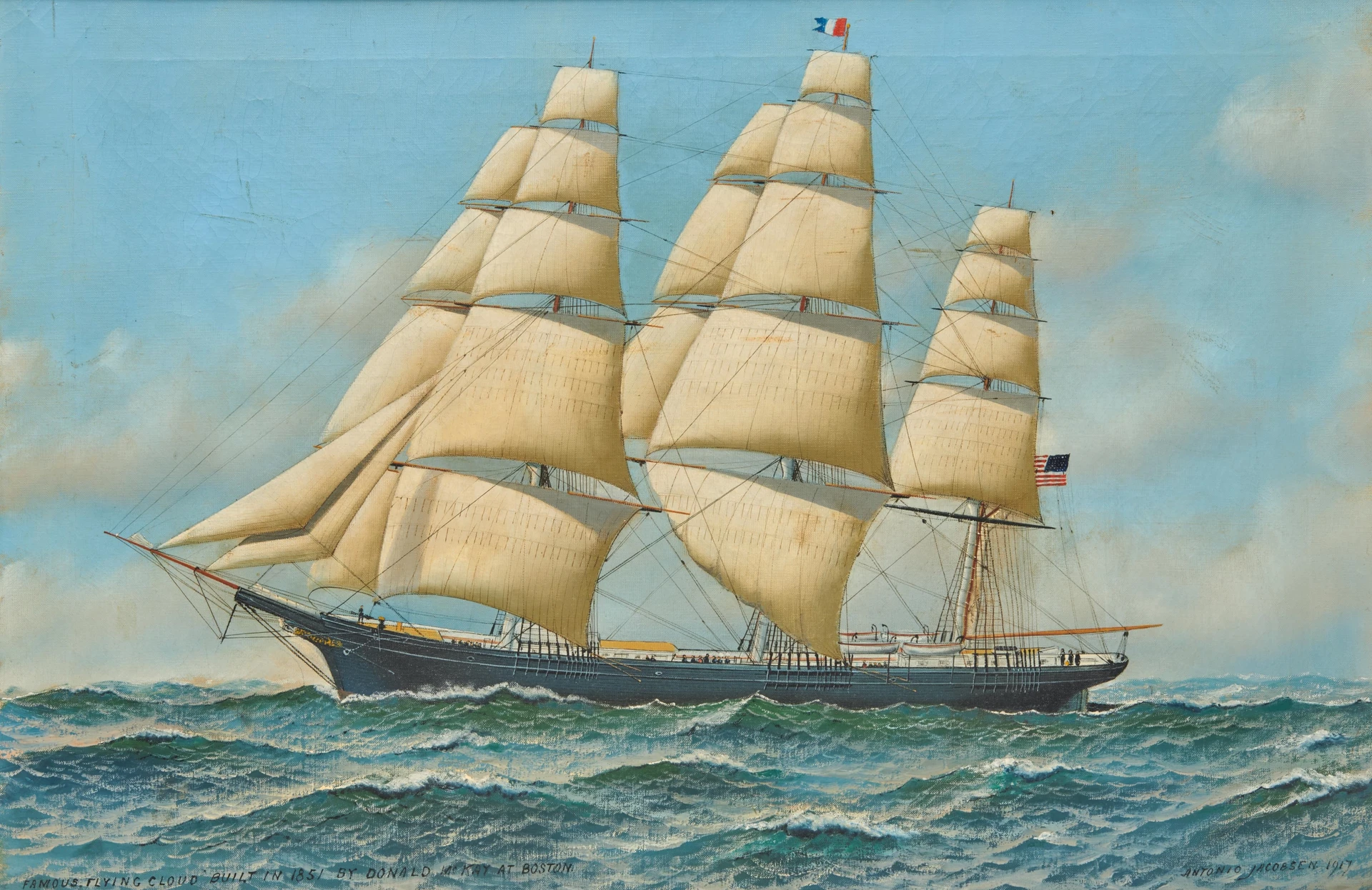
- 1917 oil-on-canvas painting of Flying Cloud by Antonio Jacobsen, based on an 1851 lithograph

History

United States
- Owner: Grinnell, Minturn & Co, New York
- Builder: Donald McKay of East Boston, Massachusetts
- Cost: $90,000
- Launched: 1851

United Kingdom
- Owner: James Baines & Co., Black Ball Line, Liverpool
- Acquired: 1862
- Owner: Harry Smith Edwards, South Shields, England
- Acquired: 19 April 1871
- Out of service: 1875
- Fate: Went ashore, Beacon Island Bar, Saint John, New Brunswick, 1874; burned for iron and copper fastenings

General characteristics
- Type: Clipper
- Tonnage: 1,782 tons (US); 1,098 NRT (UK)
- Length: 225 ft (69 m) LOD (US); 221.1 ft (67.4 m) Register Length (UK)
- Beam: 41 ft 8 in (12.70 m) (US); 40.2 ft (12.3 m) (UK)
- Depth: 21 ft 6 in (6.55 m)(US); 21.8 ft (6.6 m) (UK)
- Notes: US and UK measurements differ as measuring systems had slightly different rules.

Flying Cloud was a clipper ship that set the world's sailing record for the fastest passage between New York and San Francisco, 89 days 8 hours. The ship held this record for over 135 years, from 1854 to 1989.

Flying Cloud was the most famous of the clippers built by Donald McKay. She was known for her extremely close race with Hornet in 1853; for having a woman navigator, Eleanor Creesy, wife of Josiah Perkins Creesy who skippered Flying Cloud on two record-setting voyages from New York to San Francisco; and for sailing in the Australia and timber trades.

== Construction ==
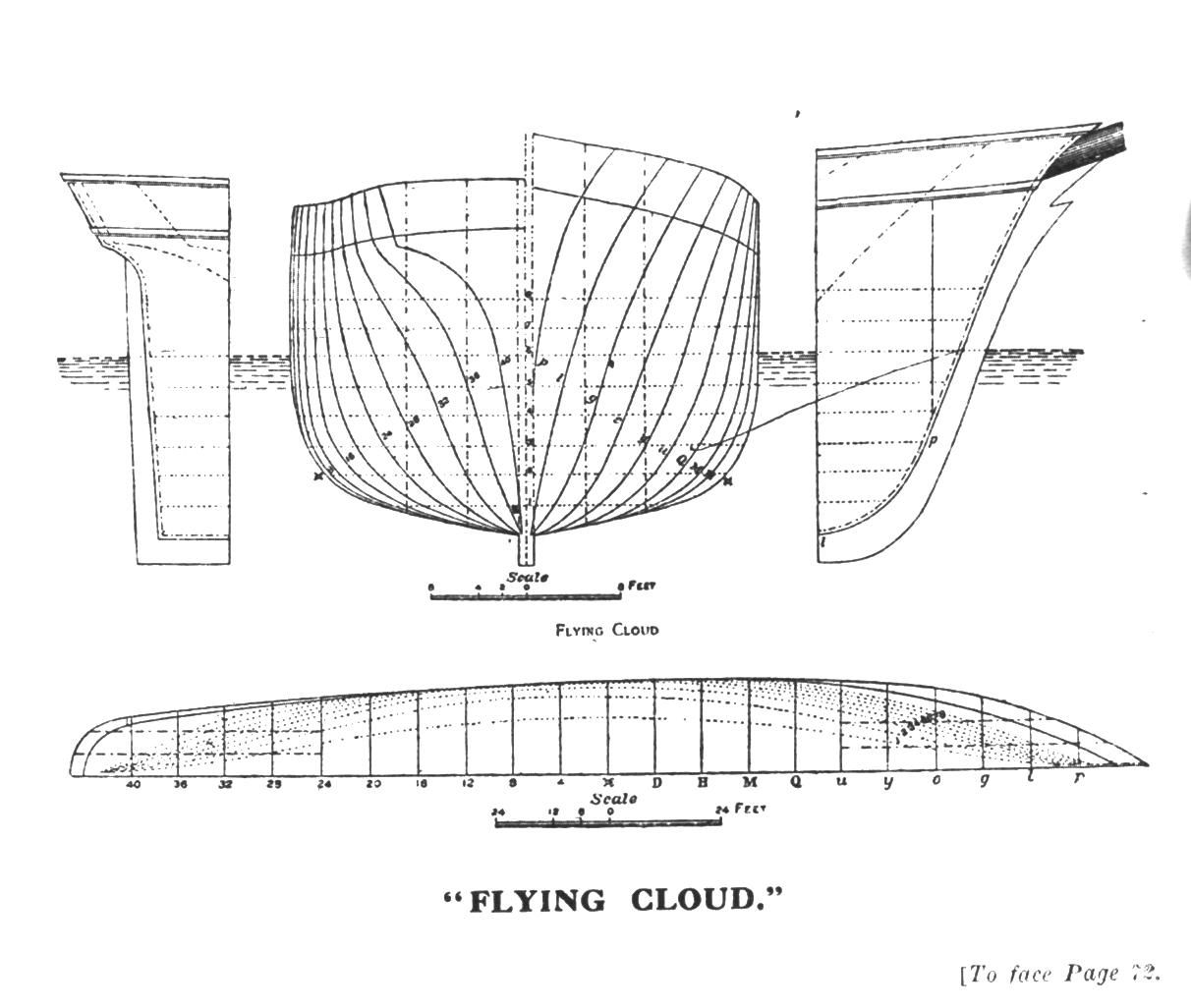
Lines of Flying Cloud

Flying Cloud was built in East Boston, Massachusetts, and intended for Enoch Train of Boston, who paid $50,000 for her construction. While still under construction, she was purchased by Grinnell, Minturn & Co., of New York, for $90,000, (~$2.69 million in 2024) which represented a huge profit for Train & Co.

A reporter for the Boston Daily Atlas of 25 April 1851 wrote, "If great length [235 ft.], sharpness of ends, with proportionate breadth [41 ft.] and depth, conduce to speed, the Flying Cloud must be uncommonly swift, for in all these she is great. Her length on the keel is 208 feet, on deck 225, and over all, from the knightheads to the taffrail, 235— extreme breadth of beam 41 feet, depth of hold 21½, including 7 feet 8 inches height of between-decks, sea-rise at half-floor 20 inches, rounding of sides 6 inches, and sheer about 3 feet." Flying Cloud is often called an extreme clipper, as are many of Donald McKay's ships, even though her deadrise was only 30 inches.

== Record voyage to San Francisco during Gold Rush ==
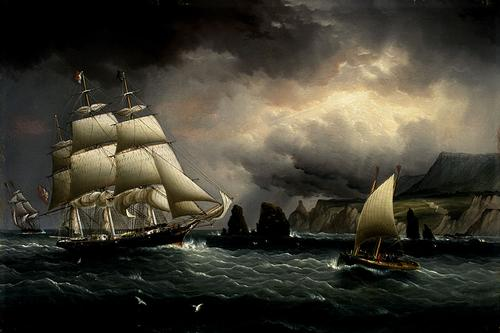
"The Clipper Ship Flying Cloud off the Needles, Isle of Wight 1859–1860"; painting by James E. Buttersworth

Within six weeks of her 1851 launch Flying Cloud sailed from New York, rounded Cape Horn and made San Francisco in 89 days, 21 hours under the command of Captain Josiah Perkins Creesy. In July, during the trip, she ran 284, 374 and 334 nautical miles, a total of 992 nautical miles over the three consecutive days. In 1854 she beat her own fastest by 13 hours, setting a record that stood until 1989 when a contemporary 60 ft racing sloop, Thursday's Child, completed the passage in 80 days, 20 hours.

In the early days of the California Gold Rush, it took more than 200 days for a ship to travel from New York to San Francisco, a voyage of more than 16,000 miles, but clipper ships quickly cut that time in half. Surprise had set a record of 91 days, 21 hours on 19 March 1851, but Flying Cloud caused a sensation later that year, cutting two days off the record, and beating the three month barrier. Three years later, in 1854, she sailed the passage faster yet, setting a record that lasted for 135 years.

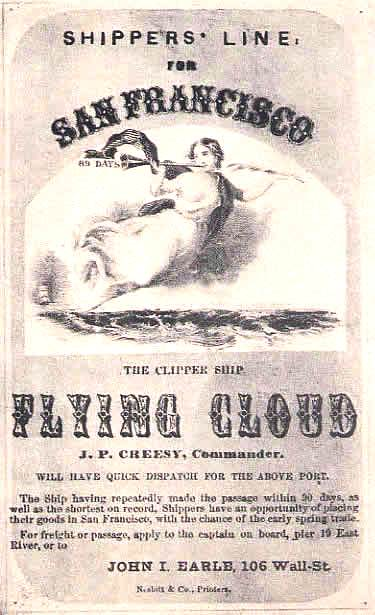
Clipper ships were in great demand during the California Gold Rush, this card for the fifth voyage to San Francisco

=== Flying Cloud vs. Andrew Jackson ===
In newspaper accounts of the day, the clipper Andrew Jackson was acclaimed as holding the record passage to San Francisco. After careful scrutiny of the logbooks, Cutler concludes that a case can be made for either Flying Cloud or Andrew Jackson holding the record.

Andrew Jackson holds the record for fastest passage pilot-to-pilot, arriving at the San Francisco pilot grounds in 89 days and 4 hours. Because Andrew Jackson spent all night between the Farallon Islands and the Golden Gate awaiting a harbor pilot, some will consider this figure as the appropriate indicator of fastest sailing performance around Cape Horn.

However, Flying Cloud holds the record time for a completed voyage from New York to San Francisco, 89 days 8 hours anchor-to-anchor.

== Woman navigator ==
Flying Cloud's achievement was remarkable under any terms. But, writes David W. Shaw, it was all the more unusual because her navigator was a woman, Eleanor Creesy, who had been studying oceanic currents, weather phenomena, and astronomy since her girlhood in Marblehead, Massachusetts. She was one of the first navigators to exploit the insights of Matthew Fontaine Maury, most notably the course recommended in his Sailing Directions. With her husband, ship captain Josiah Perkins Creesy, she logged many thousands of miles on the ocean, traveling around the world carrying passengers and goods. In the wake of their record-setting transit from New York to California, Eleanor and Josiah became instant celebrities. But their fame was short-lived and their story quickly forgotten. Josiah died in 1871 and Eleanor lived far from the sea until her death in 1900.

== Race with clipper Hornet in 1853 ==
Hornet had a two-day head start on Flying Cloud in their famous 1853 race. She left New York for San Francisco, 26 April 1853, with Flying Cloud departing two days later.

After the roughly 15,000-mile voyage around Cape Horn, both ships arrived in San Francisco harbor 106 days later at almost the same time, with Hornet sailing in just 45 minutes ahead of the Flying Cloud.

== British clipper to Australia and New Zealand, New Brunswick timber trade ==
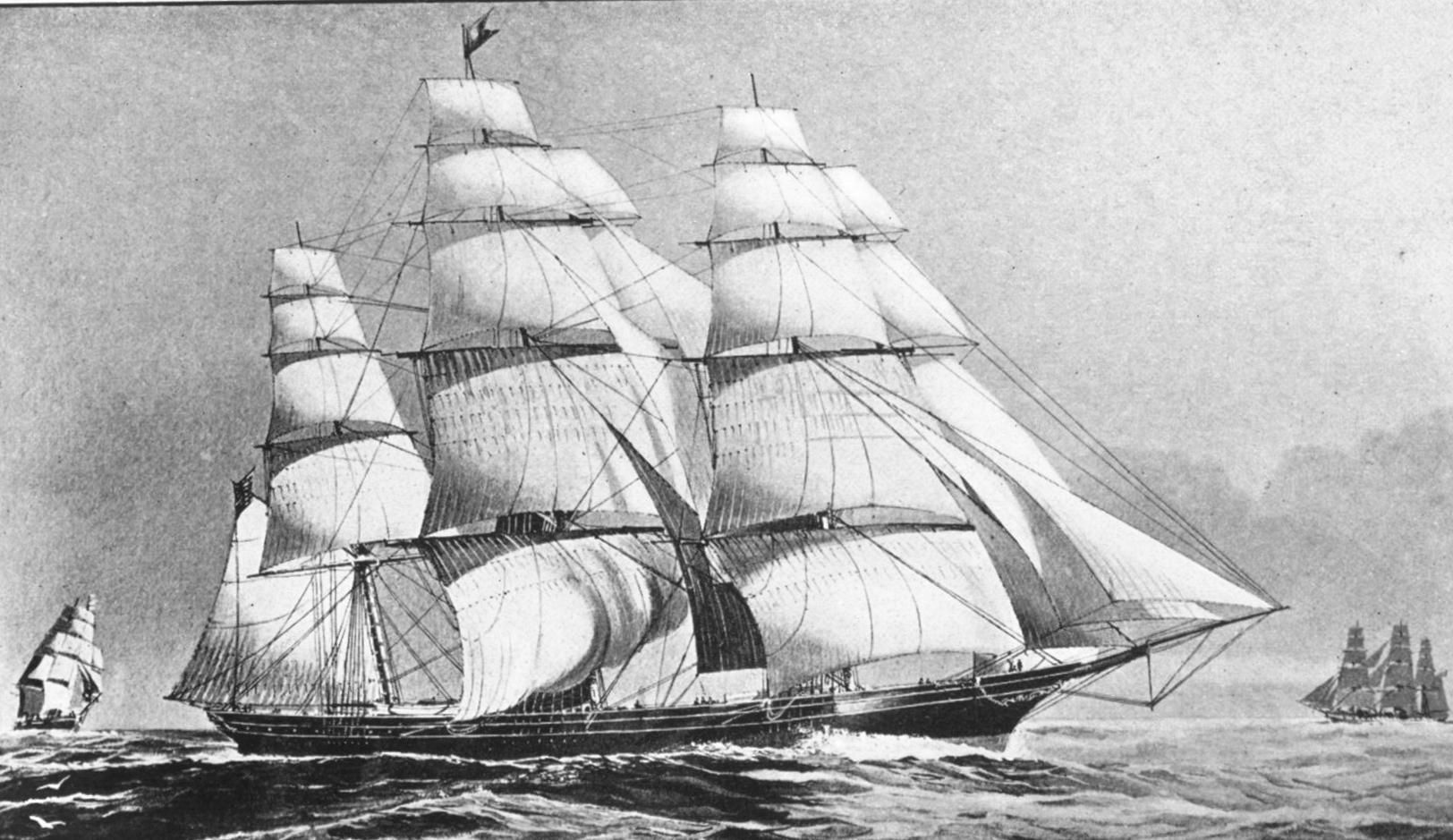
Depiction of Flying Cloud with a fuller sail configuration than in the Jacobsen painting above

In 1862, Flying Cloud was sold to the Black Ball Line, Liverpool, sailing under British colors without change of name, and was soon traveling between the mother country and Australia and New Zealand. Her latter years were spent in the log trade between Newcastle upon Tyne, England, and Saint John, New Brunswick, Canada.

== Loss of the ship ==
On 19 June 1874, Flying Cloud went aground on the Beacon Island bar, Saint John, New Brunswick. After she was refloated, it was discovered that her keel was broken. The following June she was burned for the scrap metal value of her copper and iron fastenings.

== Ballad ==
A well-known ballad about a ship named Flying Cloud tells the story of an Irishman who was pressed into sailing on the ship on a slaving voyage from Baltimore via Bermuda to West Africa, which led to another voyage as a pirate ship that resulted in the execution of the crew at Newgate. However, these events are nothing to do with the actual history of the clipper ship.

== Novels and books ==
- Lyon, Margaret; Reynolds, Flora Elizabeth (1992). The Flying Cloud, and her first passengers. Oakland, California: Mills College. OCLC 27204043.
- Shaw, David W. (2000). Flying Cloud: the true story of America's most famous clipper ship and the woman who guided her (1st ed.). New York: William Morrow. ISBN 0-688-16793-4.
- Sperry, Armstrong (2007). All Sail Set: A Romance of the Flying Cloud. Paw Prints. ISBN 978-1-4352-0042-5.
