= Benjamin H. Trask =

American merchant and real estate investor

Benjamin Ishi Hammett Trask (July 4, 1828 – January 11, 1897) was an American merchant and real estate investor.

== Early life ==
Trask was born on July 4, 1828, at Vineyard Haven on Martha's Vineyard. He was a son of Benjamin I. H. Trask (1800–1871) and Sarah Skiff (née Smith) Trask (1807–1878). He had two brothers, John George Whitwell Trask and Gustavus Dunham Smith Trask. His paternal grandfather was Dr. Benjamin Traski.

He was educated at the Tisbury Academy before he attended the Falmouth Seminary on Cape Cod.

== Career ==
He began his career as a clerk in the New York office of William Nelson, the agent of a line of New Orleans packets. At twenty-one, he became a member of the firm of Merritt & Trask, who were located at 28 South Street and in 1857, he established the shipping and commission merchant firm of Trask & Dearborn, including the clipper Carrier Dove. In 1864, he was elected president of the Union Navigation Company. He served in that role for two years before his retirement from the shipping business.

In 1866, Trask entered the real estate field and invested heavily in property along Fifth Avenue and in the neighborhood of Central Park. A firm believer in future growth and development of the twenty-third and twenty-fourth wards and owned significant property there. At the time of his death, his office was located at 115 Broadway in New York. He was also an investor in gas properties, including the East River Gas Company, the Equity Gas Company of Brooklyn and the Suffolk County Gas Company.

== Personal life ==
On November 9, 1848, Trask was married to Harriet N. Pinchbeck (1829–1898). Together, they were the parents of two daughters, only one who survived to adulthood:

- Sarah Skiff Smith Trask (1849–1915), who married Peter Demansk Sturges, son of James S. Sturges, in 1868.
- Clara Trask (1853–1853), who died in infancy.

Trask died of heart disease at his residence, 6 East 82nd Street, in January 1897. According to his obituary in The New York Times, "Trask held very pronounced views on funerals, believing that they should be only for the members of the family, and not for show." Because of that, and also of the serious illness of his wife, who had been confined to her bed for several months before his death, the funeral was private and limited to his relatives. He was buried at Woodlawn Cemetery, Bronx. His widow died a year and a half later on July 28, 1898.

=== Descendants ===
Through his daughter Sarah, he was a grandfather of Sadie Trask Sturges (1868–1915) and Adele Sturges (1872–1930), who married (and divorced) Frank Nelaton Dodd, and Bainbridge Percy Clark.
