= Hornet (clipper) =

1851 extreme clipper in San Francisco trade

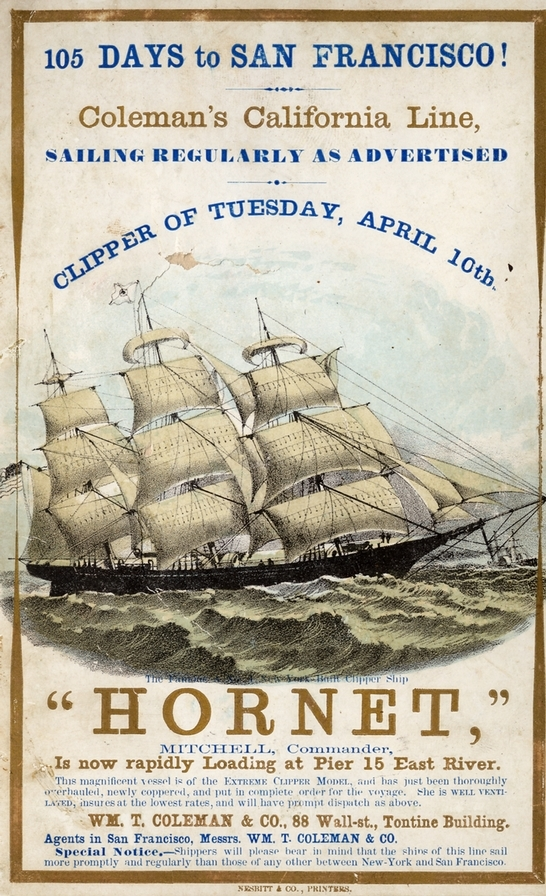

History

United States
- Name: Hornet
- Owner: Chamberlain & Phelps, New York.
- Ordered: Westervelt & MacKay, New York City
- Launched: June 20, 1851
- Fate: Burned and sank 3 May 1866

General characteristics
- Class & type: Extreme clipper
- Tons burthen: 1426 tons
- Length: 207 ft.
- Beam: 40 ft.
- Draft: 22 ft.

Hornet was an extreme clipper in the San Francisco trade, launched in 1851, and famous for its race with Flying Cloud.

== Race with Flying Cloud ==
Hornet left New York City for San Francisco, California on April 26, 1853, with Flying Cloud departing two days later.

After the roughly 15,000-nautical mile (27,780-km) voyage around Cape Horn, both ships arrived in San Francisco harbor 106 days later at almost the same time, with Hornet sailing in just 45 minutes ahead of Flying Cloud.

== Loss ==
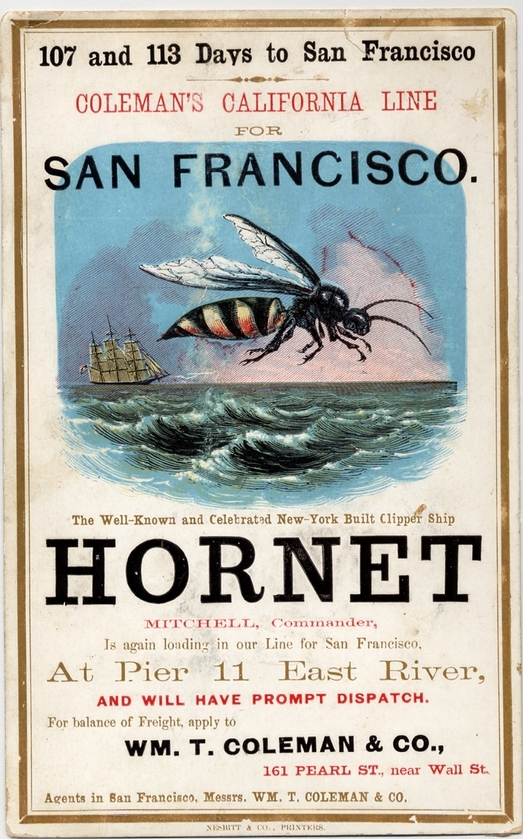

In 1866, Hornet left New York City bound for San Francisco under Captain Josiah A. Mitchell with a cargo of candles, case oil, and oil in barrels. During the voyage, she caught fire and sank in the Pacific Ocean on May 3, 1866. The crew left the ship in three open lifeboats. The captain's boat reached Hawaii after 43 days at sea on June 15, 1866, with 14 survivors aboard, but the two other boats disappeared. Mark Twain, on the islands as a special correspondent from the Sacramento Daily Union, interviewed several of the survivors and filed the first extensive report.

== Images ==
- Hornet clipper ship card
