= Eleanor Creesy =

American navigator

Eleanor Creesy (September 21, 1814 – 1900) was an American navigator, who was the wife of Josiah Perkins Creesy, skipper of the Flying Cloud which set the world's sailing record for the fastest passage between New York and San Francisco in 1851. They beat their own record three years later, and it remained a record until 1989.

== Early life and background ==
Creesy was born on September 21, 1814, in Marblehead, Massachusetts, to Joshua III and Eleanor Prentiss. She learned the craft of seafaring from her step-father and uncle, John Prentiss. John Prentiss married Eleanor's mother Eleanor after Joshua Prentiss died at sea in 1817. Prentiss, a master mariner, captained a ship called the Californian. Locals thought it peculiar that she was taught ship navigation by her father, at a time when women were rarely educated, let alone in a business dominated by men. Her dream was to marry a Captain and sail with him on his ship and, though she attracted many suitors as a young woman, she rejected their advances until she found a sailor.

Eleanor married Captain Josiah Creesy in 1841, and served him as a navigator aboard his ship. Around 1846 they began traveling on the Oneida, and had just returned from a trip to Shanghai, China when they sailed from New York in 1851.

== New York to San Francisco voyage ==
The Flying Cloud, kept in Boston Harbor, was the harbor's largest at the time, measuring 235 by 41 feet (72 m × 12 m) and weighing 1,782 tons. Its three masts held 21 sails, using some 30,000 square feet of sailcloth.

Eleanor and Josiah planned a trip from New York to San Francisco, to break the record. She read Matthew Fontaine Maury's detailed guide Sailing Directions, prior to the voyage in May 1851.

The Daily Alta California wrote in an article documenting the event on April 20, 1854: "[Eleanor Creesy's] skills are considered to be a major factor in the ship's safe and swift passages.”

== Later years ==
The Flying Cloud was laid down in 1857 due to poor business. Creesy and her husband were believed to have gone to sea aboard the Archer after his Civil War service ended, but they retired to a farm near Salem, Massachusetts. Josiah died in 1871; she survived him by 29 years.
