= Seminole (clipper) =

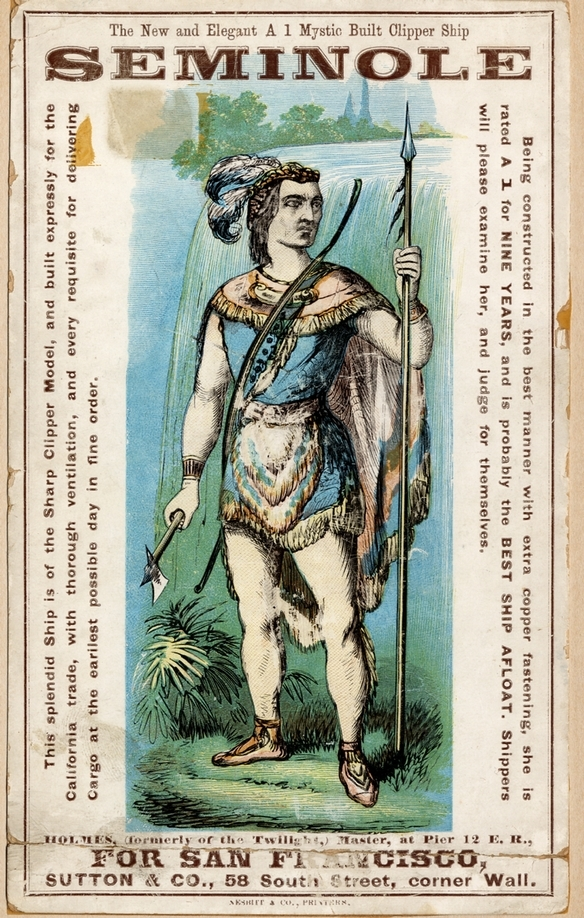

History

United States
- Name: Seminole
- Builder: Maxon & Fish, Mystic, CT
- Launched: 1865

Seminole was a later clipper ship, built by Maxon & Fish at Mystic, Connecticut, in 1865.

== Voyages ==
She was one of only two clipper ships in the post-Civil War period (1865–1900) to make a passage from an Atlantic port to San Francisco in less than one hundred days. Seminole arrived at San Francisco from New York on March 10, 1866, in 96 days. Glory of the Seas, “the last ship built by Donald McKay, made the same voyage, arriving at San Francisco, January 18, 1874, in 94 days."

== Delivery of locomotive to San Francisco ==
Seminole left New York on December 3, 1865, and arrived in San Francisco on March 11, 1866, of that after a voyage of 97 days, carrying Central Pacific locomotive CP 10.
