= Andrew Jackson (clipper) =

1855 clipper ship

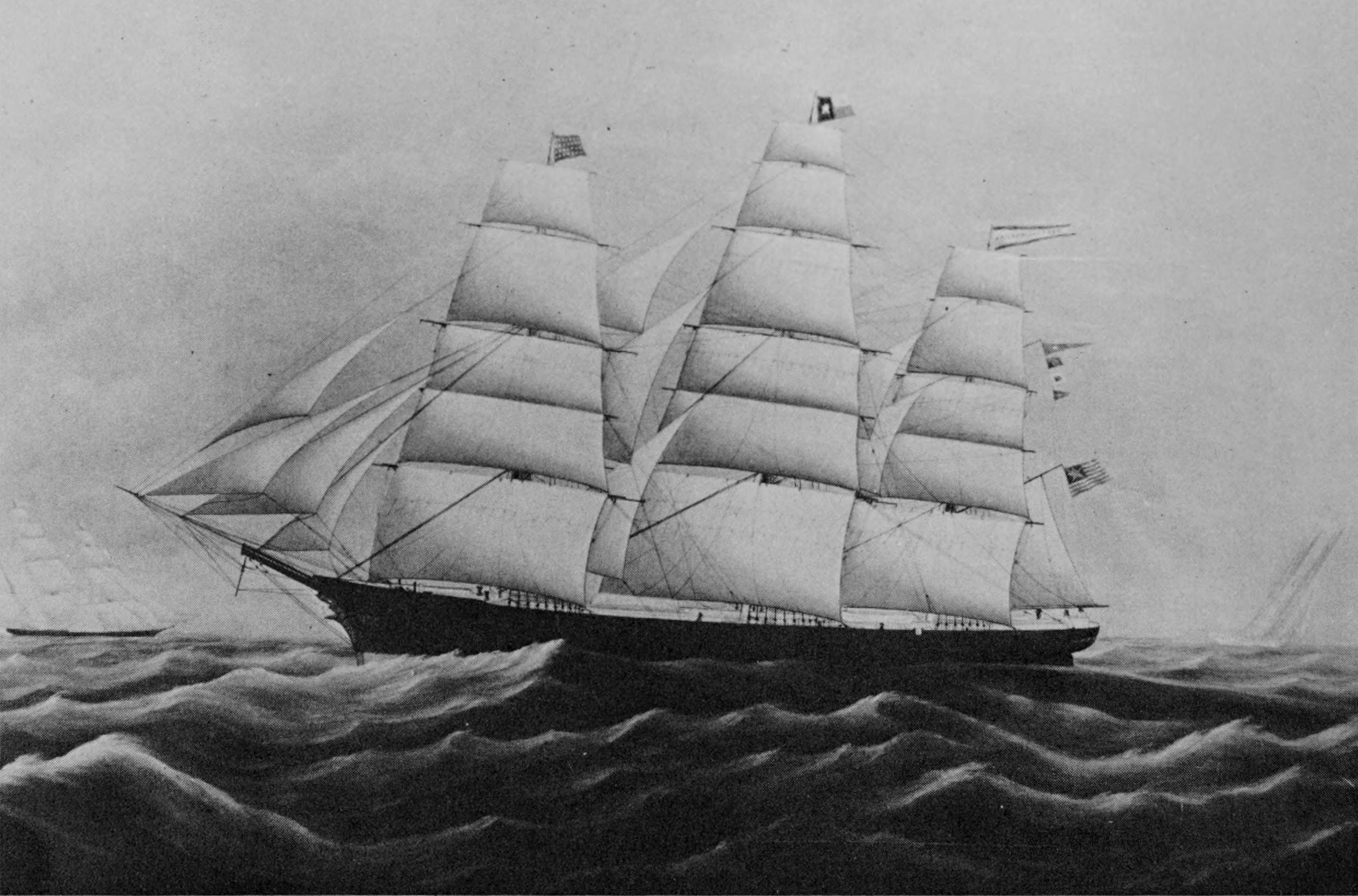
- Andrew Jackson

History

United States
- Name: Belle Hoxie
- Builder: Irons & Grinnell, Mystic, Connecticut
- Launched: March 1855
- Renamed: Andrew Jackson
- Owner: John H. Brower & Company
- Fate: Sold to British owners, 1863

United Kingdom
- Owner: H. L. Seligman, Glasgow (in 1868)
- Acquired: By British owners, 1863
- Fate: Wrecked 4 December 1868, East Indies

General characteristics
- Class & type: Medium clipper
- Tons burthen: 1679 tons OM
- Length: 220 ft (67 m).
- Beam: 41 ft 2 in (12.55 m)
- Draft: 22 ft (6.7 m). 3 in.

The Andrew Jackson was a 1,679-registered-ton medium clipper built by the firm of Irons & Grinnell in Mystic, Connecticut in 1855. The vessel was designed for the shipping firm of J.H. Brower & Co. to carry cargo intended for sale to participants in the California Gold Rush.

== Construction ==
The ship was 220 feet (67 m) in length, had a beam of 41 ft., 2 in., and a draft 22 ft., 3 in. The vessel was described as "a very handsome, well-designed ship. She was heavily sparred and carried double topsails, skysails, and royal studdingsails."

== Voyages ==
Andrew Jackson made seven passages from New York to San Francisco, with an average time of 106 1/3 days. These times compare well with the passages of extreme clippers such as Flying Cloud and Flying Fish, which averaged 105 5/7 days and 103 1/3 days respectively, and the vessel was advertised as "The Fastest Ship in the World."

== Record passage to San Francisco ==
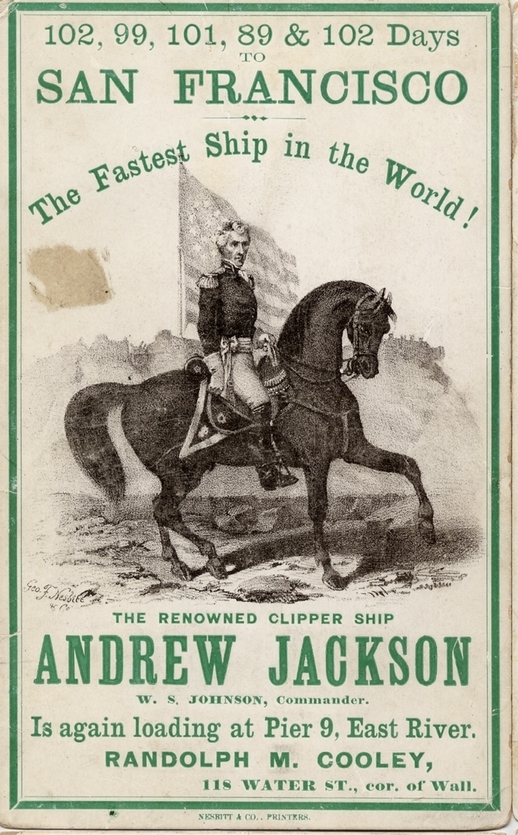
Advertising card for Andrew Jackson

Andrew Jackson is best known for her 1859–1860 run around Cape Horn from New York City to San Francisco, which the vessel performed in 89 days and 4 hours. The run began at noon on Christmas Day, 1859, and ended at 4 p.m. on 23 March 1860 at the Farallon Islands.

This was one of only three 89-day runs performed by square-rigged ships driving from New York City to California. The other two runs were both posted by Flying Cloud. Flying Cloud's fastest New York-to-California run had taken 89 days and 8 hours; Andrew Jackson's run was, by four hours, widely acclaimed in the newspapers as the fastest in history.

Andrew Jackson's run, as calculated above, was from New York City to the Farallon Islands, the pilot boat entry point to the harbor of San Francisco. Andrew Jackson did not get a pilot boat in a timely manner and did not actually tie up at a San Francisco wharf until the next day.

=== Andrew Jackson vs. Flying Cloud ===
Some clipper ship authorities, including Howe and Matthews, assert that Andrew Jackson did not actually set the record described above. They concede, however, that this medium clipper, perhaps not naturally as fast as Flying Cloud, achieved a remarkable passage as the result of a combination of hard driving by the captain and favorable winds.

However, after careful scrutiny of the logbooks, one author, Carl C. Cutler, concludes that a case can be made for either Flying Cloud or Andrew Jackson holding the record. Some will consider the passage from pilot-to-pilot as the appropriate indicator of fastest sailing performance around Cape Horn. Flying Cloud holds the record time for a passage anchor-to-anchor from New York to San Francisco, of 89 days 8 hours, while Andrew Jackson's completed passage anchor-to-anchor may have been as long as 89 days 20 hours.

== Loss ==
Andrew Jackson was lost on December 4, 1868, after going aground on a reef in the Gaspar Strait.

== Legacy ==
Andrew Jackson's 1859–1860 run was to be one of the final sailing-ship records posted by an American clipper ship. During the 1860s, the advance of steamships, and the creation of a worldwide network of coaling stations to serve them with a reliable supply of fuel, led to a collapse in the market for clipper-ship freight.

== Images ==
- Painting of clipper ship Andrew Jackson, Mystic Seaport Museum
- Painting by Percy Sanborn, Clipper Ship Andrew Jackson, sold in 2012.

== See also ==
- List of clipper ships
