= Black Ball Line (trans-Atlantic packet) =

American shipping company

- Type: Partnership
- Industry: Shipping, transportation
- Founded: 1817 (Note: The company was founded in 1817. It was not until 1818 that it began shipping operations.) in New York, United States
- Defunct: 1878
- Fate: Bankruptcy
- Area served: Transatlantic

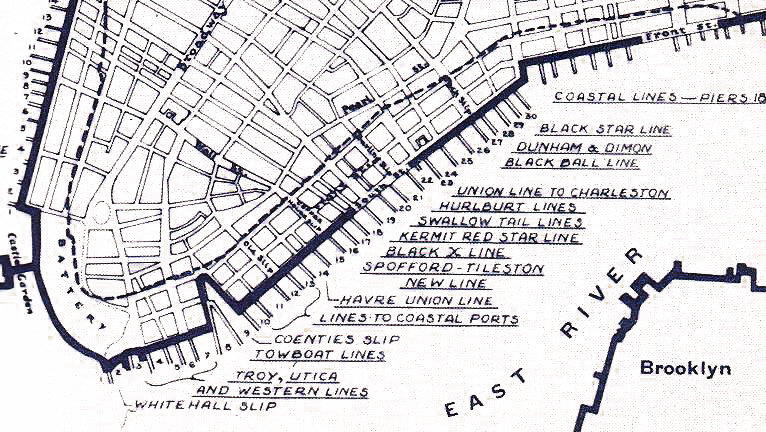
Map of the Port of New York on the south tip of Manhattan Island in 1851. Heavy broken line marks the waterfront below City Hall Park in 1784. Area filled in before 1820. The docks of the Black Ball Line are in the upper part of the figure.

The Black Ball Line (originally known as the Wright, Thompson, Marshall, & Thompson Line, then as the Old Line) was a passenger line founded by a group of New York Quaker merchants headed by Jeremiah Thompson, and included Isaac Wright & Son (William), Francis Thompson and Benjamin Marshall. All were Quakers except Marshall.

The line initially consisted of four packet ships, the Amity, Courier, Pacific, and the James Monroe. All of these were running between Liverpool, England and New York City. This first scheduled trans-Atlantic service was founded in 1817. In operation for some 60 years, it took its name from its flag, a black ball on a red background.

== History ==
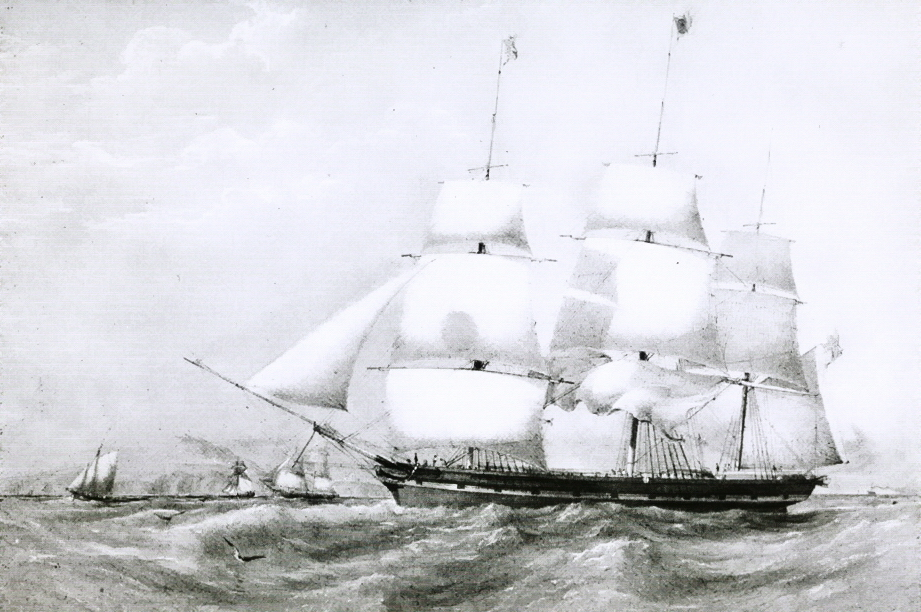
England, a packet ship of the Black Ball Line

The Wright, Thompson, Marshall, & Thompson Line was founded in 1817 and began shipping operations in 1818. At some point in the line's history, it was known as the Old Line and, after the 1840s, as the Black Ball Line. The Black Ball Line pioneered regularly scheduled shipping with fixed departure dates, thus contributing to the eventual development of travel by ocean liner. Governments contracted the packet ships to carry mail and also carried passengers and time-sensitive items such as newspapers. Up to this point, there were no regular passages advertised by sailing ships. They arrived at port when they could, dependent on the wind, and left when they were loaded, frequently visiting other ports to complete their cargo. The Black Ball Line undertook to leave New York on a fixed day of the month, irrespective of cargo or passengers. The service took several years to establish itself, and it was not until 1822 that the line increased sailings to two per month and reduced the cost of passage to 35 guineas.

The sensation this created brought in competitors such as the Red Star Line, which also adopted fixed dates. The average passage of packets from New York to Liverpool was 23 days eastward and 40 days westward. But this was at a period where usual reported passages were 30 and 45 days, respectively, while westward passages of 65 to 90 days excited no attention. The best passage from New York to Liverpool in those days was the 15 days 16 hours achieved at the end of 1823 by the ship New York (though often incorrectly reported as Canada). The westward crossing had a remarkable record of 15 days 23 hours set by the Black Ball's Columbia in 1830, during an unusually prolonged spell of easterly weather which saw several other packet ships making the journey in 16 to 17 days. Captain Joseph Delano was reported to be "up with the Banks of Newfoundland in ten days".

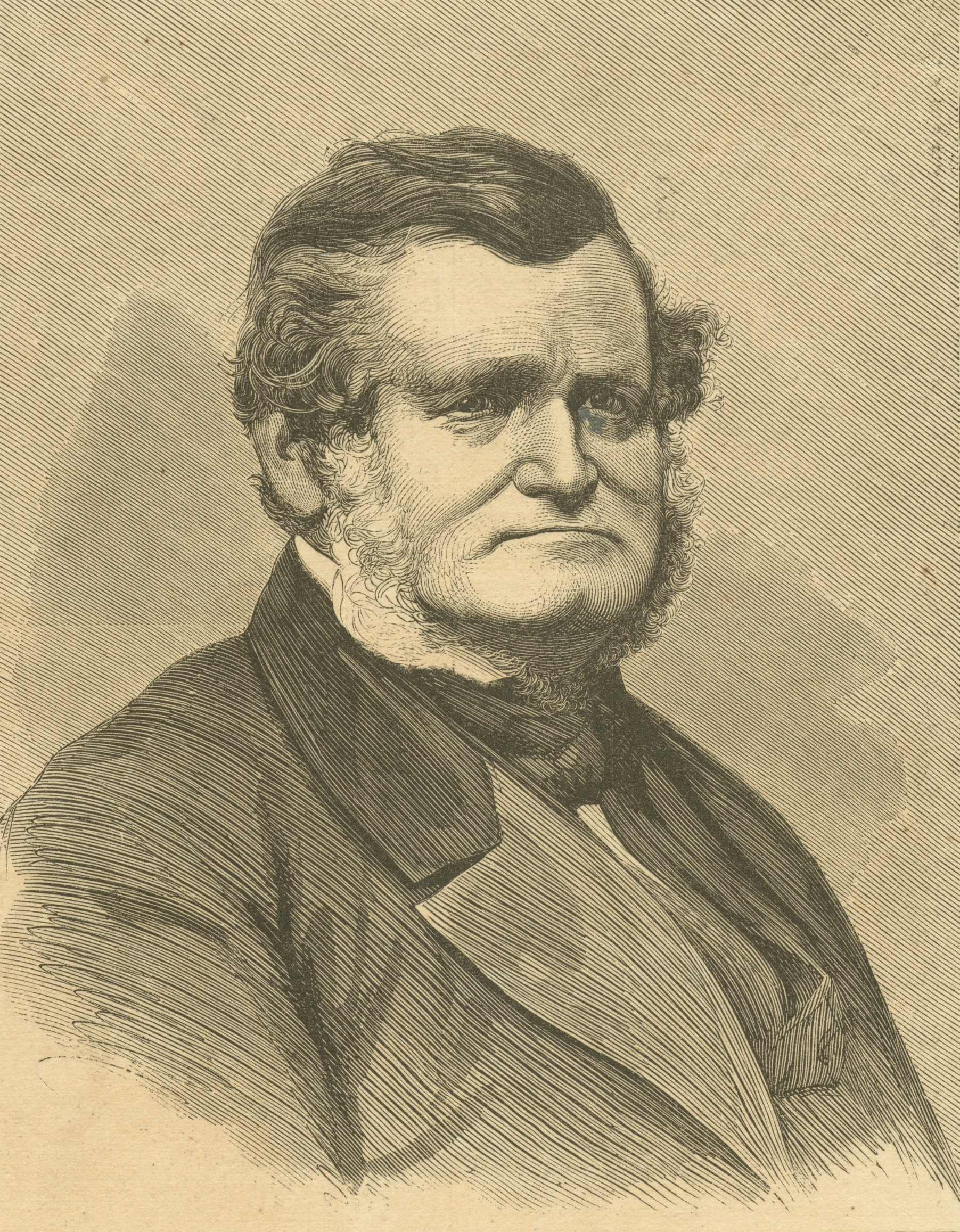
Captain Charles H. Marshall

In 1836 the Line passed into the hands of Captain Charles H. Marshall, he gradually added the Columbus, Oxford. Cambridge, New York, England, Yorkshire, Fidelia, Isaac Wright, Isaac Webb, the third Manhattan, Montezuma, Alexander Marshall, Great Western and Harvest Queen to the fleet.

The Black Ball Line is mentioned in several sea shanties, most prominently in "Hurrah for the Black Ball Line" (Roud 2623), which extols the speed and efficiency of the line and the hardness of its sailors. It is also mentioned in other shanties such as "Blow the Man Down", "Homeward Bound", "Eliza Lee", and "New York Girls".

== List of Black Ball Line (USA) ships ==
Year built	Name	Tonnage	Length	Beam	Shipyard	Remarks
1807	Pacific				A. & N. Brown, New York	Sold in 1819 and became a whaler
1816	Amity	382 (bm)			New York	stranded on 24 April 1824 in Manasquan
1817	Courier	381 tons	103'6''	29'	S. Wright, New York	Was a whaler from 1826 to 1861 and a part of the Great Stone Fleet during the Civil War
1817	James Monroe	424 tons	118 ft	28'3''	A. Brown, New York	The first packet of the Black Ball liner to depart on time, 5 January 1818; left the packet service in 1823 to the Cuban trade; ran aground in 1850 off the Tasmanian coast
1819	Albion				New York	wrecked off the coast of Ireland, near Kinsale, April 25, 1822, with a loss of forty-six lives
	Liverpool					wrecked on her maiden voyage
1822	Ship Superior				Isaac Webb	In 1822, Isaac Webb built the three-masted ship Superior in New York City for Charles Hall of the Black Ball Line.
1822	James Cropper					
1832	South America					
1843	Montezuma	924 (bm)			William H. Webb, New York	wrecked on Jones Beach, Long Island, 18 May 1854.
1843	Yorkshire	996 (bm)			William H. Webb, New York	in February 1862 lost on the trip from New York
1845	Fidelia	895 (bm)			William H. Webb, New York	
1869	Charles H. Marshall	1,683 (bm)			William H. Webb, New York	In 1887 sold to Norway as Sovereign; burned while loading coal 20 March 1891
1846	Columbia	1,050 (bm)			William H. Webb, New York	
1847	Isaac Wright	1,129 (bm)			William H. Webb, New York	caught fire on 23 December 1858 on the Mersey and sank
	Orpheus					
	New York					
1850	Manhattan	1,299 BRT			William H. Webb, New York	broke out on 14 March 1863 Liverpool en route to New York; disappeared
1851	Isaac Webb	1,359/1,497 BRT			William H. Webb, New York	went to the dissolution of the Black Ball Line for Charles H. Marshall & Co. and sank on 25 October 1880
1851	Great Western	1,443 BRT			William H. Webb, New York	
	Eagle					
	Orbit					
	Nestor					
	William Thompson					
	Albion					
	Canada					
	Britannia					
1854	Harvest Queen	1,383 BRT				sank 31 December 1875 after a collision, in the Irish Channel
1855	James Foster, Jr.	1,410 BRT			William H. Webb, New York	was in 1881 as a Hudson sold to German owners
1855	Neptune	1,406 BRT			William H. Webb, New York	ran in April 1876 to the Nova Scotia coast and broken
1860	Alexander Marshall	1,177 BRT			William H. Webb, New York	sank 1869 in the North Atlantic

== Similar shipping lines ==
- In 1851, James Baines & Co. of Liverpool entered the packet trade using the same name and flag as the New York company, despite its protests. Thus, for about twenty years, two "Black Ball lines", under separate ownership, were operating in direct competition in the transatlantic packet trade. James Baines & Co. also operated ships running between Liverpool and Australia, including famous clipper ships such as Champion of the Seas, James Baines, Lightning, Indian Queen, Marco Polo and Sovereign of the Seas.
- The Saint John-Liverpool Packet Line, which existed for a couple of years in the 1850s, was also known as the Black Ball Line. It was managed by Richard Wright, St. John, and William and James Fernie, in Liverpool.
- In 1894, Charles Peabody, a descendant of one of the founding Marshall brothers, created the Alaska Steamship Company and used a variation of the Black Ball Line's flag. In 1928, Peabody's son, Alexander Marshall Peabody, used that flag for his own new Puget Sound Navigation Company, which operated ferries under the name "Black Ball Line". Black Ball Ferry Line, a successor company to Puget Sound Navigation Company, currently operates the MV Coho daily across the US/Canada border. The Coho crosses from Port Angeles, Washington to Victoria, British Columbia.
