= James Baines =

James Baines may refer to:

- James Baines (draper) (1648–1717), English businessman and philanthropist
- James Baines (merchant) (1822–1889), British merchant, shipowner and shipbroker
  - James Baines & Co., parent company of a fleet of packet ships running between Liverpool, England and Australia
  - James Baines (clipper), a 1854 passenger clipper ship

== See also ==
- James Baine (1710–1790), minister of the Church of Scotland
- James Baynes (1766–1837), English watercolour painter and drawing-master
- James Bain (disambiguation)
