= Champion of the Seas =

19th-century English clipper ship

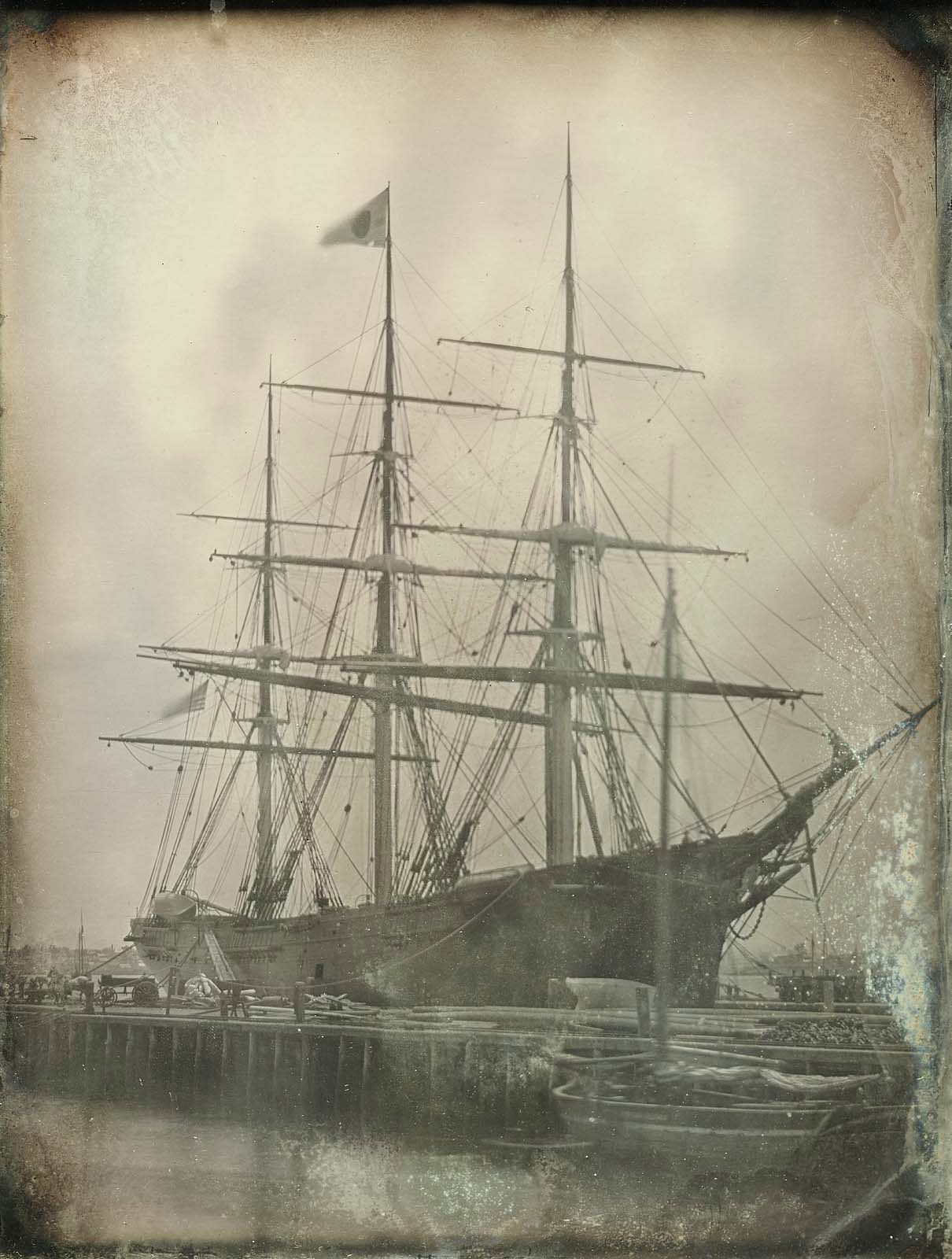
- Champion of the Seas c. 1854

History

United States
- Owner: Donald McKay; (1854)
- Port of registry: Boston
- Builder: Donald McKay, East Boston, MA
- Launched: 19 April 1854
- In service: 1854

United Kingdom
- Owner: Black Ball Line, Liverpool; (1854–1866); Thomas Harrison, Thomas Sully Stowe; (1866–1874); A. Cassels, Liverpool; (1874–1877)
- Port of registry: Liverpool
- Acquired: September 1854 (re-registered)
- Fate: Abandoned in leaking condition 3 January 1877

General characteristics
- Class & type: Clipper
- Tonnage: 2,447 GRT
- Length: 252 ft (77 m)
- Beam: 45 ft 6 in (13.87 m)
- Depth of hold: 29 ft (8.8 m)
- Propulsion: Sails (6,250 sq yd (5,230 m^{2}))
- Sail plan: Full-rigged ship

Champion of the Seas was the second largest clipper ship destined for the Liverpool, England - Melbourne, Australia passenger service. Champion was ordered by James Baines of the Black Ball Line from Donald McKay. She was launched 19 April 1854 and was abandoned 3 January 1877, off Cape Horn.

Champion of the Seas set a record for the fastest day's run in 24 hours: 465 nautical miles (861 km) noon to noon 10–11 December 1854 under the command of Captain Alexander Newlands (which translates into 19.5 knots). This record stood until August 1984, nearly 130 years.

== Construction ==
Champion of the Seas was "fuller aft than forward", and her strength of construction was an improvement over the Lightning, which Mackay had built the previous year. The frame was white oak, diagonally cross-braced with iron, planking and ceiling of hard pine, square fastened throughout. She had 3 decks. Her sail area and spars were roughly the same as Lightning. Her working suit of sails required 12,500 yards of cotton, 18 inches wide.

Upon completion, Champion of the Seas was towed from Boston to New York by the steam tug R.B. Forbes.

Champion of the Seas's figurehead was the full figure of a sailor "with his hat in his right hand, and left hand extended ... It was certainly a most striking figurehead, the tall square-built mariner, with dark curly hair and bronze clean-shaven face." Her semi-elliptical stern was ornamented with the coat of arms of Australia. She was painted black on the outside, white on the inside, with blue waterways: the colors of the Black Ball Line.

== History ==
James Baines ordered Champion of the Seas from Donald McKay of East Boston for the Black Ball Line of Liverpool. She was similar in appearance to McKay's other clippers, Lightning and James Baines, but set no sails above the royals. She set the record for the longest day's run, 465 nautical miles (861 km) on 10–11 December 1854 on her maiden voyage from Liverpool to Melbourne.

From her launching to 1868, Champion served in the passenger trade. During the Indian Mutiny of 1857, the British government chartered the three Black Ball clippers to carry troops to Calcutta. Before embarking about 1,000 troops, she and James Baines were reviewed by Queen Victoria. In 1868 she entered the general shipping trade. She remained in this trade until 3 January 1877 when she was abandoned, leaking badly, with a load of guano off Cape Horn.

Date	Log	Master
19 April 1854	Launched at the shipyard of Donald McKay, East Boston, for the Black Ball Line, Liverpool.
June 1854	New York to Liverpool in 29 days.	Captain Alexander Newlands
11 October 1854 – 26 December 1854	Her maiden voyage Liverpool - Melbourne took 75 days during which a 24‑hour run of 465 miles (861 km) was recorded.	Captain Alexander Newlands
1855	Melbourne-Liverpool in 84 days.	Captain Alexander Newlands
1855	Liverpool-Melbourne in 83 days.	Captain John McKirdy
1855 - 25 January 1856	Melbourne-Liverpool in 90 days.	Captain John McKirdy
1856	Liverpool-Melbourne in 85 days.
10 August 1857	Portsmouth-Bay of Bengal together with James Baines. Arrived at Sand Heads, Calcutta after 101 days.
1858	Departed Liverpool 8 August 1858 arrived Melbourne 7 November 1858 Passengers: 16 in Saloon and 298 in Intermediate and steerage.	Captain John McKirdy
1 January 1860 – 26 March 1860	Melbourne-Liverpool in 85 days.
20 November 1860 to 24 February 1861	Melbourne to Liverpool	Seaman William Cuthbert (my great great uncle). Served as seaman although he had a Master's certificate.
1866	Sold to Thomas Harrison and Thomas Sully Stowe for £9750, but chartered back to the Black Ball Line for three more voyages
September 1868	Put into general trading.
February 1874	After having found that she was badly affected by dry rot she was subsequently sold to A. Cassels of Liverpool for £7500.
July 1875	Arrived at San Francisco-Hong Kong in 39 days.	Captain Wilson
5 October 1875	San Francisco-Callao in 45 days.
3 January 1877	Abandoned off Cape Horn in leaking condition with a cargo of guano. The crew was saved by the British barque Windsor.

== In popular culture ==
Pan American World Airways (Pan Am) had a practice of naming its airliners "Clippers", as an allusion to the clipper ships of earlier times. Between 1984 and 1991, a Pan Am Boeing 747-121 airliner (MSN 19641 / tail number N734PA) was named Clipper Champion of the Seas in accordance with this practice. The airliner, which had been delivered to Pan Am in 1969, had previously been named Clipper Flying Cloud.

== See also ==
- List of clipper ships
- Bibliography of early American naval history
