= James Bain =

James Bain may refer to:

- Sir James Bain (Whitehaven MP) (1817–1898), Lord Provost of Glasgow, founder of Whitehaven Ironworks
- James Bain (minister) (1828–1911), Scottish minister
- James Bain (librarian) (1842–1908), Scottish-Canadian bookseller, publisher, and librarian
- James Bain (Egremont MP) (1851–1913), British Member of Parliament for Egremont, 1900–1906
- James Bain (footballer) (1878–?), Scottish footballer (Manchester United)
- James Bain (innocent prisoner) (born 1955), Florida, freed from prison after 35 years after DNA tests showed innocence
- James C. Bain (1870–1946), Australian vaudeville entertainer
- James Keith Bain (1929–2022), Australian businessman
- James Leith Macbeth Bain (1860–1925), Scottish hymn writer, religious minister and author
- James Thompson Bain (1860–1919), socialist and syndicalist in colonial South Africa
- James Tocher Bain (1906–1988), Canadian engineer
- James Walker Bain (1841–1899), New Zealand politician
- James Watson Bain (1875–1964), Canadian chemist
- James William Bain (1838–1909), Canadian politician and merchant

== See also ==
- Jamie Bain (born 1991), Scottish footballer (Airdrieonians)
- Jimmy Bain (1947–2016), Scottish bassist
- Jimmy Bain (footballer, born 1899) (1899–1969), Scottish footballer (Brentford)
- Jimmy Bain (footballer, born 1919) (1919–2002), Scottish footballer (Swindon Town)
- James Baine (1710–1790), minister of the Church of Scotland
- James Baines (disambiguation)
