= James Baines (clipper) =

Clipper ship launched in 1854

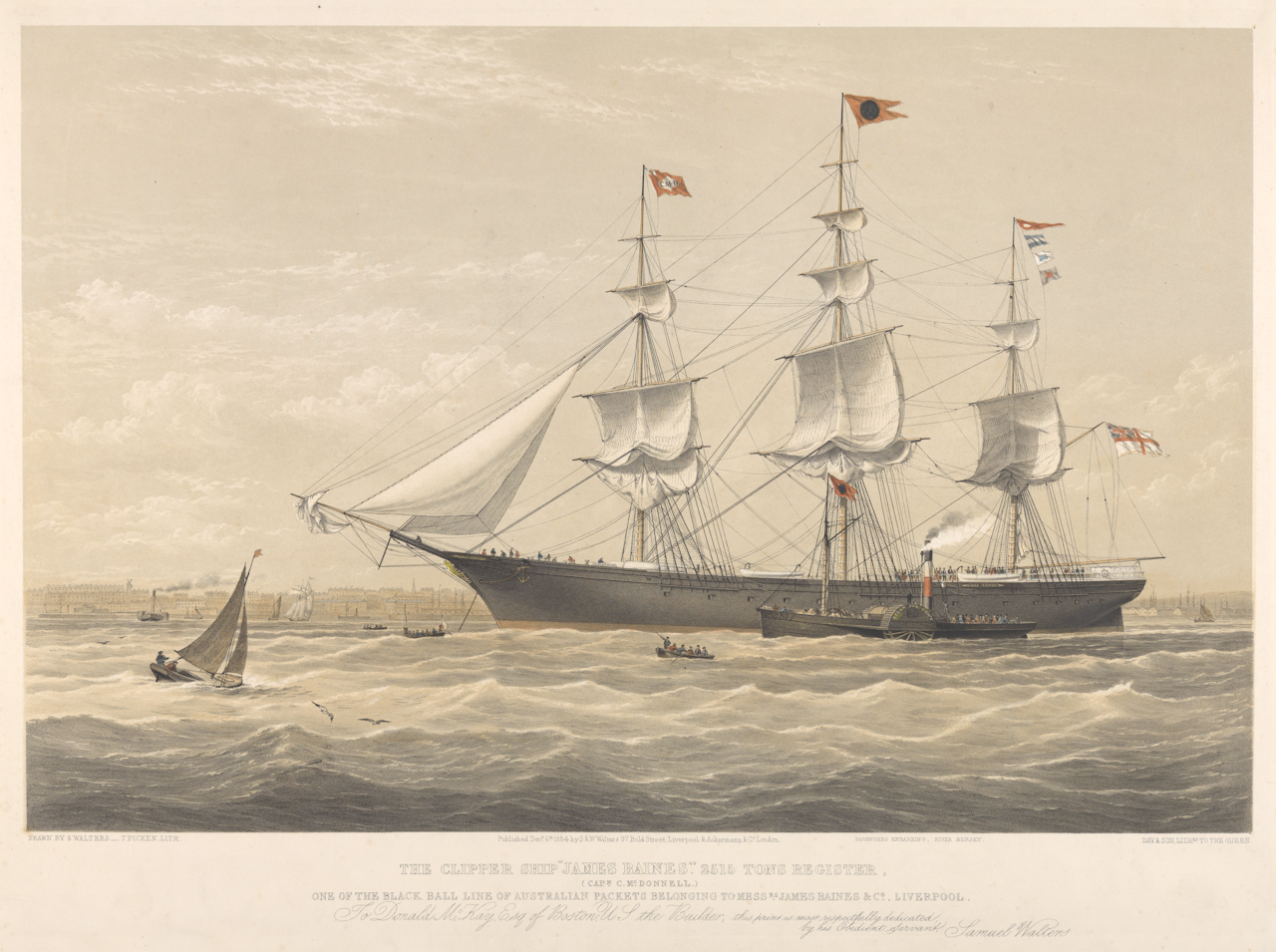
- James Baines

History

United Kingdom
- Namesake: James Baines, ship owner
- Owner: James Baines & Co.
- Ordered: 1853
- Builder: Donald McKay, East Boston
- Laid down: 1854
- Launched: 25 July 1854
- Christened: 25 July 1854 by James Baines
- Commissioned: 12 September 1854
- Out of service: 22 April 1858
- Home port: Liverpool
- Fate: Burned 22 April 1858; Rebuilt as a coal barge; Final fate unknown

General characteristics
- Class & type: full-rigged, three-masted sailing ship (clipper rigging); Passenger & Cargo Clipper ship
- Tonnage: 2,275 GRT
- Displacement: 2,515 tons (2,555 tonnes) at 29 ft (8.8 m) draught (1.000 tons ship mass + 1.455 tons cargo & passengers' mass)
- Length: hull: 226 ft (69 m), 266 ft (81 m) (LOA)
- Beam: 44 ft (13 m)
- Draught: 29 ft (8.8 m) loaded
- Propulsion: Sails
- Speed: 21 kn (39 km/h) on 17 June 1856 at 44°S, 106°E; best 24-hour run: 342 nmi (633 km) in 1854
- Boats & landing craft carried: 6 lifeboats
- Capacity: 1,400 tons cargo + 700 passengers
- Complement: 100 crew

James Baines was a passenger clipper ship completely constructed of timber in the 1850s and launched on 25 July 1854 from the East Boston shipyard of the famous ship builder Donald McKay in the United States for the Black Ball Line of James Baines & Co., Liverpool. The clipper was one of the few known larger sailing ships rigged with a moonsail.

== General description ==
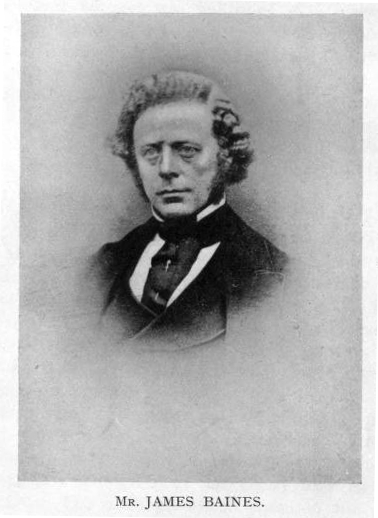
James Baines, the owner

Ship builder Donald McKay laid all his skills and professional experience in the construction of this passenger carrying clipper ship, small faults that had been detected by him before in the sister ships were fixed during the building of James Baines. Regarding her lines, stem, and bow, she was not as sharp and hollow-lined as her sister ship Lightning or as "full" as her other sister ship Champion of the Seas. The ship's main frame was of white oak, the ceiling, planking, deck-frames and keelsons, of hard pine. The ship's hull was diagonally braced with iron, and square-fastened, and all the keelsons and waterways are scarphed and keyed. It was said in her time the style in which James Baines's hull was designed and built, both inside and outside, has not been surpassed or equalled, by any other ship Donald McKay has ever constructed. The stern and the bow including the cutwater were beautifully adorned with gilded carvings, the ship's hull was painted black with blue waterways and a blue underwater ship. Her mast-heads and yards were black and equipped with iron caps, the hoops on her masts were held in white as well as the deck houses and rails. On Mr James Baines order the ship was equipped and fitted with the best and most modern ship improvements (pumps, windlasses & winches, Crane's self-acting chain-stoppers (invented in 1852)).

As she was built for a passenger shipping line, she provided 1st class accommodations equipped with mahogany panelling (wainscots) and standard rooms for the transportation of 700 passengers. The ship had also state-rooms and dining-rooms. Three decks, a poop deck, two deck houses and a topgallant forecastle provided the accommodations for three classes of passengers and the 100 men crew whose bunks were built in the forecastle and in a deck house abaft the foremast. The ladies' cabin was in the stern section (aft) as well as the captain's rooms, the gentlemen's rooms were amidships to the ship's sides. James Baines's first voyage was from Boston to Liverpool.

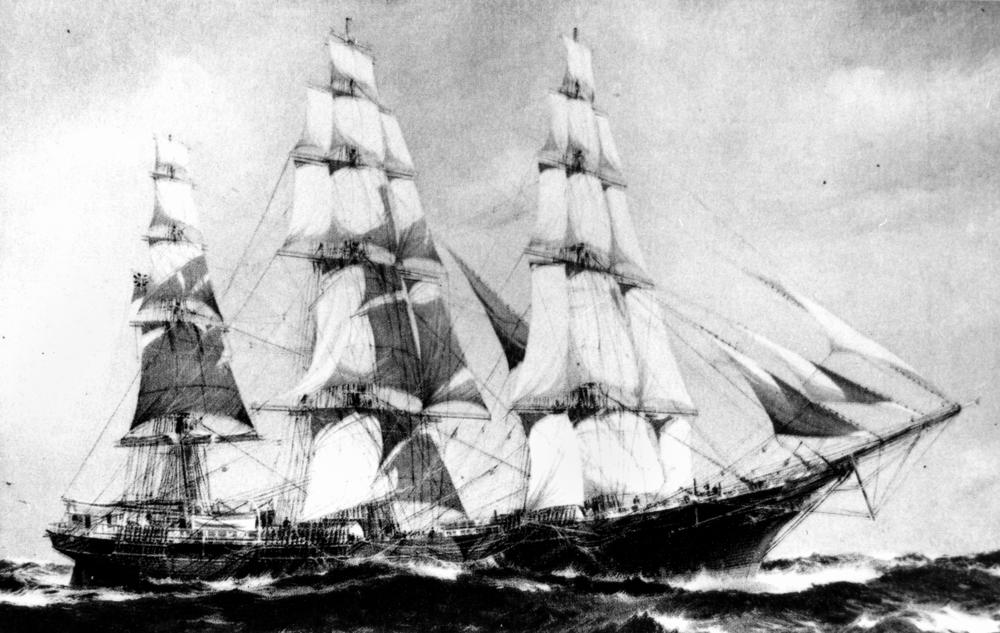
James Baines

Namesake of James Baines was her owner James Baines of James Baines & Co. of Liverpool and Australian packets and was once described as "the most perfect ship afloat". Mr James Baines shipped the figurehead to the McKay shipyard, securely packed in a sturdy case.

== History ==
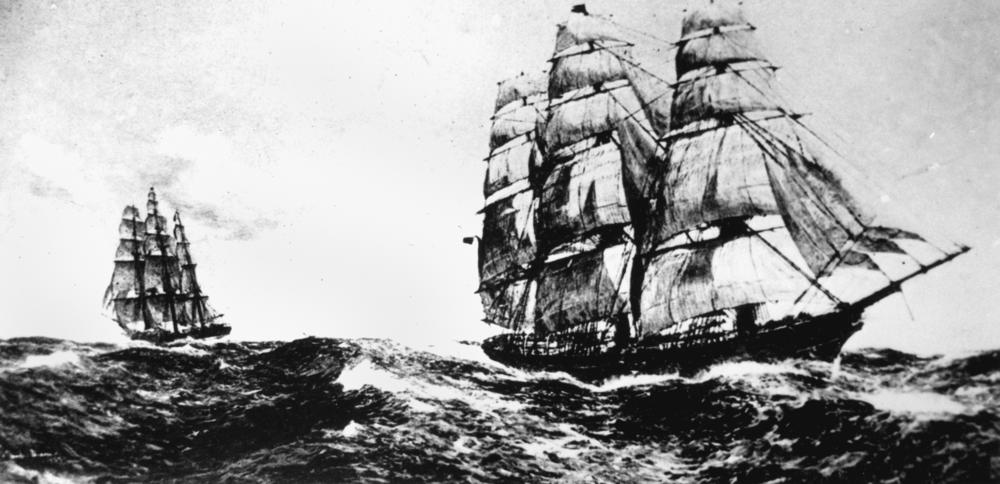
James Baines and Lightning

Capt. Charles McDonnell, late master of Marco Polo, took command of the ship. Her maiden voyage in 12 days and six hours from 12 to 24 September 1854 is still today an unbroken sailing ship record measured from East Boston (Boston Light) to Liverpool (Rock Light) - her homeport. During her short career her first voyage to Australia took her 65 days from Liverpool to Melbourne (her 'second' maiden voyage from her homeport) in 1854 and 69½ days for the return passage including the famous 420 nautical miles (780 km) day's run. She made four 'round' voyages to Melbourne and back to Liverpool via the Indian Ocean. In July 1857, James Baines (together with Champion of the Seas) was reviewed by Queen Victoria and the Prince Consort Albert while lying in Portsmouth. According to Lubbock, the Queen made remarks to the effect that "she did not know she possessed such a splendid ship in her Mercantile Marine." The clipper was in Portsmouth to load troops bound for India, having been chartered by the British Government to transport 1,000 men of the 97th Regiment. She returned to England with a cargo of jute, linseed, raw cowhides and rice.

== Fire and loss of the ship ==
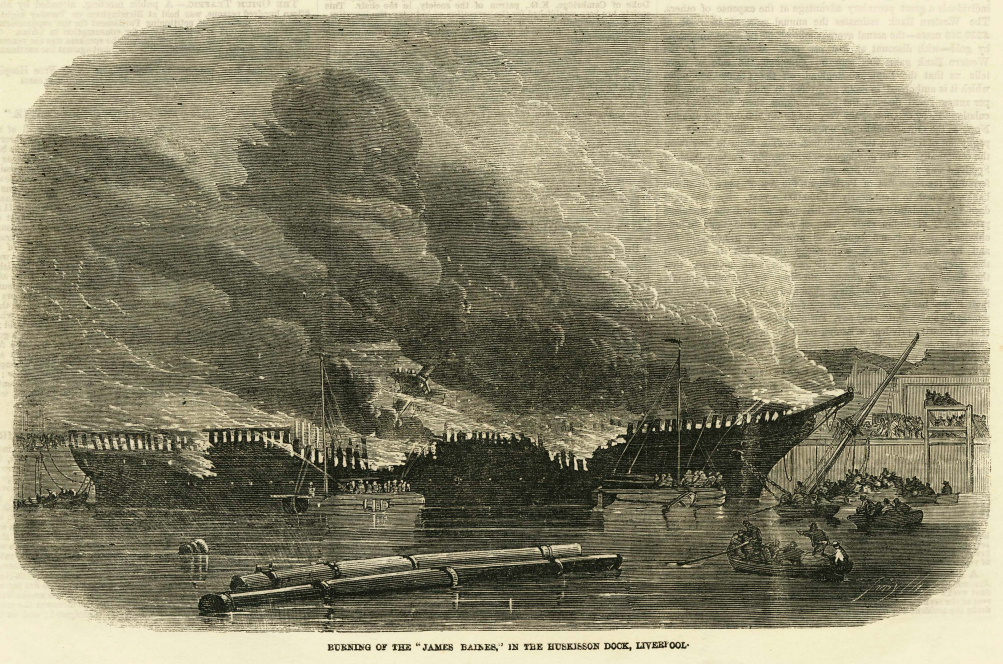
Burning of the James Baines, in the Huskisson Dock

James Baines caught fire on Thursday morning, 22 April 1858 while discharging her cargo in the Huskisson Dock at Liverpool following her only voyage from India. The ship burned down to the waterline. Her remains, including most of the undischarged cargo, were abandoned as a total loss amounting to £170,000 to her owner James Baines because the ship's insurance policy had expired three days before. The damaged hull was sold to the Liverpudlian shipowner Robert Pace for £1,080, who converted it into a coal barge which is said to have collided with another barge in 1860 at Galway harbour, Ireland. Still mentioned in the Liverpool Ship's Register of 1863 her final fate is unknown. Another reference has it that the ship became a landing stage in Liverpool harbour for the debarking steamer passengers. Captain Charles McDonnell, the first and last master of James Baines was broken-hearted following the disastrous end of his fine ship. He retired from naval service and died of pneumonia a few months later in his mother's cottage at Glenariff, County Antrim, Northern Ireland.

== Rigging ==
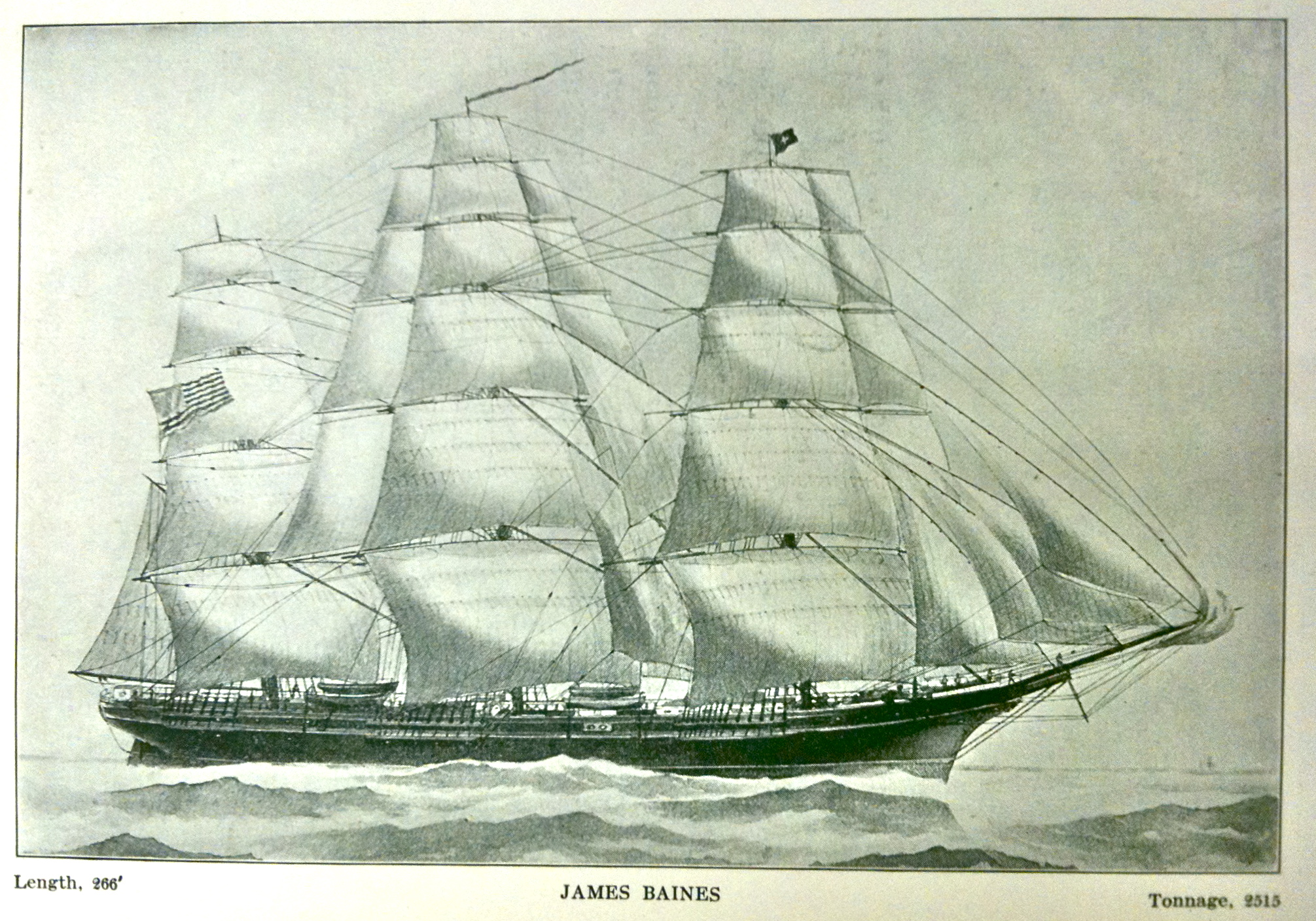

James Baines was a very heavily sparred ship being 2,275 GRT (Gross Registered Tons), she was wide, carrying 1,400 tons of cargo in her holds, and accommodating 800 passengers and crew in her 5 decks (3 continuous decks, forecastle and poop decks). Her masts called fore, main, and mizzen masts carried all in all a maximum of 43 sails as a full-rigged ship with studding sails. In detail:

- 16 square sails (5–5–5, later 5–6–5)
- 6 staysails
- 4 jibs
- 1 fore and aft sail - the spanker and
- 16 studding sails

All three masts (with lower, top, and topgallant masts including royal and skysail masts) had a course sail, a topsail, a topgallant sail, a royal sail, and a skysail. The main-skysail mast has been lengthened and fitted with a moonsail later on. Her sail suit was made by Messrs. Porter, Mayhew & Co., Boston. Older pictures show the ship with only four square sails on the fore and mizzen masts, and five on the main mast.

== Bibliography ==
- Mary Ellen Chase: Donald McKay and the Clipper Ships. Houghton Mifflin Company, Boston, 1959.
- Octavius T. Howe & Fredric C. Matthews : American Clipper Ships 1833-1858. Argosy Antiquarian, New York, 1967
- Helen & Jacques La Grange: Clipper Ships of America and Great Britain: 1833-1869. G. P. Putnam's & Sons, New York, 1936.
- Richard C. McKay: Some Famous Sailing Ships and Their Builder, Donald McKay. G. P. Putnam's Sons, New York, 1928; Easton Press, Norwalk (CT.), 1988.
- Richard C. McKay: Donald McKay and His Famous Sailing Ships. Dover Publications Inc., 1995 (reprint of the 1928 edition); ISBN 0-486-28820-X
- Duncan McLean: The New Clipper James Baines. The Boston Daily Atlas, Vol. XXIII, No. 53, Friday, 1 September 1854. Reprinted in NRJ Vol. 25, pp 33–35.
- Michael K. Stammers: The Passage Makers. Teredo Books, Brighton, 1978; ISBN 0-903662-06-X
