= Marco Polo (1851 ship) =

Canadian–British clipper ship

Coordinates: 46.507°N 63.422°W

- Marco Polo

History

New Brunswick
- Name: Marco Polo
- Namesake: Marco Polo (1254–1324), Venetian traveler
- Owner: James Smith
- Builder: James Smith, Saint John, New Brunswick
- Launched: 1851

United Kingdom
- Owner: James Baines, Liverpool, for the Black Ball Line (Australia Packets)
- Acquired: 1854
- Fate: Rebuilt to be used in the passenger trade.
- Notes: Rebolted with yellow metal bolts and coppered.

United Kingdom
- Owner: J. Wilson & Blain, South Shields Packets
- Acquired: 1871
- Fate: Put in the coal and timber trade

Norway
- Owner: Capt. Bull, Christiania Oslo, Norway
- Acquired: 1887
- Fate: July 22, 1884, wrecked near Cavendish, Prince Edward Island

General characteristics
- Type: Medium clipper
- Tonnage: 1,625 GRT
- Length: 184 ft 1 in (56.11 m)
- Beam: 36 ft 3 in (11.05 m)
- Draught: 29 ft 4 in (8.94 m)
- Depth of hold: 30 ft (9.1 m)
- Sail plan: Square-rigged, with Cunningham's patent roller reefing topsails. Reduced to barque rig, 1874.
- Notes: 3 decks; height between decks, 8 ft (2.4 m)

Marco Polo was a three-masted wooden clipper ship, launched in 1851 at Saint John, New Brunswick. She was named after Venetian traveler Marco Polo. The ship carried emigrants and passengers to Australia and was the first vessel to make the round trip from Liverpool in under six months. Later in her career, the ship was used as a cargo ship before running aground off Cavendish, Prince Edward Island, in 1883.

== Design and description ==
The vessel was initially designed as a cargo ship. The ship had a medium clipper design with an unusually sharp bow, tall masts, and broad amidships. The design was considered stable and able to withstand the punishment of the open sea. Marco Polo was a 184 feet 1 inch (56.11 m) long with a beam of 36 ft 3 in (11.05 m) and a draught of 29 ft 4 in (8,940 mm). The ship had a hold depth of 30 ft (9.1 m). Marco Polo weighed 1,625 tons. The ship was square rigged and fitted with the roller reefing system that allowed the sails to be reefed from the deck rather than by sending sailors aloft. The vessel had three masts and carried up to 22,000 square feet (2,000 m^{2}) of sail. Marco Polo was later reduced to a barque rig in 1874.

The clipper had three decks with a height between decks of 8 ft (2.4 m). After conversion to a passenger ship in 1852, the vessel's hull was coated with felt and tar and then sheathed in copper to prevent fouling. The vessel had three classes of travel; steerage, intermediate and cabin class. Those in steerage were placed in 6 feet square (36 square feet) berths with four to six people per berth. The passengers were divided between single male, female and families over three decks, with single men given berths forward, single women aft and families placed in between. The berths usually contained double bunks, and separate lavatories were maintained for each sex. Intermediate passengers had quarters between the decks, received better fare than the steerage class, and took their meals separately. They, too, were berthed four to six per berth, but had access to steward service. The cabin class passengers had individual cabins 6 feet square (36 square feet) located aft around the ship's sides. The cabin class passengers had access to the poop deck for exercise. The passengers furnished the cabins with the aid of the ship's carpenters to prevent their movement during rough seas. For meals, the cabin class passengers ate in the dining saloon, at the end of the central corridor, onto which all the cabins opened.

== Service history ==
James Smith constructed the vessel at Marsh Creek in Saint John, New Brunswick. Construction began in Fall 1850. While under construction, the ship's frame was scattered about the shipyard by a storm, and the skeleton had to be reassembled. The construction was completed in April 1851, and the vessel was launched at Marsh Creek. The launch was disastrous, as Marco Polo touched the creek's bank while sliding down the slipway. The vessel went over on her side and became stuck in the mud of Marsh Creek. The uneven pressure from the ship's weight caused the keel to become curved, so she was 6 inches (15 cm) higher in the middle than at the ends. Marco Polo was refloated two weeks after launching and was registered on May 26, 1851, under the ownership of James Smith and his son, James Thomas Smith.

=== Cargo trade ===
On May 31, 1851, Marco Polo sailed from Saint John to Liverpool, England with a cargo of timber, making the crossing in 15.3 days. The vessel's maiden voyage under William Thomas was a success, and upon arrival, she was offered for sale by James Smith. Marco Polo did not sell, and the clipper was sent in ballast to Mobile, Alabama, to pick up a cotton cargo. The clipper made a second voyage to Liverpool, this time under the command of Amor Crosby. In February 1852, James Smith transferred all his shares in the clipper to his son, James Thomas Smith, who then sold the vessel to Paddy McGee. McGee then flipped Marco Polo for profit to James Baines of James Baines & Co.

=== Emigrant ship ===
In 1852, the ship was purchased by James Baines for the Black Ball Line and converted for passenger service between England and Australia to take advantage of the growing emigrant movement following the Australian gold rush. On Marco Polo's first voyage to Australia, the clipper carried over 900 people. 138 were Cabin or Intermediate class, 750 were steerage, 60 were crew; 327 were children, and 661 were Highland Scots. At the time of the clipper's departure, Marco Polo was the largest ship to travel to Australia. Marco Polo sailed from Liverpool under the command of James Forbes on July 4, 1852, and arrived at Port Phillip, Australia, in 68 days, on September 18. After spending three weeks in port, the ship returned to Liverpool in another 76 days. The total trip time was 5 months 21 days, making this the first recorded round trip in less than six months. During the first voyage, 52 children died from measles, which led to new rules about the age of young children allowed aboard on subsequent voyages. On her return voyage, the ship carried £100,000 in gold dust and a 340-ounce gold nugget that was a gift to Queen Victoria from the colonial government. Upon the vessel's return to Liverpool, the ship carried a banner claiming "Fastest Ship in the World."

Marco Polo sailed on the clipper's second voyage with 648 passengers and £90,000 of specie. Marco Polo departed on March 13, 1853, and arrived at Melbourne on May 29. At the end of the second voyage, Charles McDonald replaced James Forbes as vessel captain. He commanded the clipper for her third voyage, leaving in November 1853 with 666 passengers on board.

McDonald was replaced as captain by W. Wild, who sailed on the fourth voyage, taking 95 days from Liverpool to Australia and 85 days for the return trip. He was replaced by Captain Clarke for the fifth voyage to Australia, taking a total of 167 days, round-trip. The fifth voyage transported 520 emigrants to Australia and returned with 125,000 ounces of gold. It has been asserted, "One in every twenty Australians can trace his or her roots to Marco Polo." In total, Marco Polo made roughly 25 round-trip voyages to Australia and averaged between 80 and 90 days each way. The clipper made her final Melbourne to Liverpool voyage in 76 days, beating the passenger steamship SS Great Britain by 8 days. In 1867, Marco Polo failed the passenger survey and was returned to service as a cargo ship.

=== Incidents ===
During the England to Australia runs, Marco Polo suffered two near mutinies. The first occurred in October 1854 after the captain beat the third mate, attacked another member of the crew and challenged all on board to a fight. 17 crew members deserted, and the same night, the captain fired his cannon off in the port. The third mate complained to the police, and the captain was fined £180. The second near mutiny occurred on September 17, 1863, when some crew members broke into the store and raided the alcohol. Some of the crews were found drunk in the morning, and during the captain's investigation, the captain was challenged by the crew. In the end, all alcohol use was prohibited aboard the ship except by married persons.

On December 6, 1855, the clipper parted her tow rope while leaving the Mersey, collided with the barque Glasgow and ran aground. Marco Polo became unstuck without significant damage and sailed for Melbourne, Victoria, on December 7. She made another trip to Melbourne in 1856. On March 4, 1861, Marco Polo collided with an iceberg north of Cape Horn, her bowsprit lost, her bow and foremast damaged. The clipper arrived in Valparaíso leaking badly on May 2. After repairs, the clipper continued to Liverpool, where she arrived on May 22, 183 days after leaving Melbourne.

=== Last voyages ===
The clipper remained in passenger service until 1867. In 1867, Marco Polo was converted back to cargo use. During her career as a cargo ship, the vessel carried guano, coal and timber and visited ports from Aden to Rio de Janeiro and around the Mediterranean Sea. In 1871, James Baines and Co. sold the vessel to Wilson and Blair of South Shields, England, using her in the coal and timber trade. The vessel was altered in 1874 to a barque rig, and her wooden masts were removed; the clipper was fitted with an iron mast, and the yards were shortened by 12 feet (3.7 m). In the 1870s, Marco Polo waited at Callao for over 18 months for a load of guano. This was due to a dispute between the Guano Shipping Association and British shipping underwriters. In the early 1880s, the vessel's hull was deteriorating, so chains were wrapped around it to strengthen it, and a windmill-driven pump was installed to counter increasing leakage. In 1881, Marco Polo was purchased by Bell and Lawes of South Shields and in 1882, the ownership was transferred to Captain A. Bull of Christiana. On June 27, a fire broke out in port at Quebec with little damage. On July 19, 1883, Marco Polo departed Montmorency, Quebec, for Europe with a load of timber. On July 22, the clipper encountered a gale and began to take on water. The pumps could not keep up with the leakage, and Captain Bull ran the ship aground off Cavendish, Prince Edward Island.

After Marco Polo went aground, her masts were cut down to prevent the wind from blowing Marco Polo further onshore. The cargo was sold off to parties from Saint John. The timber had swollen so much that it was necessary to cut through the vessel's beams to retrieve them. In August 1883, a strong storm caused the vessel to break up along the coast.

== Wreck and reconstruction ==
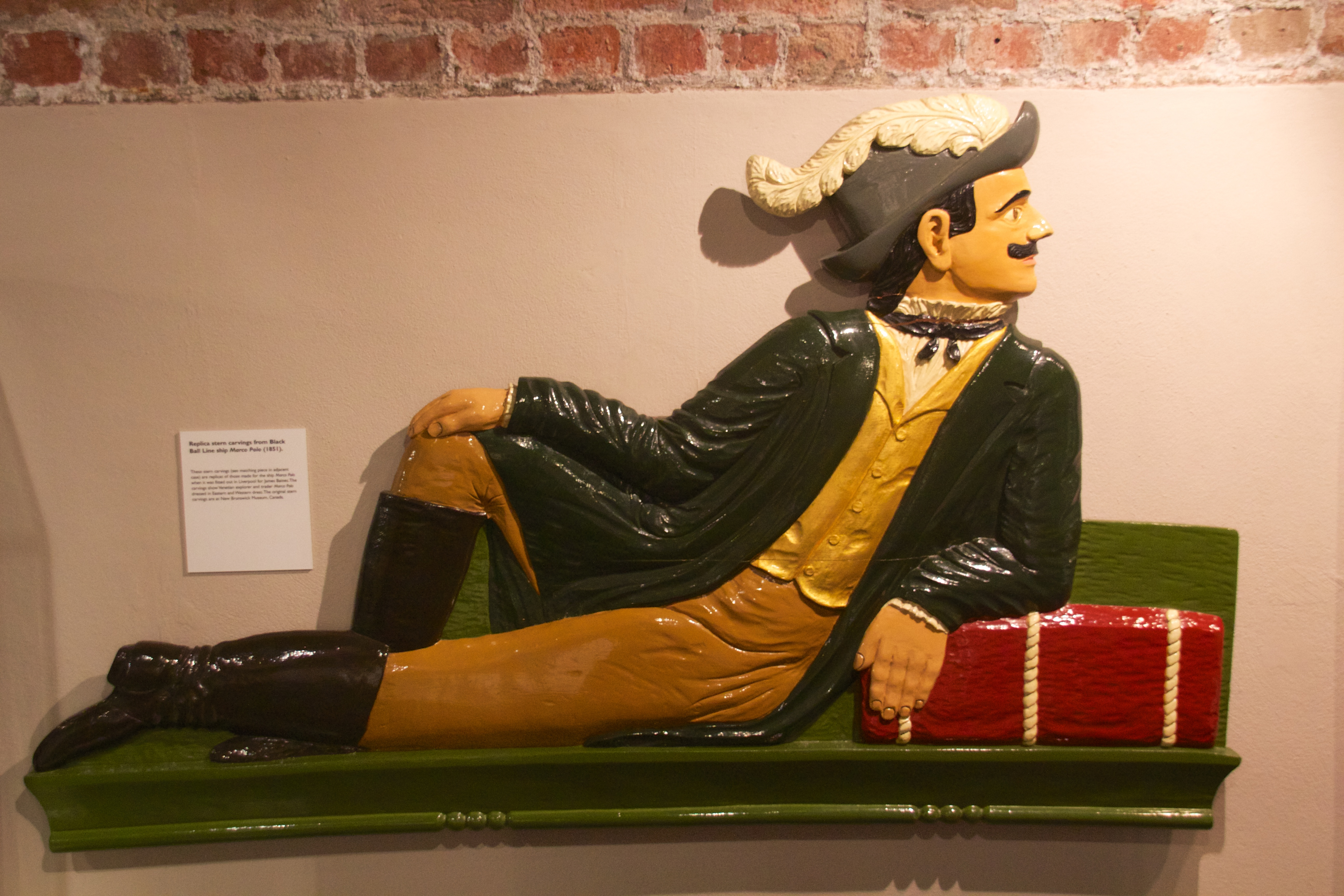
Replica stern carvings from Marco Polo, on display in the Merseyside Maritime Museum.

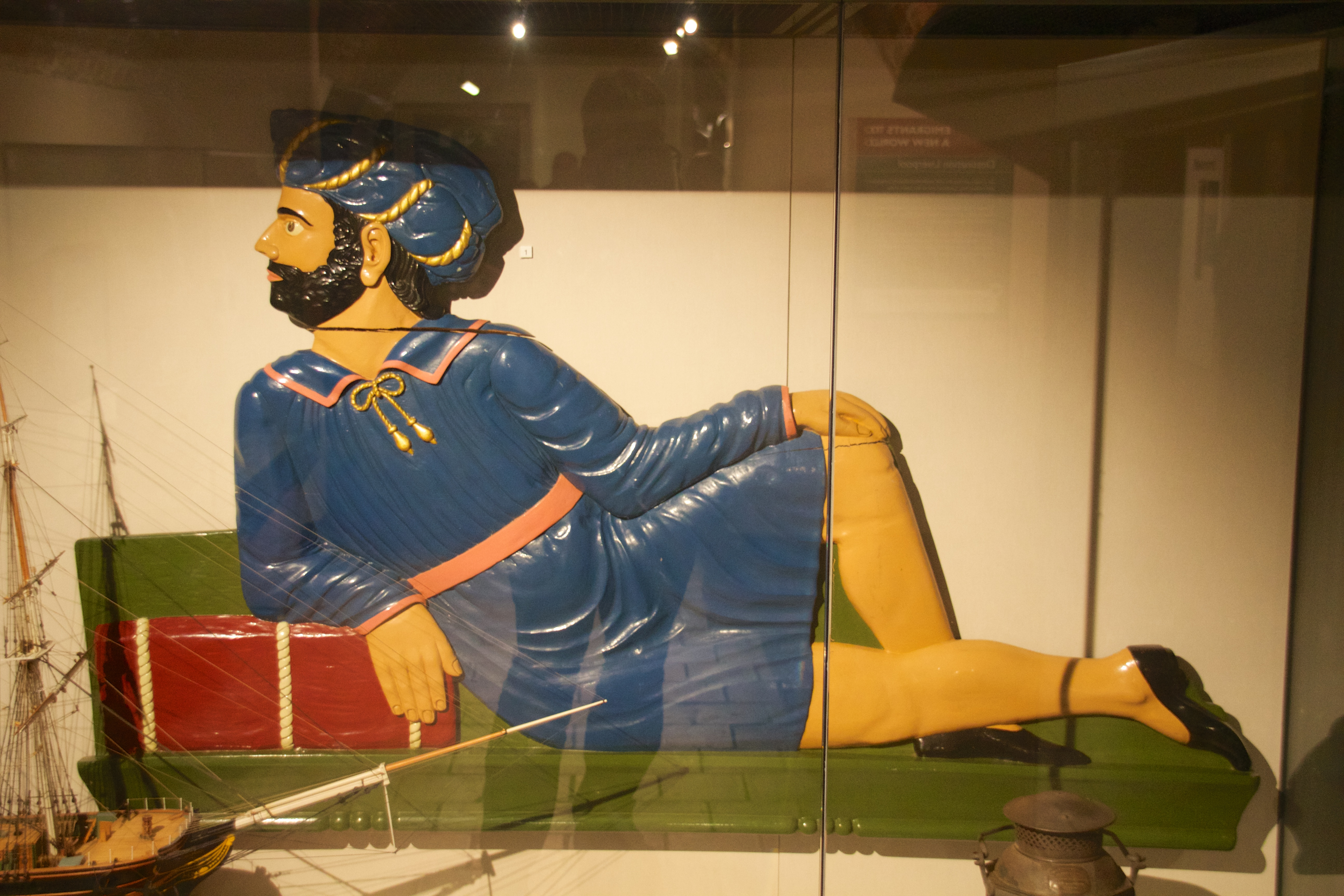
Replica stern carvings from Marco Polo, on display in the Merseyside Maritime Museum.

The wreck site is in the waters immediately offshore from Prince Edward Island National Park and is considered a National Historic Site. A ship portrait and many artifacts from the ship are on display at the New Brunswick Museum in Saint John, New Brunswick. Another ship portrait is displayed at the Yarmouth County Museum & Archives in Yarmouth, Nova Scotia. The original half-model of Marco Polo now lies in the Mariners' Museum in Newport News, Virginia.

A 28-foot (9 m) replica, named Marco Polo II, was constructed in Saint John over 30 years at over $50,000. The replica was located within the Port of Saint John in 2015.

== In popular culture ==
- Marco Polo, Queen of the Seas, a film by the National Film Board of Canada
- The Marco Polo suite by composer Jim Stewart
- Marco Polo, a sea shanty by British folk band The Spinners
- The Wreck of the Marco Polo, a short story by author Lucy Maud Montgomery
