= Packet trade =

Type of oceangoing cargo wherein shipments are made on a regular schedule

Generally, packet trade is any regularly scheduled cargo, passenger and mail trade conducted by boat or ship. The boats or ships are called "packet boats or packet ships" as their original function was to carry mail.

A "packet ship" was originally a vessel employed to carry post office mail packets to and from British embassies, colonies and outposts. In sea transport, a packet service is a regular, scheduled service, carrying freight and passengers. The ships used for this service are called packet ships or packet boats. The seamen are called packetmen, and the business is called packet trade.

"Packet" can mean a small parcel but, originally meant a parcel of important correspondence or valuable items, for urgent delivery. The French-language term "paquebot” derives from the English term "packet boat," but means a large ocean liner.

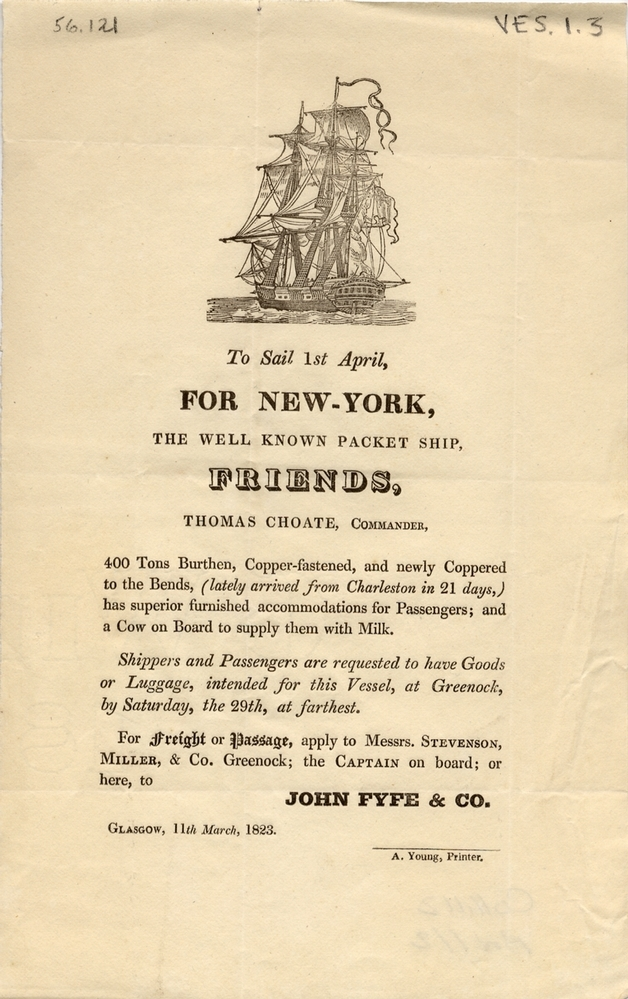
Poster advertising a packet service, Greenock, Scotland to New York, 1823

This sense became extended to mean any regularly scheduled ship, carrying passengers, as in packet trade. The word "packet" is frequently modified by the destination, e.g. Sydney packet, or by motive force, e.g. "steam packet".

== History ==
Many states, civilisations and organisations set up mail systems for high value goods, especially confidential correspondence and bullion. In times of war, regular shipments ran the gauntlet of warships and privateers, and even in peacetime, pirates could be a threat on some routes. In 1829, the pirate Mansel Alcantra captured the packet Topaz and killed her crew after looting her.

In Britain, the Post Office Packet Service used small, fast, lightly armed ships to carry state papers to overseas destinations on a regular schedule. This service operated from Tudor times until 1823, when the Admiralty assumed the responsibility for running the service. During the French Revolutionary and Napoleonic Wars the packet ships were targets for privateers and warships seeking prize money. Although some were captured, others managed to fight back. In the 1850s the Post Office moved to using contract carriers.

Other European states with overseas colonies also developed packet mail systems. Eventually, however, commercial steam liners began to work regular international schedules and received contracts from governments to carry mail as well as passengers and high-value cargo. Their services retained the name "Packet".

== Companies ==
Packet shipping companies included:

- Baltimore Steam Packet Company
- Black Ball Line (trans-Atlantic packet)
- City of Dublin Steam Packet Company
- Cunard Line
- Isle of Man Steam Packet Company
- Swallowtail Line (trans-Atlantic packet)
- Woolwich Steam Packet Company
- Robert Kermits Red Star Line

=== Black Ball line ===
In 1818, ships of the Black Ball line began regularly scheduled trips between Britain and the United States. These "packet ships" (named for their delivery of mail "packets") were infamous for keeping to their disciplined schedules. This often involved harsh treatment of seamen and earned the ships the nickname "bloodboat".

The original Black Ball Line was founded by a group of New York Quakers, but later a rival service founded by James Baines of Liverpool also styled itself the Black Ball Line, despite the protests of the original company of that name.

== By country ==
=== United States ===
In the United States, "packet trade" is often used to refer to the Atlantic (or Western) Ocean packets which traded with Europe and Africa (notably Cape Verde). Packet boats, smaller vessels designed for domestic use, also were extensively used in the 19th century for internal mail and scheduled service using rivers and canals, such as along the Erie Canal, which cut travel time across New York state in half; the Pennsylvania Canal, the James River and Kanawha Canal, and navigable rivers.

During the 18th century ships carrying cargo, passengers and mail between Europe and America would sail only when they were full. Starting in the early 19th century, as trade with America became more common, schedule regularity became a priority.

=== Australia ===
The first seagoing ship built in Van Diemens Land (in 1812) was named the Henrietta Packet by virtue of the fact that she offered a regular passenger service between Hobart, Tasmania and Sydney, New South Wales. From the 1830s the term "steam packet" was commonly applied to early steam ship services that, at least in theory, offered a regular and reliable service, and is perpetuated today by many waterfront establishments around Australia bearing such names as the "Steam Packet Inn" or "Steam Packet Hotel".

Both fast sailing ships and early steam ships holding mail contracts between Great Britain and Australia were also often referred to as packets. These included several ships of James Baines' Black Ball Line and the Orient Line.

=== Netherlands ===
In the late 15th to mid 16th century the Dutch system of the beurtvaart developed, a related system for mostly inland navigation. Ships of the beurtvaart carried passengers, livestock and freight along fixed routes at fixed prices with scheduled departures. Organised by the cities, it grew to an extensive and reliable network over the following century. Some of the cities arranged for international (seagoing) connections as well.

In the second half of the 19th century authorities withdrew from intervening and a lot of steamship companies sprang up, offering much the same services. Some carried freight and livestock only, some of them were mainly for passenger transport, becoming more like public transport. They would call their service beurtvaart or occasionally use the word 'packet' as did Alkmaar Packet.

=== Cape Verde ===
Because of the influence of whaling and several local droughts, there was substantial migration from Cape Verde to America, most notably to New Bedford, Massachusetts. This migration built strong ties between the two locations. A strong packet trade between New England and Cape Verde developed during the early-to-mid-19th century.

== Modern day ==
In the 21st century, ePacket delivery became available through the US Postal Service as a deal with China Post, Hongkong Post, and the Korean postal service in order to support internet commerce between East Asia and the United States. Vendors in those countries can sell goods directly to American customers while enjoying delivery rates that are often less even than domestic US vendors would pay to deliver the same parcel. These low rates and the current lack of protective tariffs on imported goods from foreign countries make the service controversial because it apparently gives foreign vendors, especially in mainland China and Hong Kong, a competitive advantage in the still-growing online market. The USPS has complained of inability to effectively negotiate prices with the Chinese postal services, and as of 2013 was losing millions of dollars on the service each year.
