= James Baines & Co. =

- Type: Private
- Industry: Shipping, transportation
- Founded: 1851
- Defunct: 1871
- Fate: Closed
- Headquarters: 6 Cook Street, Liverpool, England, UK
- Key people: James Baines and Thomas Mackay
- Number of employees: up to 300 officers and 3000 seamen in 1860
- Subsidiaries: Liverpool Black Ball Line of Australian Packets

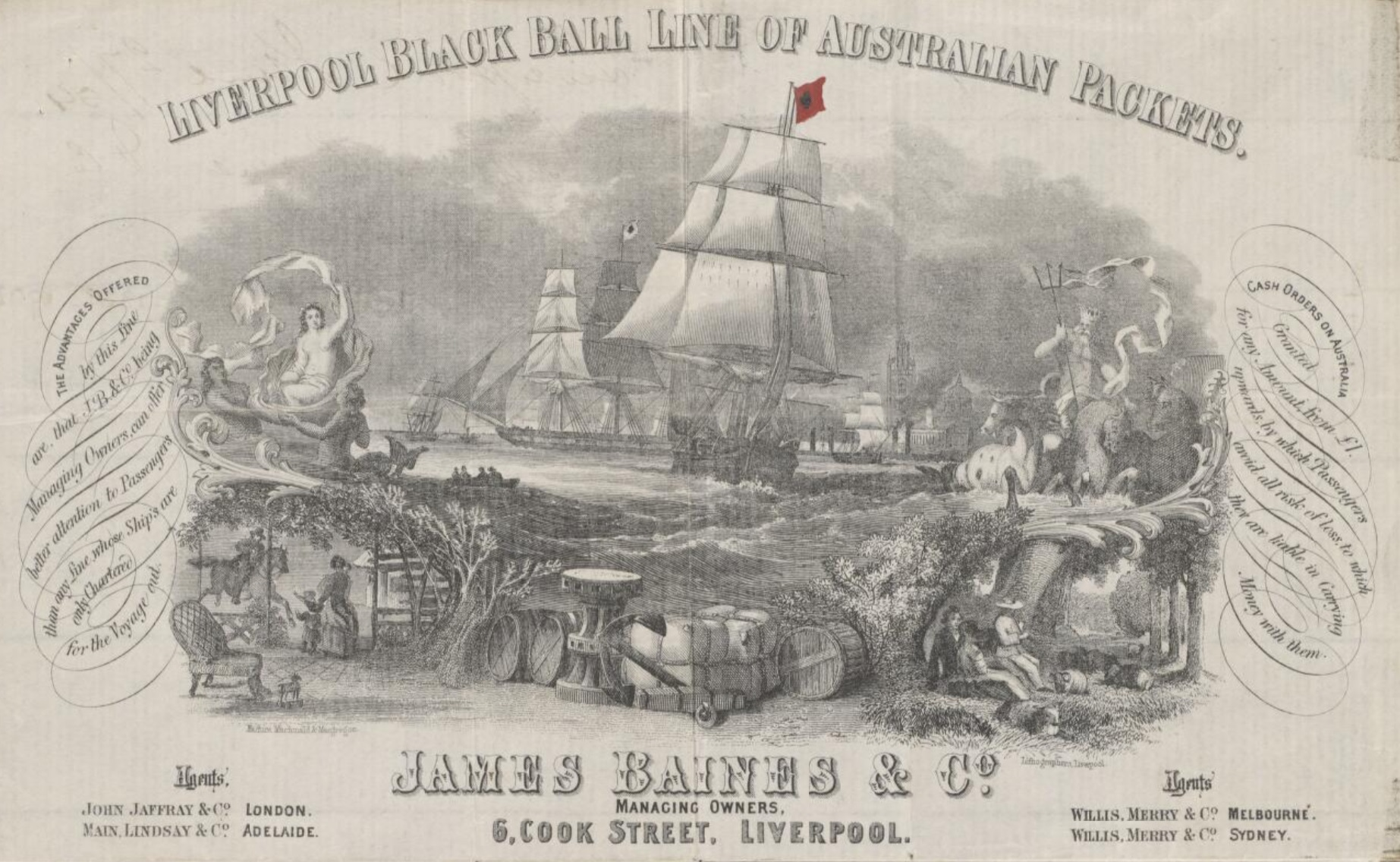
Liverpool Black Ball Line of Australian Packets letter head

James Baines & Co. of Liverpool was a British shipping company, most famous for the Liverpool Black Ball Line of Australian Packets, a fleet of packet ships running cargo and passenger services between Liverpool, England, and Australia in the second half of the 1800s. It also traded in India and Crimea.

== Founders ==
The company was founded and headed by James Baines and Thomas Miller Mackay with two junior partners, Joseph Greaves and John Taylor. Its office was located at 6 Cook Street, Liverpool. In 1858, Mackay established a separate office of the company in London. The legality of its business practices and the flexibility of its operations were controversial and often put the company under suspicion.

== Name ==
In 1851 James Baines & Co. of Liverpool entered the packet trade using the same name and flag as the New York company, despite its protests. Thus, for about twenty years, two "Black Ball lines" under separate ownership were operating in direct competition on the transatlantic packet trade.

== Symbols ==
The flag of the company was a red swallowtail with a black dot.

== The Australian line ==
The company started with its 1851 purchase of the ship Marco Polo. As the demand for passenger transport to Melbourne, Australia fueled by the 1850s gold rush grew, Baines commissioned a famous American shipbuilder, Donald McKay to build four clippers for the line. The line rapidly became one of the most popular of its time, rising to the level of its rival White Star Line. As the gold rush traffic subsided after 1856, James Baines & Co.signed an agreement with the Queensland colony in 1860 and ran a monopoly on that route, providing emigrants to the colony. In 1864 there was an unsuccessful attempt to merge with White Star and Gibbs, Bright and Co. of Liverpool.

Some of the ships of the Line also carried British troops during the Crimean War and the Indian Mutiny.

=== Fleet ===
James Baines & Co. operated some of the finest and most famous American clipper ships at the time, such as Champion of the Seas, Flying Cloud, James Baines, Lightning, Indian Queen, Marco Polo, Sovereign of the Seas and many others. Some of the clippers Baines was able to buy at a very low price following the Panic of 1857 and the onset of the American Civil War. Besides the American vessels, the fleet of the Line contained a number of softwood vessels built in the Maritime Provinces of Canada as well as oak and teak ships built in England and Scotland.

Although it is hard to estimate the exact size of the Line's fleet as they used charter ships extensively, at its peak in 1860, the Line had a fleet of 86 ships carrying cargo and passengers out to Australia. Overall, more than 400 ships carried British immigrants to Australia during the 1850s and 1860s with the help of James Baines & Co.

In 1864, with 13 ships James Baines & Co. was the biggest single buyer of U.S. ships.

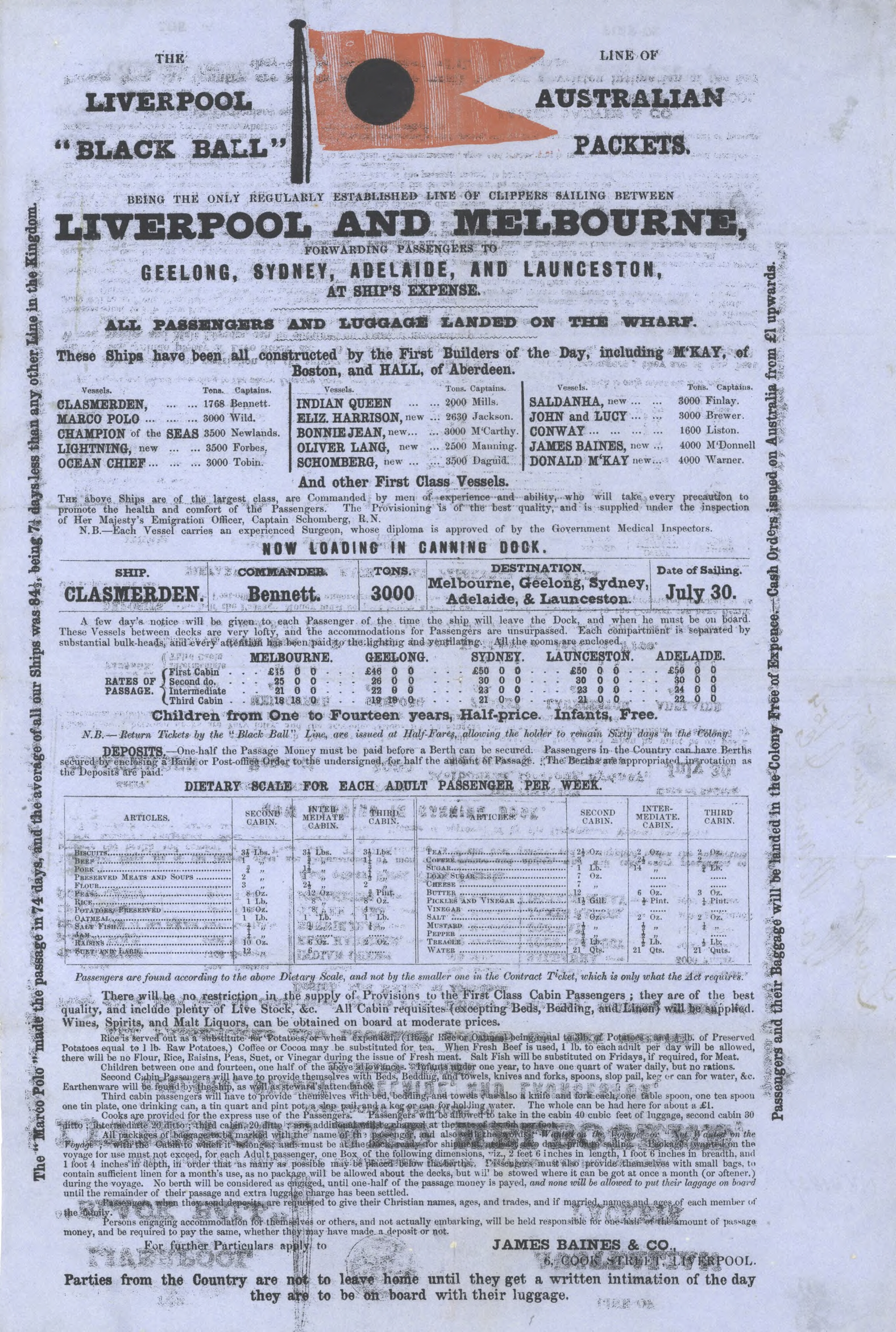
Black Ball Lines ad

The conditions on the Line's ships often were quite appalling. The ships were dirty and poorly ventilated. It was not uncommon to have 500 passengers cramped on one vessel. On one instance, there were documented 26 dead of the 460 passengers on board of Rockhampton, when she arrived in Keppel Bay on 12 October 1863 after the 116-day voyage from Liverpool.

=== Effect on immigration to Australia ===
The line carried more passengers to Australia than any other line. Just in 1865 and 1866 the Line brought 21,000 immigrants to Queensland. The overall traffic by the Line from England and Scotland to Queensland is estimated at 40,000 new settlers.

== Decline ==
In 1866, Barned's Banking Company Ltd collapsed during the 1866 financial market crisis. The Line was one of its main debtors and was forced to sell many of its ships. The crisis also affected the financial state of the Queensland Government, reducing its ability to financially sustain the flow of immigrants.

The Line carried on under the management of the successors of James Baines & Co., James Baines, Taylor & Co. and T. M. Mackay, Son & Co., relying on chartered ships to maintain its sailing business, but it finally ceased trading in 1871. Baines and his partners also owned several ships separate from each other.
