= James Watson Bain =

Canadian chemist (1875–1964)

James Watson Bain FRSC
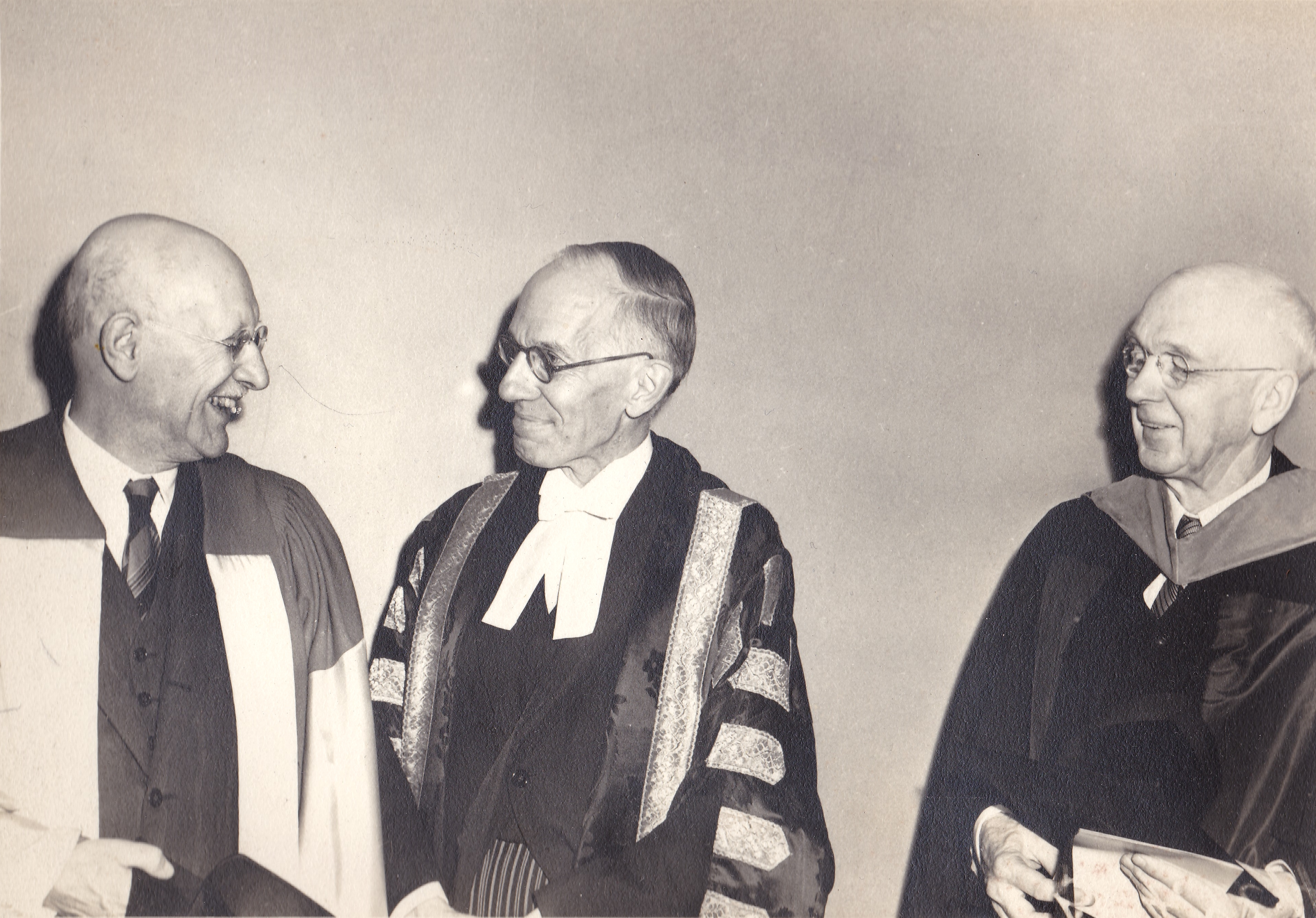
- Bain (left) with Vincent Massey, c. 1947-1953
- Born: 14 November 1875; London, England
- Died: 23 January 1964 (aged 88); Toronto, Ontario
- Education: University of Toronto
- Occupation: Chemist
- Awards: Society of Chemical Industry (Canada) medal
- Scientific career
- Workplaces: Chemical Institute of Canada, Society of Chemical Industry, Royal Canadian Institute

James Watson Bain (14 November 1875 – 23 January 1964) was a Canadian chemist at the University of Toronto. He is known as one of the founders of the first Canadian chemical society, the Canadian section of the Society of Chemical Industry, and as the first president of the Chemical Institute of Canada.

== Early life and education ==
Bain was born in London, England. He was the only son of James Bain, a bookseller, publisher and the first chief librarian of the Toronto Public Library. Following his graduation from Jarvis Collegiate Institute, Bain enrolled in mining engineering at the School of Practical Science at the University of Toronto.

== Career ==
Bain joined the university staff as a junior instructor in 1897, and following postgraduate work in Zurich, Switzerland, rose through the academic ranks to become professor of chemical engineering in 1916, and head of the department in 1920. During the First World War, he was granted a leave of absence to act as a liaison officer for the explosives program of the Canadian war mission in Washington, D.C. In 1932, he married Mary Edith Kilgour of the Kilgour family of Guelph.

Throughout his career, Bain served as an advisor and consultant to a variety of industries engaged in chemical operations, and was also involved in numerous professional societies. He was one of the founders of the Canadian section of the Society of Chemical Industry, the first Canadian chemical society. He was also one of the founders and the first president of the Canadian Institute of Chemistry, the forerunner of the Chemical Institute of Canada. He was president of the Royal Canadian Institute during its centenary year, 1948, and also a fellow of the Royal Society of Canada.

== Recognition ==
In 1947, Bain was presented with a portrait of himself painted by Kenneth Forbes, in recognition of his contribution to the field of chemical engineering.
