= Packet boat =

Medium-sized boat designed for domestic mail, passenger, and freight transportation

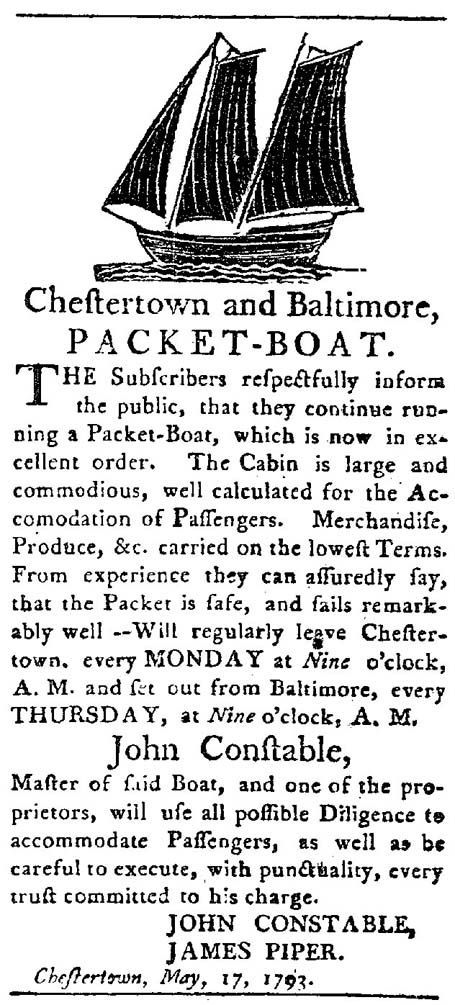
1793 newspaper ad for a packet schooner, Chestertown, Maryland

Packet boats were medium-sized boats designed mainly for domestic mail and freight transport in European countries and in North American rivers and canals. Eventually including basic passenger accommodation, they were used extensively during the 18th and 19th centuries, and had regularly scheduled services.

In the 18th century, packet boats were put into use on the Atlantic Ocean between Great Britain and its colonies, where the services were called the packet trade. In the later 19th century, steam-driven packets were used extensively in the United States on the Mississippi and Missouri rivers, servicing rivertowns such as St. Joseph, St. Paul, Galena and St. Louis and providing communication and supplies to be carried overland to more distant forts and trading posts.

== History ==
Packet craft were used extensively in European coastal mail services since the 17th century, and gradually added minimal passenger accommodation: "firing" (i.e. a place to cook), drinking water (often tasting of indigo or tobacco, which the water casks had previously held), and a place to sleep. Scheduled services began to be offered, but the time taken by journeys on sailing ships depended a lot on the weather.

In 1724, Daniel Defoe wrote about packet boats in his novel Roxana: The Fortunate Mistress. In the mid-18th century England, the King maintained a weekly packet service with the continent and Ireland using 15 packet vessels. Their importance is evident from the fact that the first craft built in the colony of New South Wales (in 1789) was the Rose Hill Packet.

Over the two centuries of the sailing packet craft development, they came in various rig configurations which included: schooners, schooners-brigs, sloops, cutters, brigs, brigantines, luggers, feluccas, galleys, xebecs, barques and their ultimate development in the clipper ships. Earlier they were also known as dispatch boats, but the service was also provided by privateers during time of war, and on occasion chartered private yachts. News of "record passages" was eagerly awaited by the public, and the craft's captain and crew were often celebrated in the press. Behind this search for sailing faster than the wind, however, lay the foundations for a development in naval architecture and its science which would serve until the appearance of the steam vessels.

In 1863, during the American Civil War, the packet boat Marshall carried the body of Confederate General Stonewall Jackson from Lynchburg to his home in Lexington, Virginia, for burial.

=== Canal packet boats ===
The American canal packet boats were typically narrow, about 14 ft (4 m), to accommodate canals, but might be 70–90 ft (21–27 m) long. When the Erie Canal opened in New York state in 1825 along the Mohawk River, demand quickly rose for travelers to be accommodated. Canal packet boats included cabin space for up to 60 passengers. Unlike European and American sailing vessels, that sought to attain greater speed under sail, the canal packet boats were drawn through the Erie Canal by teams of two or three horses or mules. Compared to overland travel, the boats cut journey time in half and were much more comfortable.

Travelers could get from New York City to Buffalo in ten days, with a combination of sailing and packet boats. Some passengers took the boats to see both the Erie Canal and the natural landscapes. Significantly, thousands of others used packet boats to emigrate to Ohio and other parts of the Midwest. These boats were also instrumental in the settling of and travel within Upstate New York through the branch canals such as the Chenango Canal. Packet boats were also popular along the James River and Kanawha Canal in Virginia, allowing travel beyond the falls upriver.

=== Atlantic packet ships ===
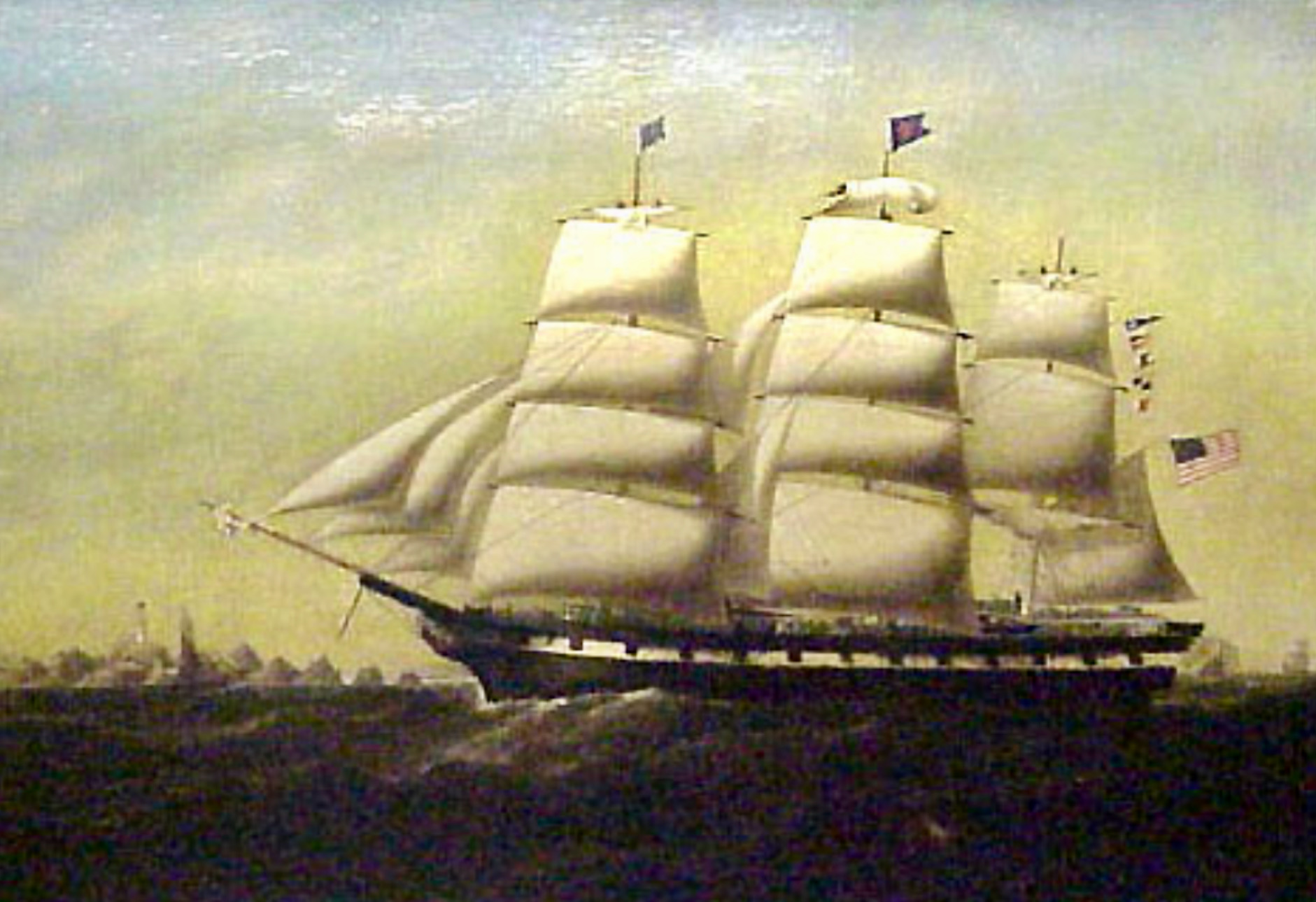
Princeton packet ship (1848).

Packets were the predecessors of the twentieth-century ocean liner and were the first to sail between American and European ports on regular schedules. The first company, the Black Ball Line (later the "Old Line") began operating 1 January 1818, offering a monthly service between New York and Liverpool with four ships. In 1821, Byrnes, Grimble & Co. inaugurated the Red Star Line of Liverpool Packets, with the four ships Panther, Hercules, Manhattan and Meteor. In 1822, Messrs. Fish, Grinnell, & Co. began the Swallowtail Line, known as the "Fourth Line of Packets for New York", their first ships being the Silas Richards, Napoleon, George, and York, which soon moved to bi-weekly service. By 1825, vessels were advertised as leaving New York on the 8th and leaving Liverpool on the 24th of every month. Their actual schedules eventually varied, sometimes wildly, due to weather and other conditions.

== Mail steamer ==
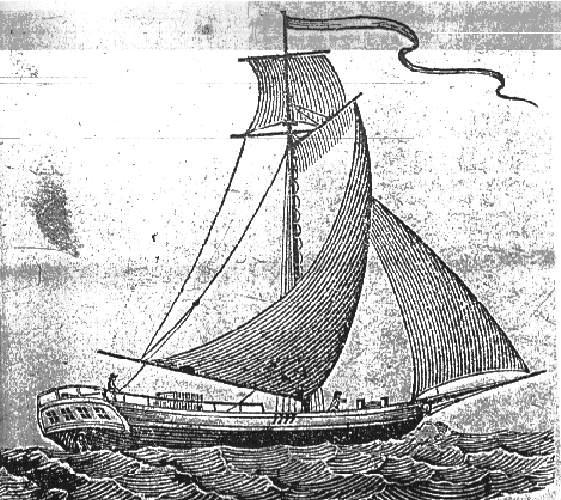
An 1825 book plate depicting a typical packet boat

Mail steamers were steamships which carried the mail across waterways, such as across an ocean or between islands, primarily during the 19th century and early 20th century, when the cost of sending a letter was declining to the point an ordinary person could afford the cost of sending a letter across great distances. In addition to carrying mail, most mail steamers carried passengers or cargo since the revenue from the mail service, if any, was insufficient by itself to pay for the cost of its travel.

However, the advantage for a steamship carrying mail was that its arrival would be advertised in advance in the newspapers, thus giving it "free advertising" as a travel option for passengers or cargo. In most cases, mail carried by mail steamers was delivered to the post office to which it was addressed. In some cases, the incoming mail would be advertised in the local newspaper for pickup at the post office or at the steamship's office for a fee, if not already fee-paid.

Occasionally, because of political instability when a post office could not provide normal services, incoming mail from a mail steamer would be delivered to a local delivery service, which would deliver the mail and charge the addressee an extra fee for the service. When this occurred, the local delivery service would place its own local service stamp or mark on the envelope when the extra fee was paid.

=== Universal Postal Union regulations ===
Mail carried by these steamers – sometimes known as paquebot mail – was subject to various regulations by the governments involved as well as the Universal Postal Union's (UPU) regulations stated at the UPU Vienna Conference of 1891.

== Aircraft namesake ==
The C-82 Packet twin-engined, twin-boom cargo aircraft designed and built by Fairchild Aircraft was named as a tribute to the packet boat. It was used by the United States Army Air Forces and its successor the United States Air Force following World War II.

== Commerce and journalism ==
Receiving information as quickly as possible—whether regarding particulars about trade, foreign markets, decision-making, professional partnerships, business documents, legal contracts, personal letters and political, government and military news—was of urgent importance to 19th century commerce. Industry and business made special arrangements to beat their competitors so that sailing ships, especially packet ships involved in the packet trade, emerged as the central information superhighway of the era, and for the development of journalism as well.

For instance, in late January 1840, the American Packet ship Patrick Henry arrived ahead of schedule and beat the competition to deliver the news from the continent for eager American readers. The Morning Herald (New York), 1 February, on the front page, reported: "The foreign news given today is highly important. Yesterday afternoon, about half past three, we received it at this office being a full hour before any of the Wall street papers had their's — and by five o'clock we issued an Extra, to gratify the immense crowd that surrounded our office. One of our clippers left town at 10 o'clock, and boarded the Patrick Henry outside the bar at about one o'clock."

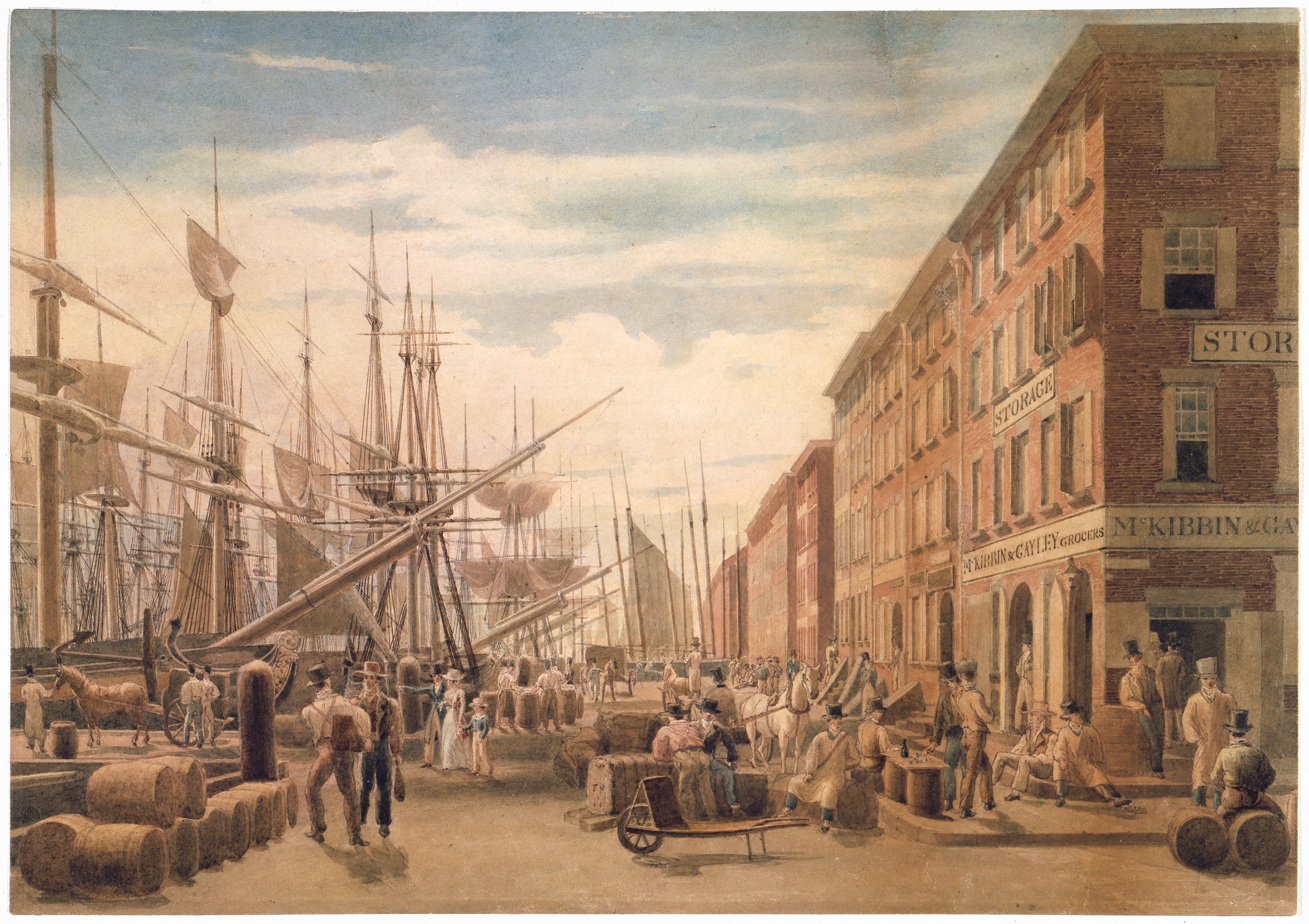
View of South Street, from Maiden Lane, where Patrick Henry (packet) docked

The news was advertised as "Ten Days Later From England—Highly Important" and included articles about war preparations by Russia, Queen Victoria's marriage that month, meetings of Parliament and the French Chamber, and the French King's speech.

"By the arrival of the Patrick Henry, Captain Delano, we have received immense files of English papers and periodicals, due to the 25th London, 26th from Liverpool and 23rd from Paris…Neither the Cambridge nor the Independence had arrived out on the 26th of Dec. The Patrick Henry had a fine run of nine days to the long(itude) of 38, where she took, on the 4th inst, strong westerly gales, which prevailed since that time without change."

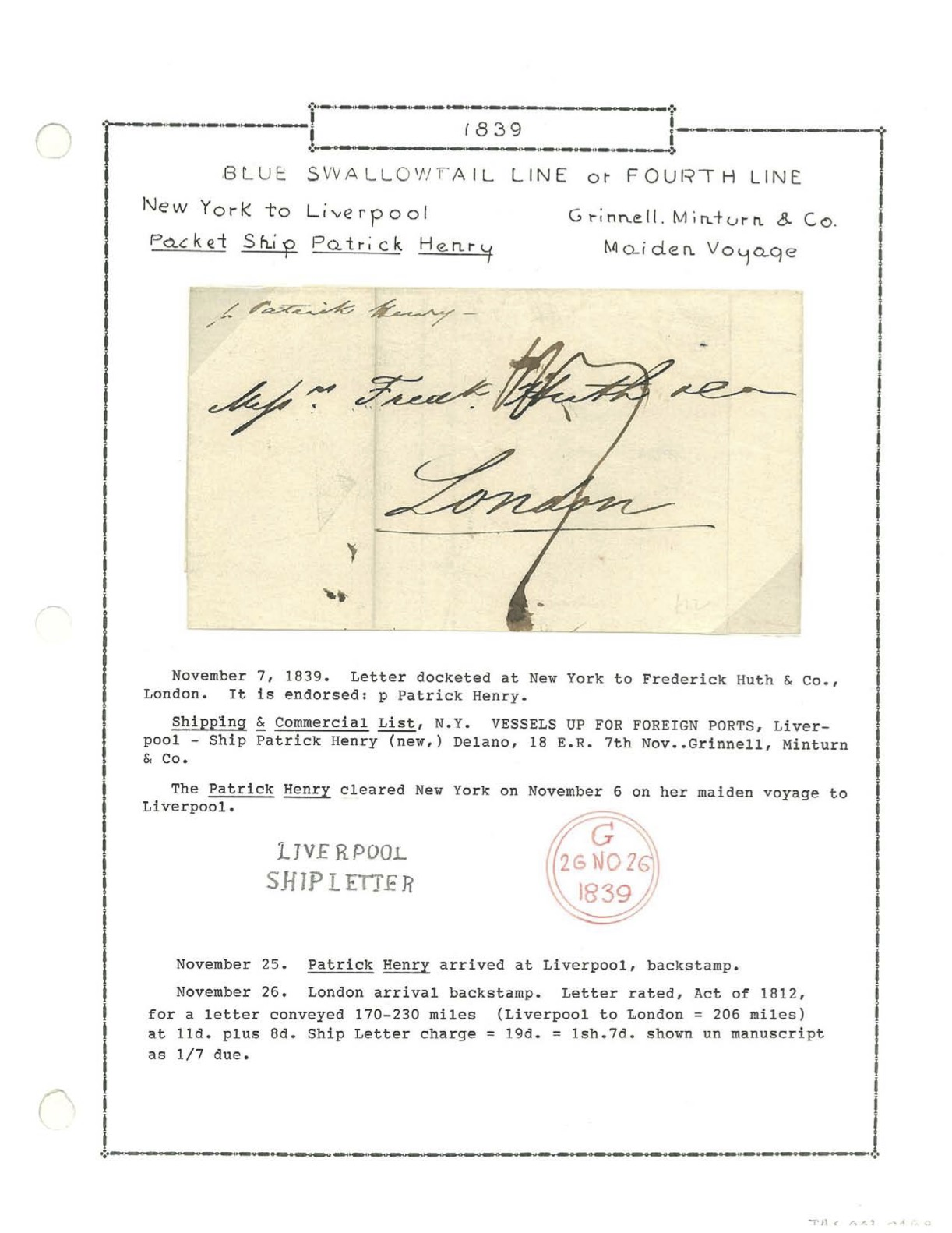
Display of letter on board her maiden voyage to England

Improvements in the speed of that communication was crucial for many commercial, financial and shipping business activities—speedier information made capital move faster, directly affecting world trade.

In 1840, the Patrick Henry was among twenty sailing packet ships on the New York–Liverpool run, and notably among the speediest. The short round trips, however, did not depend on speed, but rather changes in the schedule. Efficiency may have been improved by tightening schedules, but this may have exacerbated delays and errors of judgment.

For westbound sailings, there was a high risk of disaster. Nearly one packet in six was totally lost in service. This means that out of 6,000 crossings, about 22 ended in such wrecks. More than 600 British ships, of all types, were lost each year in between 1833 and 1835 and 1841 and 1842. The loss of lives varied between 1,450 and 1,560.

By the time of the maiden voyage of the Patrick Henry, in 1839, packet captains had begun taking more risks against their competitors as steamships were coming into service. Indeed most shipwrecks took place during the period when the competition between sail and steam was hardest. From a mail, business and journalism transmission point of view, the trend was most alarming.

Between 1838 and 1847 no less than 21 mail-carrying ships were lost on the North Atlantic route—two each year on average. Two of the ships were Falmouth packets and two were steamers, while 17 were American sailing packets. Eight were on the New York–Liverpool route, two on the Boston–Liverpool route, two on the New York–London route, and five on the New York–Havre route. Six of the ships just disappeared, and were lost with all hands. It is notable that two out of every three wrecks took place in November–February, indicating that the packet captains took too heavy risks, especially during the rough winter sailings. The only precautionary measure to ensure solid business information transmission across the Atlantic was to send duplicates. This was very typical during the shift period. The duplicates also ensured the fastest possible dispatch of information.

Most mail—especially eastwards—was still carried by sailing ships during the first decade after the advent of the transatlantic steamship service.

Even if the size of the sailing packets grew markedly, their service speed did not follow the trend after the introduction of steamships on the route in the late 1830s. After 1835, there seems to be no signs of speed improvements.

Another phenomenon which indicates that the sailing packets were losing their hold on the first class business—mail, fine freight and cabin passengers—was that they no longer cared about the punctuality of the sailing dates as much as they did in the 1830s. If the reliability of a mail ship service is measured by the regularity of sailings and the safety records, the performance of the American sailing packets in the mid-1840s was noticeably below such expectations.

== Gallery ==
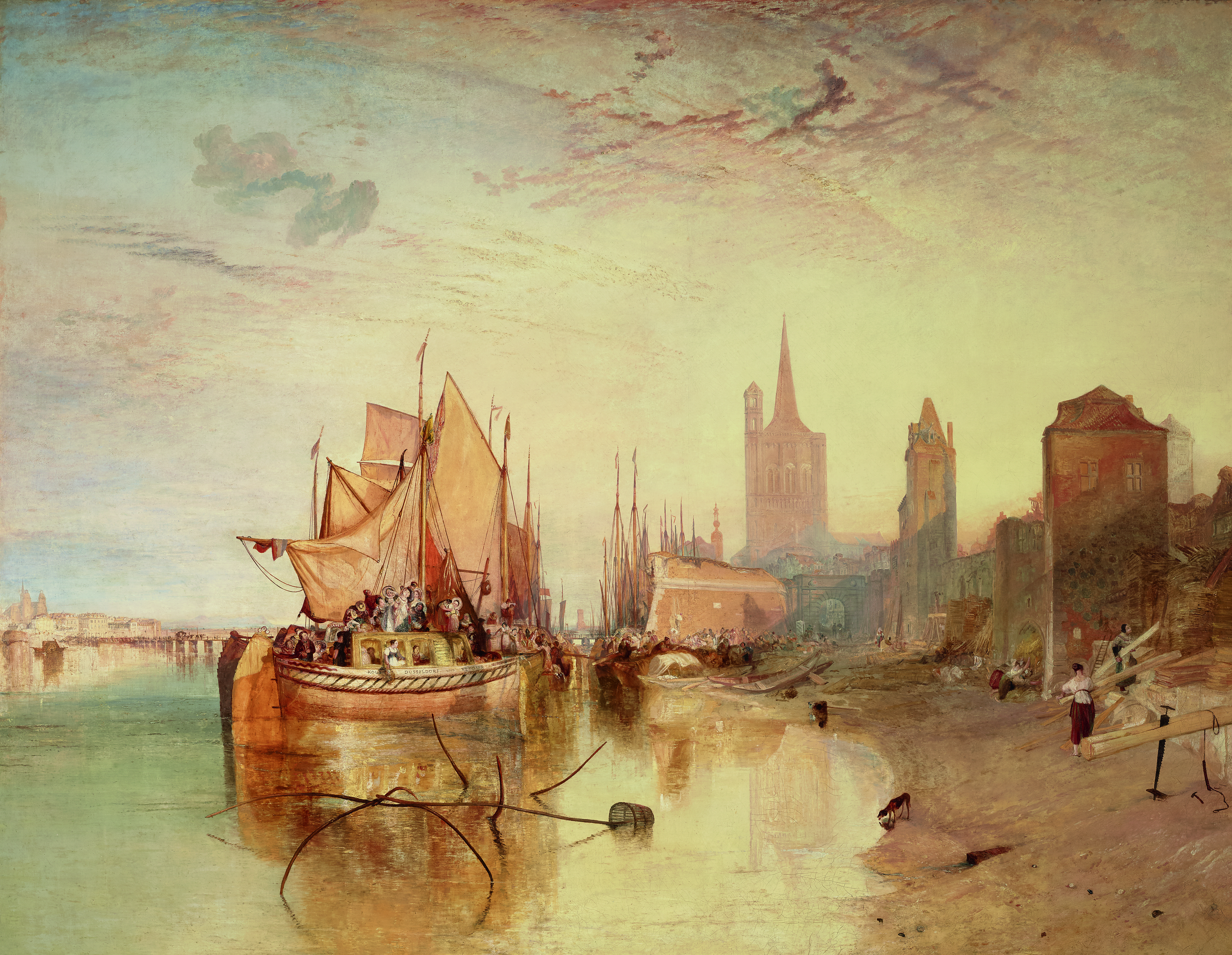
Cologne, the Arrival of a Packet Boat in the Evening by Turner, 1826

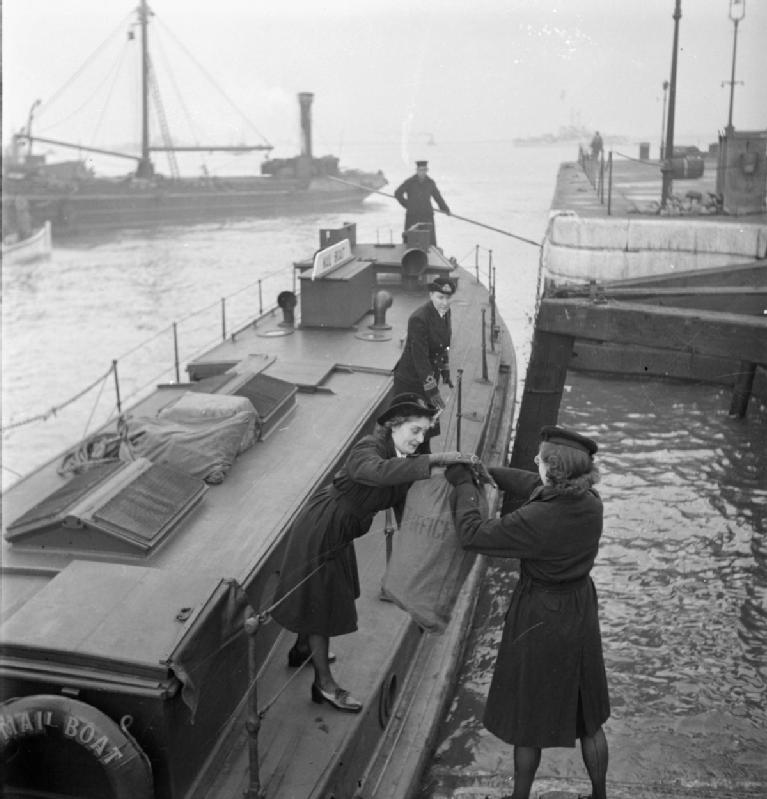
Wrens of the British Fleet Mail load the packet boat to deliver letters and parcels to the men on board ships moored nearby, 1944

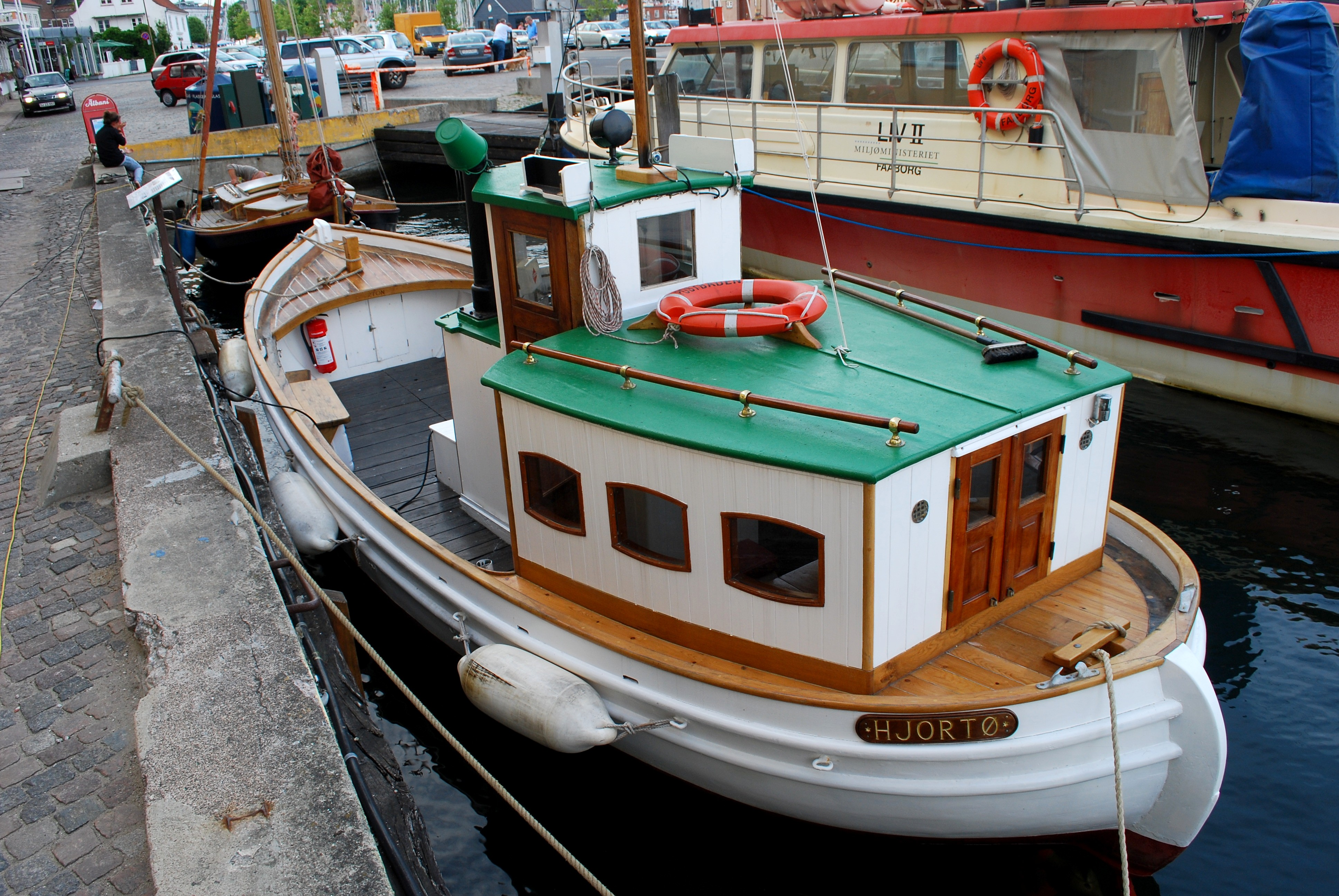
Packet boat Hjortø in the harbour of Svendborg, Denmark, 2010

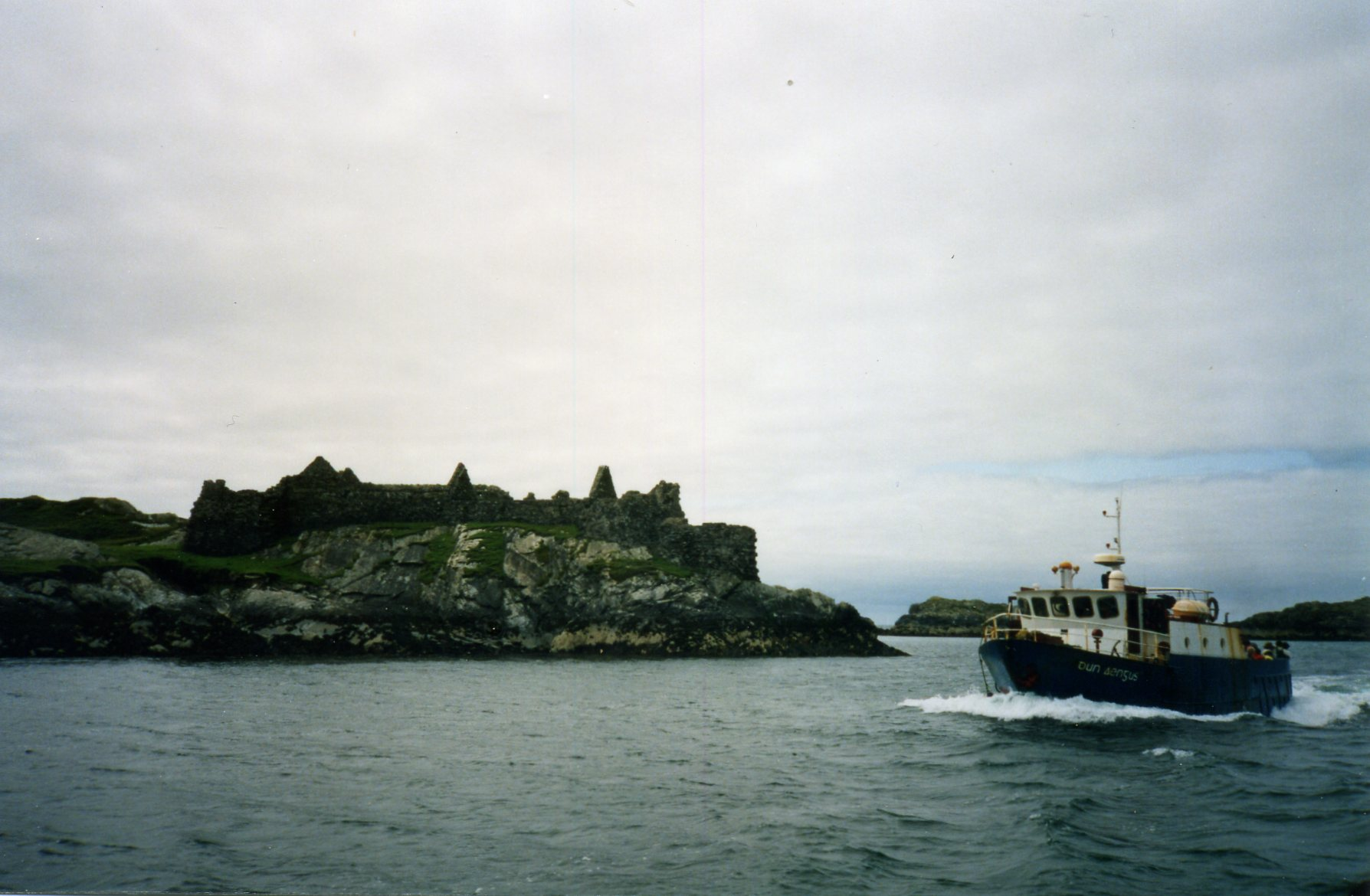
The Dun Aengus Mail boat sailing from Cleggan to Inishbofin, Ireland, 2012

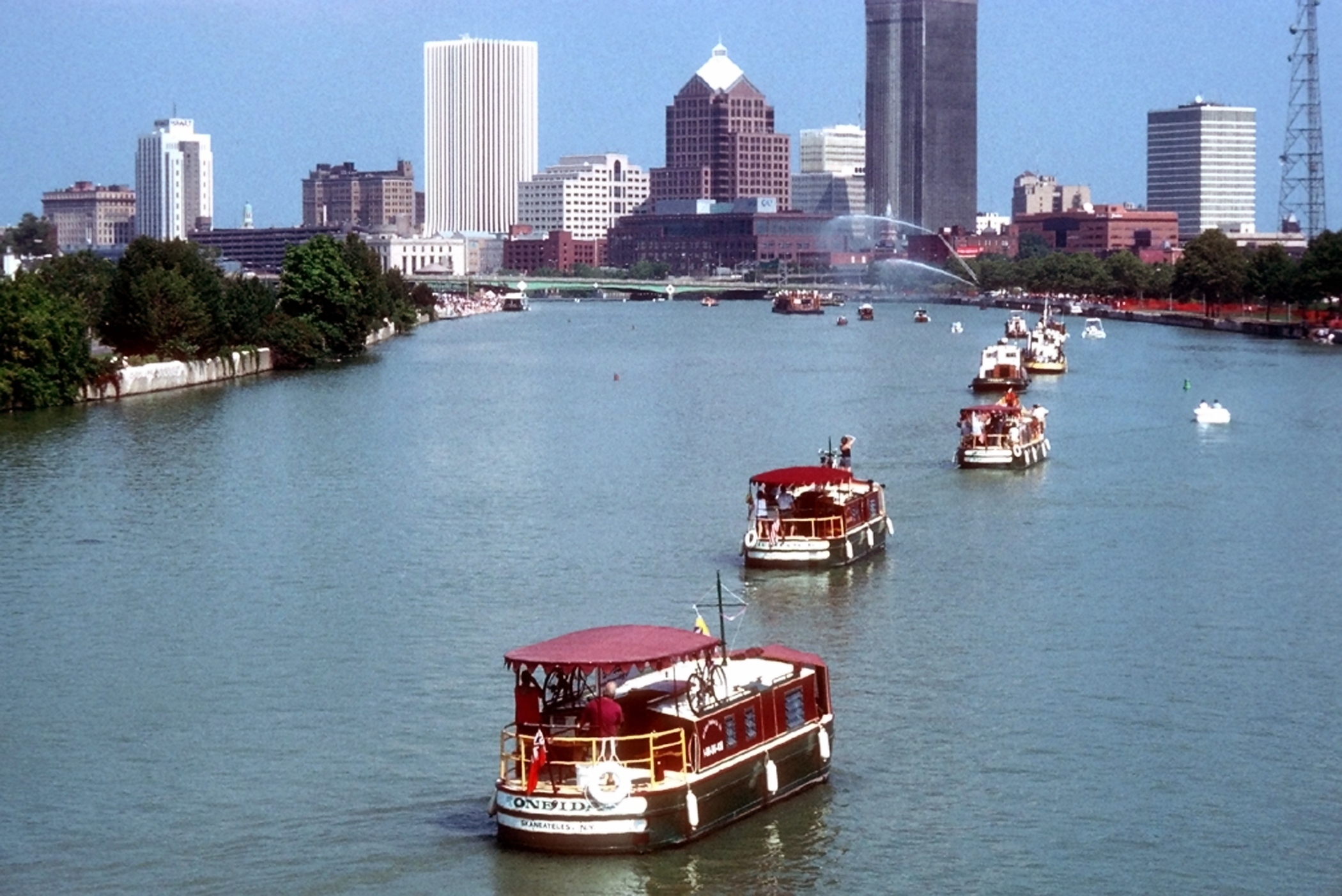
Packet boats on the Genesee River, with the Rochester skyline in the background, USA, c.2005

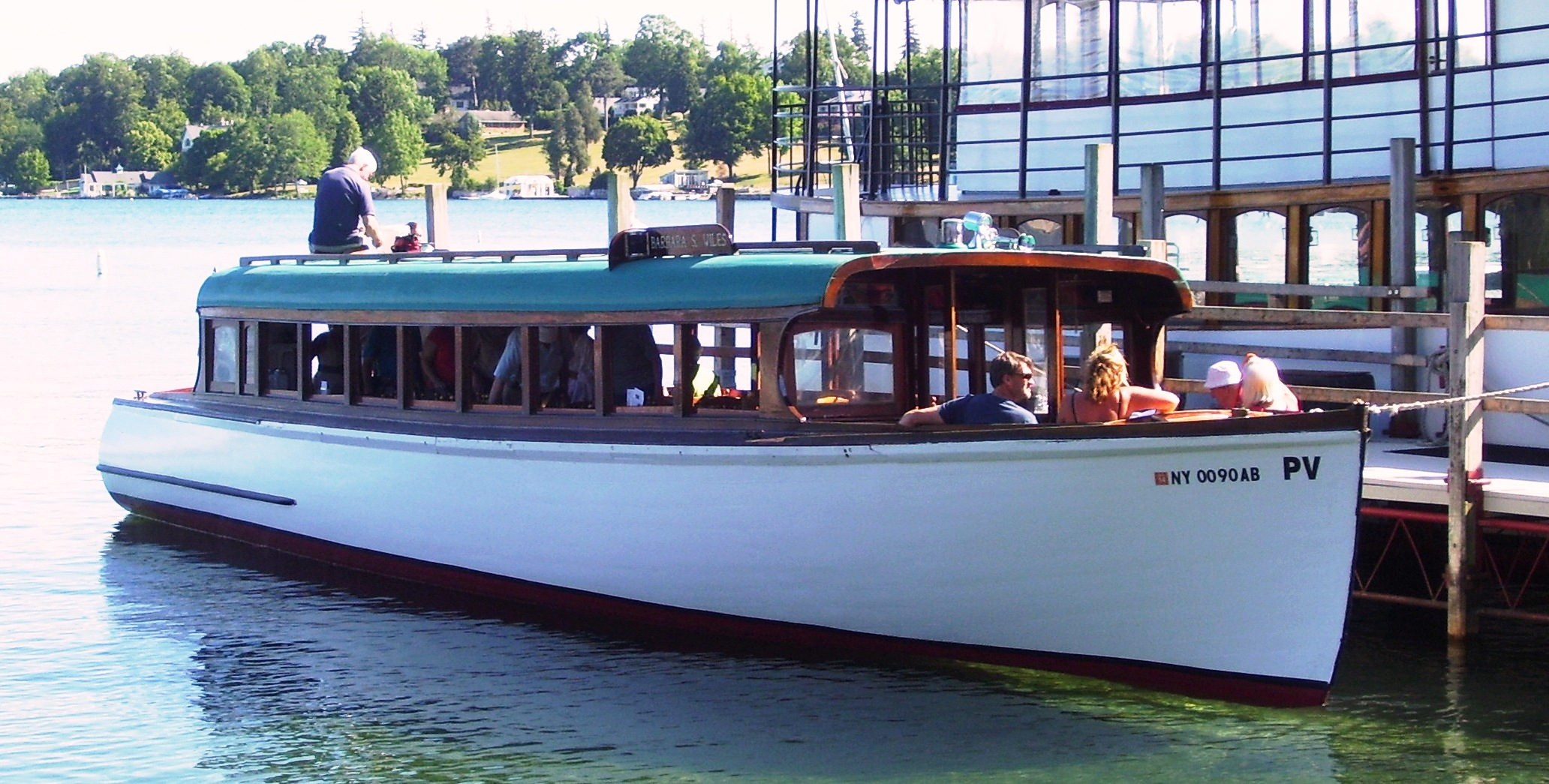
The Skaneateles Lake mailboat docked at Clift Park in Skaneateles, New York, USA, 2012

== See also ==
- Allan Line Royal Mail Steamers
- Black Ball Line (trans-Atlantic packet)
- Flagey building in Brussels, nicknamed "Packet Boat"
- Ocean liner
- Pony Express
- Postal history
- Royal Mail Ship
