= Alexander Newlands =

Alexander Newlands CBE M.Inst.C.E., (11 January 1870 - 28 August 1938) was chief engineer of the London, Midland and Scottish Railway from 1927 to 1933.

== Family ==
Newlands was born at Elgin on 11 January 1870 at Lhanbryde, Morayshire, the son of Alexander Newlands of Pondpark, Elgin, and Annie Grant. He married Bessie Hamilton McGilchrist, third daughter of the late Rev. John McGilchrist of Bowmore, Islay in 1900. They had three daughters. He died in Glasgow on 28 August 1938.

== Career ==
Newlands was educated at West End school, Elgin. He then served a pupilage with Messrs. Gordon and MacBey and in 1892 joined the Highland Railway in the engineering department in Inverness, and was engaged in parliamentary surveys for the Kyle extension of the Dingwall and Skye section of the line.

In 1893, he was made resident engineer on these works which were completed in 1897. In 1897 he was made resident engineer on the widening of the Highland Main Line from Blair Atholl northwards to Dalwhinnie. In 1899, he was appointed Chief Assistant, and in 1901 Assistant Engineer, finally being promoted to Engineer in Chief in 1914.

When the Highland Railway became part of the London Midland and Scottish Railway System in 1921 he became Divisional Engineer in Inverness. In 1924 was transferred to the Crewe Division. He was appointed Chief Civil Engineer of the London, Midland and Scottish Railway on 1 February 1927, retiring on 1 July 1933.

He served as a member of the Board of Trade Water-Power Resources Committee and of the Water-Power Section of the Conjoint Board of Scientific Societies. He received the C.B.E. in 1920.

He was elected an Associate Member of The Institution of Civil Engineers in 1895, and was transferred to the class of Member in 1912. He was elected a Member of Council in November 1931. In 1926, he was President of the Permanent Way Institution. He was also a Member of the American Railway Engineering Association and of the Institution of Water Engineers. He was a Justice of the Peace for Inverness-shire.

== Publications ==
- The Scottish Railway. A Sketch of their Growth and Development 1921
- The British Railways. 1936
