= James Bain (librarian) =

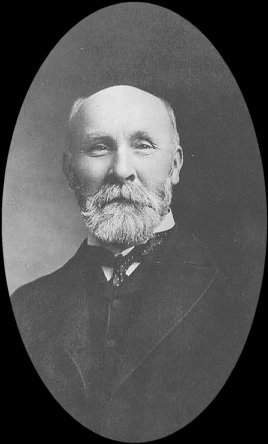
- Born: August 2, 1842; London, England
- Died: May 22, 1908 (aged 65); Toronto, Ontario, Canada
- Occupation: librarian

James Bain (August 2, 1842 – May 22, 1908) was a Scottish-Canadian bookseller, publisher, and librarian. Born in London, England, his family emigrated to Toronto when he was 6 years old. After completing his education at the Toronto Grammar School, he went to work for his father who was a stationer and bookseller. He was active in the publishing industry both in England and in Canada, joining the firm John Nimmo & Son which later became Nimmo & Bain. He returned to Canada in 1882. After managing the fledgling Canada Publishing Company, Bain was selected in 1883 to become the first chief librarian of the Toronto Public Library. He held this position until his death in 1908.

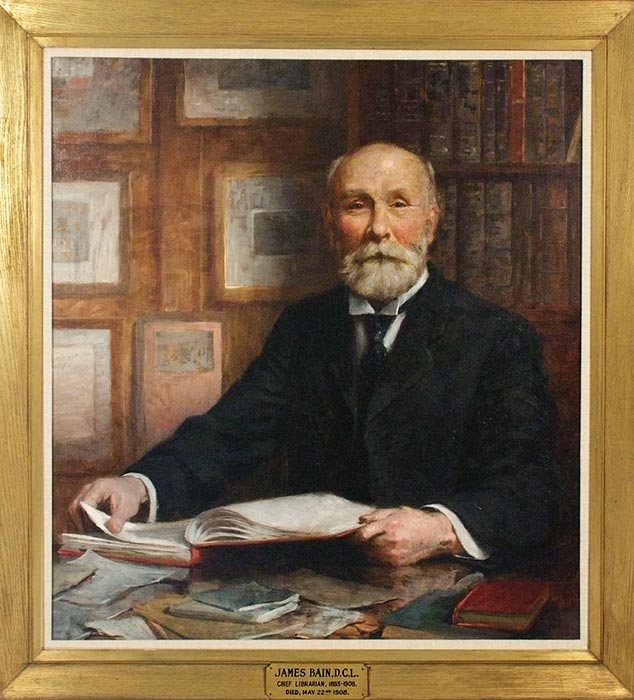
Colour portrait of James Bain by Edmund Wyly Grier, commissioned by the Board of the Toronto Public Library in 1909.

As chief librarian, he was occupied with building both the library's collection and new branches. Acquiring the library's first collection took some diplomacy on his part, since in the 1880s fiction was controversial. In the campaign to establish a free library, some of the opposition had argued against it on the grounds that taxes shouldn't be used to circulate novels. While the library did acquire novels, the bulk of the collection was more serious. He was particularly concerned with ensuring that the library's collection include "every work of any consequence" in the fields of Canadian history and literature. The first building space and book collection for the library came from the Toronto Mechanics' Institute, who had opened a subscription library in 1833. The collection was supplemented by $15,000 worth of books that Bain acquired on a trip to England in late 1883. Bain welcomed patrons to the first Toronto Public Library in the Mechanics' Institute in 1884. Two branches, Northern and Western, also opened that year, with Eastern following in 1888, Dundas in 1889 and College in 1900.

In 1903, Bain secured Carnegie funding to build a new central library (now the Koffler Student Centre at the University of Toronto) and three branches, Yorkville, Queen and Lisgar, and Riverdale. After his death, the library received a second Carnegie grant to build more branches. Seven of the ten Carnegie libraries are still open as branches of the Toronto Public Library.

He helped found the Ontario Library Association, serving as president of the preliminary committee for 1900 and as its president for 1901 and 1902. He was also a founding member of the Champlain Society and held the role of Treasurer and was the president of the Royal Canadian Institute from 1900 to 1902.

His son was James Watson Bain.

== See also ==
- List of Carnegie libraries in Canada
