= Lightning (clipper) =

Clipper ship

Coordinates: 38°8′24″S 144°22′7″E

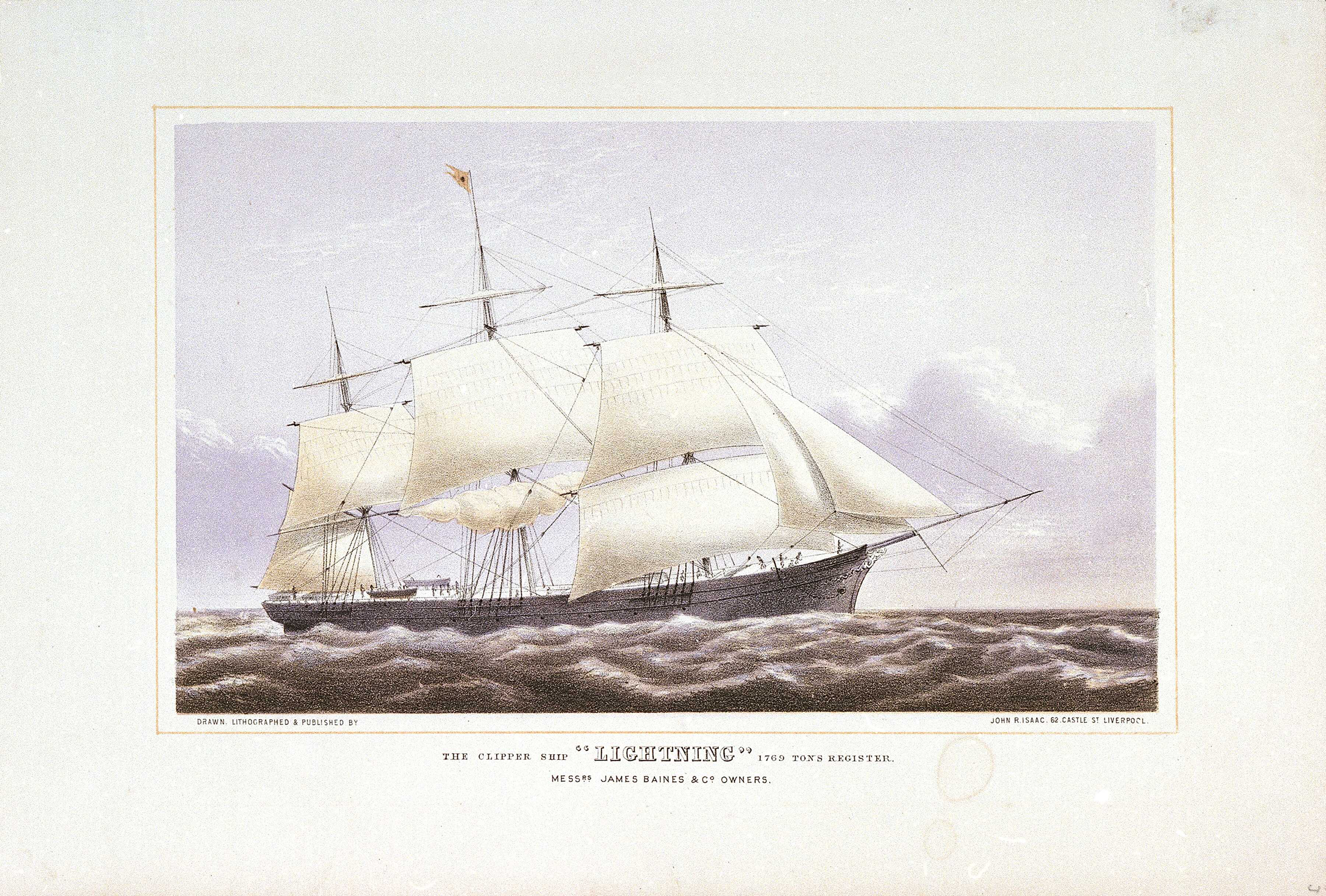
- "Clipper Ship Lightning"

History

United Kingdom
- Owner: James Baines & Co.
- Ordered: 1853
- Builder: Donald McKay
- Cost: £32,000
- Laid down: 1854, January 3rd; Donald McKay shipyard, East Boston
- Launched: 3 January 1854
- Christened: 3 January 1854
- Acquired: British Merchant Navy
- Commissioned: 18 February 1854
- Maiden voyage: 18 February – 3 March 1854 to Liverpool
- In service: 18 February 1854
- Out of service: 31 October 1869
- Home port: Liverpool
- Fate: Scuttled 31 October 1869 at Geelong, Australia

General characteristics
- Class & type: full-rigged three-masted sailing ship (clipper rigging); cargo clipper ship
- Type: Clipper
- Tonnage: 2,084 GRT
- Tons burthen: 3.500 tons
- Length: hull: 230 ft (70 m), 244 ft (74 m) (LOA)
- Beam: 44 ft (13 m)
- Height: 164 ft (50 m) main mast (deck to truck)
- Draught: 23 ft (7.0 m) loaded
- Propulsion: Sails
- Sail plan: 13,000 yards of canvas when under all plain sail
- Speed: 19 kn (35 km/h); best 24-hour run: 436 nautical miles (807 km) in 1854
- Boats & landing craft carried: 6 lifeboats
- Capacity: 1,450 tons cargo
- Complement: 100 crew

Lightning was a clipper ship, one of the last large clippers to be built in the United States. She was built by Donald McKay for James Baines of the Black Ball Line, Liverpool, for the Australia trade.

== History ==
When Lightning was built in 1854 in Boston, Designed to meet transportation demand for the developing Australian gold rush. McKay built the ship in Boston Massachusetts for James Baines of the Black Ball Line (house flag featured a black disk ("ball") on a red background) in Liverpool. Baines needed to transport passengers and cargo to Australia and had been impressed by the large American ships. Lightning was constructed to handle the heavy seas and storms of the Australian run. She cost £30,000 to build, and Baines put in another £2,000 in interior decoration, adding fine woods, marble, gilding and stained glass. It is said that her rooms rivaled those of the later Queen Mary. An on-ship newspaper called the Lightning Gazette was published for the passengers and crew.

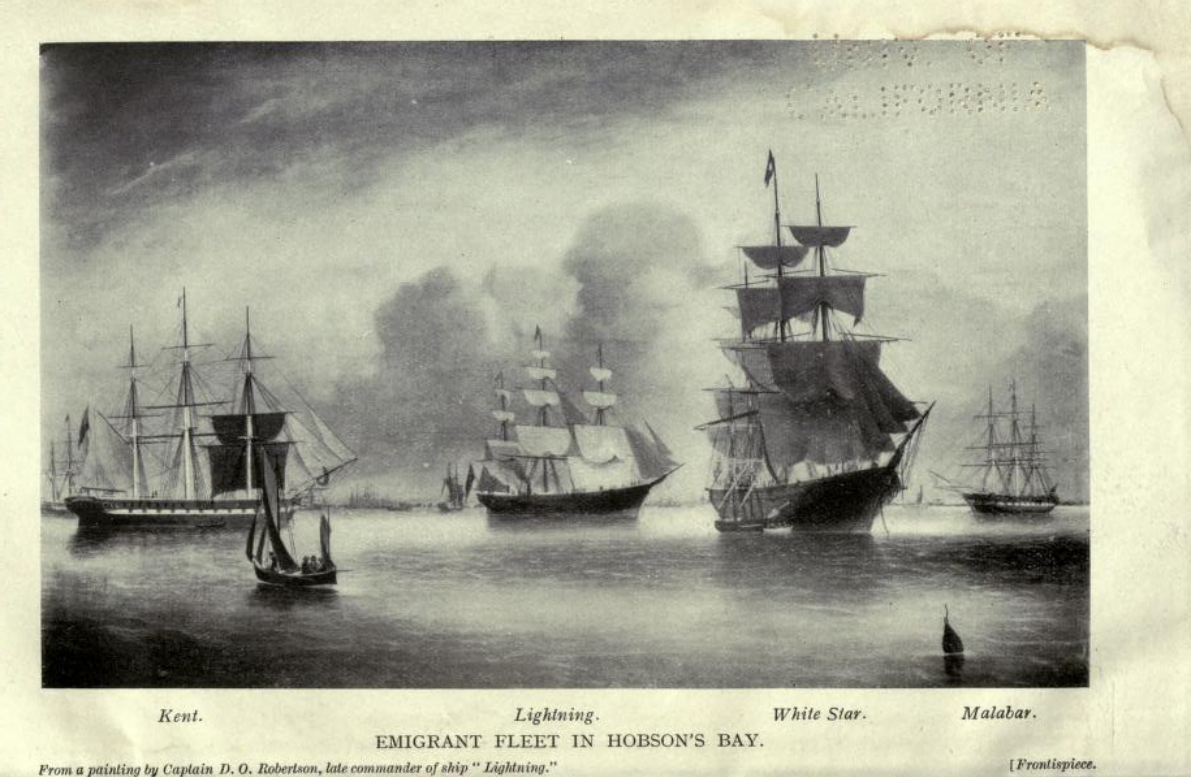
Emigrant fleet (Kent, Lightning, White Star, Malabar) in Hobson's bay by D.O. Robertson

Lightning set records during her sailings. She crossed from New York to Liverpool in 13 days, 19½ hours, and she sailed 436 nautical miles (807 km) in 24 hours, doing 18 to 18½ knots. In 1854–55, she made the passage from Melbourne to Liverpool in 65 days, completing a circumnavigation of the world in 5 months, 9 days, which included 20 days spent in port.

Lightning did a brief stint as a troop ship, taking British soldiers from England to India to fight the 1857 Indian Mutiny.

In 1867, she was purchased by Thomas Harrison of Liverpool, but continued to sail for the Black Ball Line.

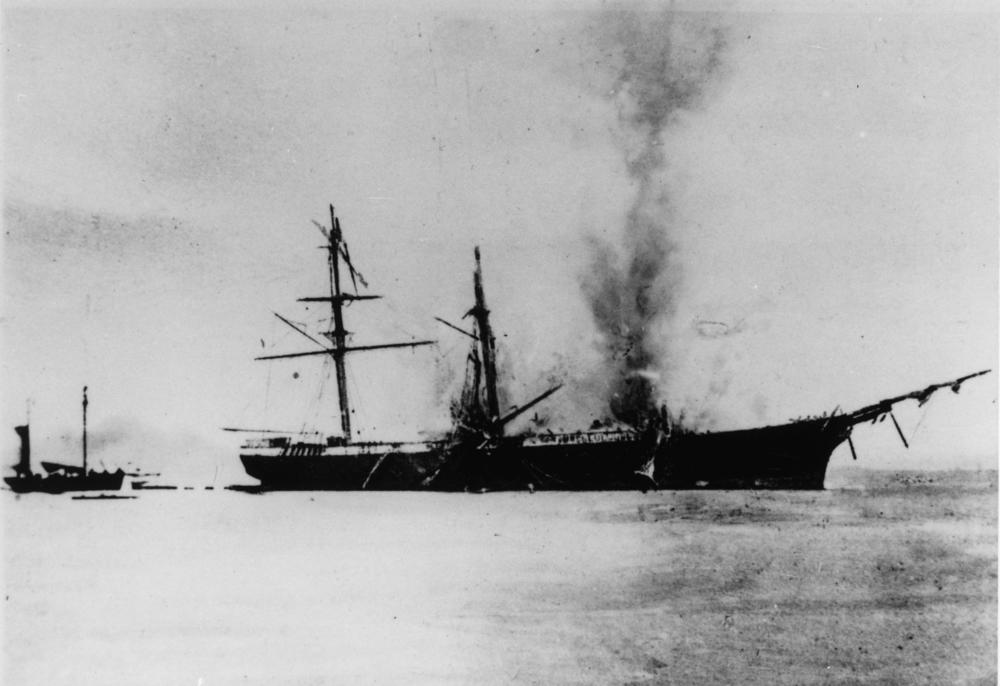
Lightning on fire

At around 01:00 on 30 October 1869, Lightning caught fire at Geelong in Australia, when she was fully loaded and ready to sail with 4,300 bales of wool, 200 tons of copper, 35 casks of wine, and some tallow. Attempts to control the fire were unsuccessful, the decision was made to sink her. She was towed out to the shoals in Corio Bay where initial attempts to hole her below the waterline with cannon fire from the shore were unsuccessful. At about four in the afternoon the crew scuttled her by cutting holes on the waterline, and she sank in 25 feet (7.6 m) of water.
