= James Baines (merchant) =

British merchant

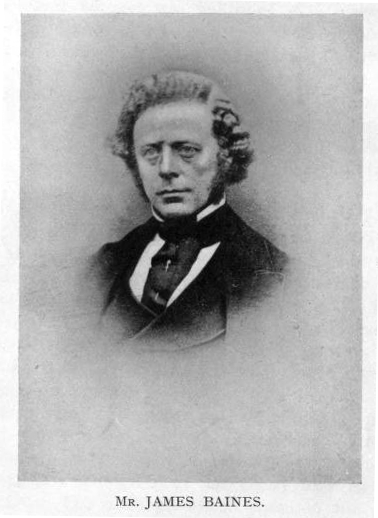
- Born: 1822; Liverpool, England
- Died: 8 March 1889 (aged 66–67)
- Occupations: Shipbroker, merchant
- Known for: James Baines & Co. and the Liverpool Black Ball line between England and Australia
- Spouse: Anne Netherton
- Children: 2

James Baines (1822 – 8 March 1889) was a British merchant, shipowner and shipbroker by trade. He became famous as the founder of James Baines & Co. that ran a fleet of 86 ships on the Liverpool Black Ball line between England and Australia in 1851–1871.

== Early life ==
He was born in Upper Duke Street, Liverpool, the son of William Baines and Mary Picton. He married Anne Netherton in 1848 and had two daughters. After her husband died in 1829, his mother ran a very successful confectionery manufacturing business which provided a wedding cake for the Royal Family. This may have been the source of some of the funds Baines used to set up his shipping business in 1851.

== The Liverpool Black Ball Line ==
At the peak of his success the Black Line had 86 ships and over the course of its existence carried some ten thousands of immigrants to Australia, more than any other line at the time.

After the cessation of the Black Ball Line in 1871, James Baines operated four ships under his own name.
