= List of ship launches in 1851 =

The list of ship launches in 1851 includes a chronological list of some ships launched in 1851.

Date	Ship	Class	Builder	Location	Country	Notes
4 January	Ino	Extreme clipper	Perrine, Patterson & Stack	Williamsburg, New York	United States	For Sifkin & Ironside.
4 January	Marion Macintyre	Clipper	Messrs. Jordan & Getty	Liverpool	United Kingdom	For Messrs. L. H. Macintyre & Co.
7 January	Juno	Paddle steamer	Messrs. Alexander Hall & Sons	Aberdeen	United Kingdom	For private owner.
16 January	Charlemagne	Third rate		Toulon	France	For French Navy.
18 January	Anne Logan	Barque	Messrs. R. Wood & Sons	Maryport	United Kingdom	For John Logan.
18 January	Abbott	Barque	Stiven	location	United Kingdom	For Mr. Dickson.
18 January	Isabella Scott	Brig	Messrs. Chisholm, Simpson, Peter & Co.	Arbroath	United Kingdom	For Scott & Cooper.
18 January	The Monarchy	Merchantman	Messrs. P. Challoner & Sons	Liverpool	United Kingdom	For Messrs. Brown & Harrison and Messrs. James Browne & Co.
18 January	The Shand	Merchantman	Clarke	Liverpool	United Kingdom	For Mr. Shand and others.
19 January	Constitución	Corvette	Juan Duprat Shipyard	Valparaíso	Chile	For Chilean Navy.
21 January	Anna Dorothea	Merchantman	Messrs. Brr & Sherer	Ardrossan	United Kingdom	For Barbor & Rotheron.
21 January	Gazelle	Extrene clipper	William H. Webb	New York	United States	For Taylor & Merrill.
21 January	Golden Gate	Steamship	William H. Webb	New York	United States	For private owner.
21 January	Isaac Bell	Packet ship	William H. Webb	New York	United States	For private owner.
January	Eclipse	Clipper	Jabez Williams	Williamsburg, New York	United States	For Thomas Wardle and Booth & Edgar.
January	Erromanga	Barque		Sunderland	United Kingdom	For R. Hansell.
January	McLaren	Snow	Ratcliffe & Co., or Ratcliffe & Spence	Sunderland	United Kingdom	For J. Tindell.
January	Morning Star	Merchantman	Buchanan & Gibson	Sunderland	United Kingdom	For J. Gibson.
January	Palmyra	Snow	Richard Wilkinson	Sunderland	United Kingdom	For Mr. Thompson.
January	Staghound	Clipper	D. McKay	East Boston, Massachusetts	United States	For Messrs George E. Upton and Sampson & Tappan.
3 February	Abergeldie	Clipper	Messrs. Walter Hood & Co.	Aberdeen	United Kingdom	For George Leslie.
4 February	Admiral Grenfell	Barque	George Cox	Bideford	United Kingdom	For private owner.
5 February	N.B. Palmer	Extreme clipper	Westervelt & Mackay	New York	United States	For A.A. Low & Brother.
5 February	Taymouth Castle	Full-rigged ship	Messrs. John Scott & Sons	Greenock	United Kingdom	For Glasgow & Calcutta Line.
8 February	Milenka	Barque	Messrs. Thompson & Kirwan	Belfast	United Kingdom	For private owner.
8 February	Racer	Clipper	Currier & Townsend	Newburyport, Massachusetts	United States	For Red Cross Line.
8 February	Shooting Star	Clipper	James O. Curtis	Medford, Massachusetts	United States	For Reed, Wade & Co.
9 February	Eureka	Extreme clipper	Jacob A. Westervelt	New York	United States	For Chambers & Heiser.
15 February	Braganza	Full-rigged ship	Messrs. Kennedy & Co.	Whitehaven	United Kingdom	For Messrs. A. W. Lyons.
16 February	Dawsons	Snow	Bowman and Drummond	Blyth	United Kingdom	For Dawson & Shepherd.
17 February	Arabian	Steamship	Messrs. Napier	Glasgow	United Kingdom	For Glasgow and Liverpool Shipping Company, or Messrs. Henry Dixon & Co.
18 February	City of London	Barque	Messrs. Barclay and Curle.	Glasgow	United Kingdom	For private owner.
18 February	James Booth	Full-rigged ship	Messrs. A. Duthie & Co.	Aberdeen	United Kingdom	For private owner.
18 February	John Buchanan	Barque	Robert Innes	Leith	United Kingdom	For private owner.
18 February	Typhoon	Extreme clipper	Fernald & Pettigrew	Portsmouth, New Hampshire	United States	For D. & A. Kingsland & Co.
18 February	Uruguay	Merchantman	John Westacott	Barnstaple	United Kingdom	For Messrs. Dennison, or Messrs. James Poole & Company.
19 February	Shapere	Steamship	Messrs. White	Cowes	United Kingdom	For Ottoman Government.
February	Prince Arthur	Paddle steamer	Messrs. Miller, Ravenhill & Co.	Blackwall	United Kingdom	For Dublin and Holyhead Steam Packet Company.
February	Mansaniello	Barque	Booth & Blakelock	Sunderland	United Kingdom	For Mr. Huntley.
February	Ulrica	Snow	Austin & Mills	Sunderland	United Kingdom	For Austin & Co.
3 March	Chowringhee	Full-rigged ship	William Pile Jr.	Sunderland	United Kingdom	For John Hay.
3 March	Lucy	Merchantman	Robert Thompson & Sons	Sunderland	United Kingdom	For White & Co.
5 March	Herald	Paddle Steamer	Messrs. John Reid & Co.	Port Glasgow	United Kingdom	For private owner.
5 March	Hilda	Brig	Thomas Hopkirk	Whitby	United Kingdom	For Messrs. Leng, Weightt, and Harrison.
17 March	Chrysolite	Full-rigged ship	Messrs. Hall	Footdee	United Kingdom	For private owner.
17 March	Rip van Winkle	Packet ship		Somerset, New York	United States	For Messrs. Eagle & Co.
17 March	Margaret Ritchie	Brig	Tay Shipbuilding Company	Dundee	United Kingdom	For private owner.
18 March	Miranda	Sloop-of-war	Fincham	Sheerness Dockyard	United Kingdom	For Royal Navy.
18 March	Sans Pareil	Second rate		Devonport Dockyard	United Kingdom	For Royal Navy.
19 March	Humility	Snow	Bowman and Drummond	Blyth	United Kingdom	For Simpson & Co.
19 March	Southern Cross	Medium clipper	E. & H. O. Briggs	East Boston, Massachusetts	United States	For Baker & Morrill.
20 March	Orontes	Steamship	Messrs. Denny Bros.	Dumbarton	United Kingdom	For Messrs. James Moss & Co.
25 March	Mystery	Brigantine	J. B. Mansfield	Teignmouth	United Kingdom	For Mr. Boden.
31 March	Barracouta	Paddle sloop		Pembroke Dockyard	United Kingdom	For Royal Navy.
March	Axe	Schooner	Taylor & Son	Sunderland	United Kingdom	For Taylor & Son.
2 April	The Betsey	Barque	William Briggs	Galmpton Kiln	United Kingdom	For private owner.
4 April	Falkland	Paddle steamer		Bombay	India	For private owner.
5 April	Pioneer	Steamship	Jacob Bell	New York	United States	For Messrs. Spofford, Tileston & Co.
5 April	Witch of the Wave	Extreme clipper	George Raynes	Portsmouth, New Hampshire	United States	For Glidden & Williams, East Boston.
15 April	Flying Cloud	Extreme clipper	Donald McKay	East Boston, Massachusetts	United States	For Grinnell, Minturn & Co.
16 April	Eliza	Barque	Webster	Fraserburgh	United Kingdom	For Charles McBeath and others.
16 April	Keera	Steamship	Thomas Toward	Newcastle upon Tyne	United Kingdom	For H. G. Smith.
16 April	Martha Gertrude	Smack		Amlwch	United Kingdom	For private owner.
16 April	Ocean Monarch	Schooner		Amlwch	United Kingdom	For private owner.
16 April	Prince Arthur	Steamship	Messrs. Tod & McGregor	Partick	United Kingdom	For Cork and Queenstown Steam Boat Company.
16 April	Roseina	Schooner		Amlwch	United Kingdom	For private owner.
17 April	Baron Osy	Paddle steamer	Robinson & Russell	Limehouse	United Kingdom	For Antwerp Steam Navigation Company.
17 April	Dinapore	East Indiaman	Lamport	Workington	United Kingdom	For Messrs. W. S. Lindsay & Co.
17 April	Indus	Steamship		Bombay	India	For British East India Company.
23 April	Blue Bell	Yacht	Mansfield	Teignmouth	United Kingdom	For private owner.
23 April	Captain Roebuck	Yacht	Mansfield	Teignmouth	United Kingdom	For private owner.
23 April	Yachting	Yacht	Mansfield	Teignmouth	United Kingdom	For private owner.
26 April	Prince of Wales	Model frigate		Woolwich Dockyard	United Kingdom	For Royal Navy; exhibited on The Serpentine as part of the Great Exhibition.
30 April	Valorous	Magicienne-class frigate		Pembroke Dockyard	United Kingdom	For Royal Navy.
April	Felicity	Barque	W. Spowers	Sunderland	United Kingdom	For Mr. Robinson.
April	Jason	Snow	Austin & Mills	Sunderland	United Kingdom	For Mr. Graydon.
April	Saxon Maid	Barque	W. Petrie	Sunderland	United Kingdom	For Bradley & Co.
1 May	Syren	Medium clipper	John Taylor	Medford, Massachusetts	United States	For Silsbee & Pickman.
1 May	Helen	Yacht		Woodbridge	United Kingdom	For G. E. Manby.
1 May	Zenobia	Paddle frigate		Bombay	India	For British East India Company's Bombay and Suez Line.
3 May	America	Yacht	William H. Brown	New York	United States	For John Cox Stevens.
3 May	Beatrice	Schooner	Charles Fort	Gosport	United Kingdom	For private owner.
3 May	Eagle	Extreme clipper	Perine, Patterson & Stack	Williamsburg, New York	United States	For Harbeck & Co.
15 May	Hotspur	East Indiaman	Messrs. T. & W. Smith	Newcastle upon Tyne	United Kingdom	For Messrs. Hawks & Crawshay.
16 May	Frankfort	Steamship	Messrs. John Reid & Co.	Port Glasgow	United Kingdom	For Messrs. Vianna, Jones & Co.
17 May	Marchioness of Londonderry	Passenger ship	Oliver	Howdon	United Kingdom	For Messrs. Marshall & Eldridge.
17 May	Orinoco	Steamship	Pitcher	Northfleet	United Kingdom	For Royal Mail Steam Packet Company.
17 May	Pet	Brig	Messrs. H. & G. Barrick	Whitby	United Kingdom	For Messrs. William Chapman, Riley, & Co.
24 May	Challenge	Clipper	W. H. Webb	New York	United States	For N. L. & G. Griswold.
29 May	Lioness	Steamship		South Shields	United Kingdom	For private owner.
31 May	Jhelum	Steamship		Bombay	India	For British East India Company.
31 May	The John Taylor	Merchantman	Messrs. James and William Hall	Aberdeen	United Kingdom	For private owners.
May	Asia	Barque	G. H. Parke	Quebec	(United Kingdom of Great Britain and Ireland) Province of Canada	For private owner.
May	Elizabeth Duncan	Barque		Dundee	United Kingdom	For private owner.
May	Jane Pratt	Merchantman	Clarke	Jersey	Jersey	For Messrs. J. J. Mellhuish & Co.
May	Kate Evelyn	Barque	George Short	Claxheugh	United Kingdom	For G. Avery.
May	Santiago	Paddle steamer	Robert Napier and Sons	Govan	United Kingdom	For Pacific Steam Navigation Company.
May	Taff	Merchantman		Cardiff	United Kingdom	For private owner.
May	Telegraph	Extreme clipper	J. O. Curtis	Medford, Massachusetts	United States	For P. & S. Sprague & Co.
2 June	Anna Dixon	Merchantman	W. & J Pile, or W. Pile Jr.	Sunderland	United Kingdom	For R. Kirby.
2 June	Brisk	Sloop-of-war		Woolwich Dockyard	United Kingdom	For Royal Navy.
2 June	Derwent	Yacht	William Camper	Gosport	United Kingdom	For Lord Londesborough.
2 June	Lavrack	Cutter yacht	White	Cowes	United Kingdom	For Mr. Williams.
3 June	Heather Bell	Brig	Messrs. Walter Hood & Col.	Aberdeen	United Kingdom	For private owner.
12 June	Samuel S. Lewis	Steamship	Birely & Sons	Philadelphia, Pennsylvania	United States	For Messrs. Harnden & Co.
14 June	Chebucto	Full-rigged ship	Messrs. Bilbe & Perry	Rotherhithe	United Kingdom	For Anderson, Thompson & Co.
14 June	Christian Bergh	Pilot boat	Westervelt & Co.	New York	United States	For New York Pilots.
14 June	City of Manchester	Ocean liner	Tod and MacGregor	Partick	United Kingdom	For Inman Line.
16 June	Nightingale	Extreme clipper	Samuel Hanscomb Jr.	Portsmouth, New Hampshire	United States	For A.F. Miller.
16 June	Vimiera	Full-rigged ship	James Laing	Sunderland	United Kingdom	For Duncan Dunbar & Sons.
17 June	Staffordshire	Clipper	Donald McKay	East Boston, Massachusetts	United States	For Enoch Train & Co.
20 June	Hornet	Extreme clipper	Westervelt & McKay	New York	United States	For Chamberlain & Phelps.
21 June	City of Pittsburgh	Steamship		Williamsburg, New York	United States	For C. Statesbreng.
25 June	Seaman's Bride	Extreme clipper	R. & E. Bell	Baltimore, Maryland	United States	For Thomas J. Handy.
28 June	Amazon	Paddle steamer	R. & H. Green	Blackwall Yard	United Kingdom	For Royal Mail Steam Packet Company.
28 June	Danube	Steamship		River Thames	United Kingdom	For Imperial Russian Navy.
28 June	Omega	Yacht	Gutteridge	Selby	United Kingdom	For Mr. Gutteridge.
June	Duchess of Sutherland	Merchantman	H. Carr	Hylton	United Kingdom	For Thomas Young.
June	H. C. Kidston	Barque		New Glasgow	(United Kingdom of Great Britain and Ireland) Unknown	For private owner.
June	Phantasie	Schooner	Marshall	Ringsend	United Kingdom	For private owner.
1 July	Janus	Steamship	John Laird	Birkenhead	United Kingdom	For Imperial Russian Government.
1 July	Kasseid Heir	Steam yacht	Messrs. Joyce & Co.	Isle of Dogs	United Kingdom	For Pacha of Egypt.
1 July	Raven	Extreme clipper	James M. Hood	Somerset, Maine	United States	For Crocker & Sturgis.
2 July	New Orleans	Barque	Messrs. A. McMillan & Son	Dumbarton	United Kingdom	For Messrs. Andrew Stewart & Co.
2 July	The Wanderer	Yacht	Thomas Williams	Caernarfon	United Kingdom	For Humphrey Owen.
3 July	Glaucus	Brig	Messrs. Robert Steele & Co	Dumbarton	United Kingdom	For Messrs. J. & N. Stewart.
9 July	Paou Shun	Steamship	Gray	Newhaven	United Kingdom	For private owner.
10 July	Comet	Extreme clipper	William H. Webb	New York	United States	For Bucklin & Crane.
12 July	Golden Gate	Extreme clipper	Jacob A. Westervelt	New York	United States	For Chambers & Heiser.
12 July	Magdalena	Steamship	Pitcher	Northfleet	United Kingdom	For Royal Mail Steam Packet Company.
15 July	Parana	Steamship	Messrs. Wigram & Sons	Northam	United Kingdom	For Royal Mail Steam Packet Company.
15 July	Snow Squall	Clipper	Cornelius Butler	Cape Elizabeth, Maine	United States	For Charles R. Green.
29 July	Affghan	East Indiaman	Messrs. L. Kennedy & Co.	Whitehaven	United Kingdom	For N. Boadle.
29 July	Dan Glaister	Schooner	Messrs. H. Wood & Sons	Liverpool	United Kingdom	For private owner.
31 July	Isis	Frigate		Brest	France	For French Navy.
31 July	R. B. Forbes	Clipper	Samuel Hall	East Boston, Massachusetts	United States	For J. S. Coolidge & Co.
31 July	Shandon	Clipper	Robert Napier and Sons	Govan	United Kingdom	For private owner.
31 July	Tubal Cain	Full-rigged ship	Messrs. Jordan & Getty	Liverpool	United Kingdom	For Messrs. L. H. Macintyre & Co.
31 July	Vixen	Schooner	H. Grave	Peel	Isle of Man	For private owner.
31 July	Wild Pigeon	Extreme clipper	George Raynes	Portsmouth, New Hamphire	United States	For Olyphant & Co.
July	Anchor	Hoy		Portsmouth Dockyard	United Kingdom	For Royal Navy.
July	Glasgow	Full-rigged ship		Quebec	(United Kingdom of Great Britain and Ireland) Province of Canada	For private owner.
July	Glencoe	Merchantman	Ralph Hutchinson	Sunderland	United Kingdom	For Mr. Davison.
July	Island Home	Barque	Buchanan & Gibson	Sunderland	United Kingdom	For John Martin.
July	Jubilee	Snow	Bradley & Potts	Hylton	United Kingdom	For Mr. Haddock.
July	Marion	Snow	Thomas Robson	Claxheugh	United Kingdom	For J. Wright.
July	Star	Merchantman	John Crown	Southwick	United Kingdom	For J. Crown.
July	William McGowan	Merchantman	William Carr	Hylton	United Kingdom	For Martin & Co.
July	Zuma	Snow	William Carr	Hylton	United Kingdom	For W. Frost.
1 August	City of Manchester	Merchantman	Messrs. Denny & Rankin	Dumbarton	United Kingdom	For Messrs. Jacot, Taylor and Teper.
2 August	Phœbe	Steamship	Messrs. Alexander Denny & Brother	Dumbarton	United Kingdom	For private owner.
6 August	Invincible	Clipper	William H. Webb	New York	United States	For James W, Phillips.
7 August	Henry Clay	Paddle steamer	Thomas Collyer	New York	United States	For Thomas Collyer, William Radford & John Tallman.
9 August	Coringa	Clipper	Jotham Stetson	Medford, Massachusetts	United States	For N. B. Goddard & Co.
12 August	Trade Wind	Extreme clipper	Jacob Bell	New York	United States	For Booth & Edgar and William Platt & Sons.
13 August	Highflyer	Highflyer-class frigate	C. J. Mare & Co.	Leamouth	United Kingdom	For Royal Navy.
13 August	Metropolitan	Steamship	Robert Napier and Sons	Govan	United Kingdom	For private owner.
14 August	Glasgow	Steamship	Messrs. Tod & McGregor	Kelvinside	United Kingdom	For private owner.
16 August	Times	Steamship	Messrs. Smith & Rodger	Glasgow	United Kingdom	For private owner.
23 August	Correo	Steamship	Brown	Dundee	United Kingdom	For William Clark.
25 August	Amazonas	Paddle frigate	Thomas Wilson, Sons, & Co.	Birkenhead	United Kingdom	For Imperial Brazilian Navy.
26 August	Norma	Clipper	John Pile	Sunderland, County Durham	United Kingdom	For Messrs. Pryde & Jones.
28 August	Alpha	Sloop	John Noble	Liverpool	United Kingdom	For Messrs. S. and L. Lloyd.
28 August	Thomas Hamlin	Steamship	Messrs. Coutts & Parkinson	Newcastle upon Tyne	United Kingdom	For Thomas Hamlin.
30 August	Dunrobin Castle	Full-rigged ship	Messrs. Hall	Footdee	United Kingdom	For Messrs. Donaldson, Rose & Co.
30 August	Georgiana	Full-rigged ship		Quebec	(United Kingdom of Great Britain and Ireland) Province of Canada	For private owner.
31 August	Nil Desperandum	Barque	Rowe	Wapping	United Kingdom	For private owner.
August	Ambassador	Barque	Hodgson & Gardiner	Sunderland	United Kingdom	For J. Moore.
August	Coral Isle	Barque		Miramichi	(United Kingdom of Great Britain and Ireland) Colony of New Brunswick	For private owner.
August	John Rutledge	Full-rigged ship	J. J. Abrahams	Baltimore, Maryland	United States	For William Ravenel.
August	Rubicon	Barque	Lawson Gales	Sunderland	United Kingdom	For George Thompson & associates.
August	Shackamaxon	Packet ship	John K. Hammit	Kensington, Philadelphia	United States	For George M'Henry & Co.
August	Tongataboo	Barque			(United Kingdom of Great Britain and Ireland) Colony of Nova Scotia	For private owner.
1 September	Casimir	Steamship		Warsaw	Kingdom of Poland	For Warsaw Steam Navigation Company.
10 September	South Carolina	Steamship	Jabez Williams and Co.	New York	United States	For private owner.
11 September	Kate and Emily	Ketch	Messrs. Lucas Bros.	Lowestoft	United Kingdom	For private owner.
11 September	Oceanica	Barque	Messrs. Charles Connell & Son	Belfast	United Kingdom	For J. Lemon.
11 September	Victory	Steamship	Jackson	Middlesbrough	United Kingdom	For John Strong Sr.
13 September	Chenaub	Steamship		Bombay	India	For British East India Company.
13 September	Sea Nymph	Steamship	Messrs. Furley	Gainsborough	United Kingdom	For private owner.
17 September	Staffordshire	Packet ship		Liverpool	United Kingdom	For Messrs. Train & Co.
20 September	Sword Fish	Extreme clipper	William H. Webb	New York	United States	For Barclay & Livingston.
25 September	Northern Light	Extreme clipper	E. & H.O. Briggs	South Boston, Massachusetts	United States	For James Huckins.
26 September	Brazil	Paddle frigate	Wilson	Birkenhead	United Kingdom	For Imperial Brazilian Navy.
27 September	Demerara	Paddle steamer	Messrs. Patterson	Bristol	United Kingdom	For Royal West India Mail Steam Packet Company.
29 September	Tiber	Steamship	Messrs. John Reid & Co.	Port Glasgow	United Kingdom	For Messrs. John Bibby & Sons.
September	Dumfriesshire	Barque	John Smith	Sunderland	United Kingdom	For John Martin.
September	Flying Fish	Extreme clipper	Donald McKay	East Boston, Massachusetts	United States	For Sampson & Tappan.
10 October	Constantine	Corvette		Rochefort	France	For French Navy.
11 October	Dalemain	Barque	Robert Ritson & Co.	Maryport	United Kingdom	For David Laidman.
21 October	Stilwell S. Bishop	Clipper	William Cramp	Kensington, Pennsylvania	United States	For Henry Simon Jr.
22 October	May Fly	Schooner	J. White	Cowes	United Kingdom	For Hyde Parker.
23 October	Bordeaux	Steamship	Messrs. John Reid & Co.	Port Glasgow	United Kingdom	For Van Hoey Smith.
25 October	Chusan	Steamship	Messrs. Millar, Ravenhill & Co.	Low Walker	United Kingdom	For Peninsular and Oriental Steam Navigation Company.
25 October	Hurricane	Extreme clipper	Isaac C. Smith	Hoboken, New Jersey	United States	For C. W. & H. Thomas.
October	Clarence	Steamship	Laird	Birkenhead	United Kingdom	For private owner.
October	Fleetwood	Barque		Miramichi	(United Kingdom of Great Britain and Ireland) Colony of New Brunswick	For private owner.
October	Jenny Jones	Smack	Chidlaw Roberts	Dolgelley	United Kingdom	For Robert Jones.
October	Princeton	Steamship		Boston Navy Yard	United States	For United States Navy.
October	Rurik	Frigate	Gamla Warfsbolaget	Åbo	(Russian Empire) Grand Duchy of Finland	For Imperial Russian Navy.
3 November	Fearless	Steamship	Messrs. Lunell & Co.	Bristol	United Kingdom	For private owner.
5 November	Pandora	Smack	Messrs. Brown	Montrose	United Kingdom	For private owner.
10 November	Clyde	Steamship	Messrs. Smith & Rodger	Govan	United Kingdom	For Carron Company.
13 November	Bonita	Schooner	Mansfield	Teignmouth	United Kingdom	For T. R. Matthews.
14 November	Enchantress	Pilot boat	Westervelt & McKay	New York	United States	For John Maginn.
22 November	Governor Morton	Medium Clipper	James M. Hood	Somerset, Massachusetts	United States	For Everett & Brown.
22 November	Naragana	Full-rigged ship	Barkas	Sunderland	United Kingdom	For John Dobson and David Cowan.
24 November	Cambalie	Chinaman	C. Lamport	Workington	United Kingdom	For John Aikin.
24 November	Sea Horse	East Indiaman	Messrs. Peile, Scott & Co.	Workington	United Kingdom	For Messrs. Potter & Co.
24 November	Wild Flower	Full-rigged ship	Messrs. Rennie, Johnstone & Co.	Liverpool	United Kingdom	For Mr. Anderson.
26 November	City of Kandy	Barque	James Laing	Sunderland	United Kingdom	For Cowie & Co.
26 November	Isabella Kerr	West Indiaman	Messrs. A. M'Millan & Son	Dumbarton	United Kingdom	For John Kerr.
November	Antelope	Medium clipper	James O. Curtis	Medford, Massachusetts	United States	For William Lincoln and Co., Boston.
November	Bella	Merchantman		Liverpool	United Kingdom	For Messrs. Vining & Co.
November	Danzig	Paddle corvette	J. W. Klawitter	Danzig	Prussia	For Prussian Navy.
November	Excelsior	Snow	Booth & Blacklock	Sunderland	United Kingdom	For J. Longton.
November	Fettercairn	Steamship	Messrs. Calman & Martin	Dundee	United Kingdom	For George A. Patullo.
November	Spitzbergen	Whaler	John Duncan	Speymouth	United Kingdom	For private owner.
November	Spring	Collier	Thomas Hobkirk	Whitby	United Kingdom	For Gideon Smales.
4 December	Judith	Merchantman	Austin & Mills	Sunderland	United Kingdom	For Greig & Co.
6 December	Englishman	Full-rigged ship	Messrs. Wigram's	Northam	United Kingdom	For private owner.
6 December	Hampshire	Full-rigged ship	Messrs. Wigram's	Northam	United Kingdom	For private owner.
10 December	Cambrian	Barque	Messrs. White	Cowes	United Kingdom	For private owner.
20 December	Golconda	Full-rigged ship	Messrs. R. Thompson & Sons	Monkwearmouth	United Kingdom	For Messrs. Blair, Sparks & Ogden.
23 December	Challenger	Full-rigged ship	Messrs. Green	Blackwall	United Kingdom	For private owner.
23 December	Faid Gihaad	Steamship	Messrs. Mare & Co.	Blackwall	United Kingdom	For Egyptian Navy.
23 December	Lady Jocelyn	Steamship	Messrs. Mare & Co.	Blackwall	United Kingdom	For General Screw Steam Shipping Company.
24 December	Arabia	Paddle steamer	Messrs. Steel & Co.	Greenock	United Kingdom	For Cunard Line.
24 December	Governor Wynyard	Paddle steamer	Stone & Lanford	Freemans Bay	(United Kingdom of Great Britain and Ireland) New Zealand	For C. J. Stone, F. Gardiner and A. Cook.
Spring	Sarah Mary	Full-rigged ship	W. G. Russell	Quebec	(United Kingdom of Great Britain and Ireland) Province of Canada	For private owner.
Unknown date	Abrota	Barque	Buchanan & Gibson	Sunderland	United Kingdom	For Briard & Co.
Unknown date	Agra	Merchantman		Sunderland	United Kingdom	For J. Shepherd.
Unknown date	Akbar	Full-rigged ship	J. Crown	Sunderland	United Kingdom	For Mr. Luscombe.
Unknown date	Ann Eliza	Merchantman	Hodgson & Garner	Sunderland	United Kingdom	For Robert Sleightholm.
Unknown date	Anne Longton	Full-rigged ship	J. & J. Robinson	Sunderland	United Kingdom	For Mr. Currie.
Unknown date	Antelope	Clipper	J. O. Curtis	Medford, Massachusetts	United States	For William Lincoln & Co.
Unknown date	Aramingo	Clipper	Aaron Westervelt	New York	United States	For Chamberlain & Phelps.
Unknown date	Ashmore	Barque	George Barker	Sunderland	United Kingdom	For Alcock & Co.
Unknown date	Barbaras	Snow	E. Brown	Sunderland	United Kingdom	For T. Coltman.
Unknown date	Bartley	Snow	Robert Thompson & Sons	Sunderland	United Kingdom	For Light & Co.
Unknown date	Beejapore	Full-rigged ship		Saint John	(United Kingdom of Great Britain and Ireland) Colony of New Brunswick	For Willis & Company.
Unknown date	Bosphorus	Barque	Joseph Simpson	Sunderland	United Kingdom	For Newton & Co.
Unknown date	Bride	Barque	W. Briggs	Sunderland	United Kingdom	For Carter & Co.
Unknown date	Britannia	Barque	Booth & Blacklock	Sunderland	United Kingdom	For J. Twizell.
Unknown date	Calhoun	Paddle steamer		New York	United States	For private owner.
Unknown date	Calumet	Snow	Bartram & Lister	Sunderland	United Kingdom	For T. Booth.
Unknown date	Canopus	Barque		Sunderland	United Kingdom	For Crosby & Co.
Unknown date	Caucasian	Barque		Sunderland	United Kingdom	For Mr. Rounthwaite.
Unknown date	Chalmers	Merchantman	James Laing	Sunderland	United Kingdom	For J. Laing.
Unknown date	Chandenagore	Barque	W. H. Pearson	Sunderland	United Kingdom	For John Hay.
Unknown date	Charles Mallory	Clipper	Charles Mallory	Mystic, Connecticut	United States	For Charles Mallory.
Unknown date	Chieftain	Snow		Sunderland	United Kingdom	For Mr. Wilkinson.
Unknown date	Cistus	Snow	Alcock	Sunderland	United Kingdom	For J. Alcock.
Unknown date	Corra Linn	Schooner	Booth & Blacklock	Sunderland	United Kingdom	For Child & Co.
Unknown date	Countless	Merchantman	Robert Thompson & Sons	Sunderland	United Kingdom	For T. Green.
Unknown date	Courser	Medium clipper	Paul Curtis	Medford, Massachusetts	United States	For Richardson & Company.
Unknown date	Cruiser	Merchantman	George Barker	Sunderland	United Kingdom	For Porrett & Co.
Unknown date	Czarina	Snow		Sunderland	United Kingdom	For W. Petrie.
Unknown date	Daniel Webster	Pilot boat		Chelsea, Massachusetts	United States	For William R. Lampee.
Unknown date	Defiance	Barque	Short	Sunderland	United Kingdom	For A. Strong.
Unknown dte	Desidera	Frigate			Norway	For Royal Norwegian Navy.
Unknown date	Dominion	Barque	Halls	Sunderland	United Kingdom	For Mr. Temperley.
Unknown date	Duke of Northumberland	Merchantman	William Doxford & W. Crown	Sunderland	United Kingdom	For private owner.
Unknown date	E. C. Scranton	Full-rigged ship		Mystic, Connecticut	United States	For private owner.
Unknown date	Eleanor	Barque		Sunderland	United Kingdom	For Mr. Charleton.
Unknown date	Eliza Charles	Barque	W. Naisby	Sunderland	United Kingdom	For Roberts & Co.
Unknown date	Eliza F. Mason	Clipper		Baltimore, Maryland	United States	For private owner.
Unknown date	Eliza Thornton	Barque	Sykes & Co	Sunderland	United Kingdom	For private owner.
Unknown date	Emperor	Schooner	John Anderton	Runcorn	United Kingdom	For John Anderton.
Unknown date	Eos	Barque		Sunderland	United Kingdom	For T. Alcock.
Unknown date	Everton	Brig	R. Williamson	Harrington	United Kingdom	For private owner.
Unknown date	Flying Cloud	Extreme clipper	Donald McKay	East Boston, Massachusetts	United States	For Enoch Train.
Unknown date	Florist	Merchantman		River Wear	United Kingdom	For private owner.
Unknown date	Georgiana	Snow	Lawson Gales	South Hylton	United Kingdom	For L. Gales.
Unknown date	Golden Gate	Paddle steamer	William H. Webb	New York	United States	For Pacific Mail Steamship Company.
Unknown date	Gower	Schooner	William Bayley	Ipswich	United Kingdom	For private owner.
Unknown date	Great Western	Clipper		New York	United States	For private owner.
Unknown date	Hannah Maria	Merchantman	George Barker	Sunderland	United Kingdom	For J. Michael.
Unknown date	Harlington	Snow	Booth & Blacklock	Sunderland	United Kingdom	For Penman & Co.
Unknown date	Harriet Hoxie	Clipper	Irons & Grinnell	Mystic, Connecticut	United States	For Post, Smith & Co.
Unknown date	Hexham	Snow	W. Chilton	Sunderland	United Kingdom	For Crowe & Co.
Unknown date	Honour	Snow	G. W. & W. J. Hall	Sunderland	United Kingdom	For R. Brough.
Unknown date	Hooghly	Medium clipper	Samuel Hall	East Boston, Massachusetts	United States	For D. C. Bacon & Sons.
Unknown date	Hoosier	Paddle steamer	John Kruse	Willamette Falls	(United States) Oregon Territory	For John Zumwalt.
Unknown date	Ithiel	Snow	Edward Brown	Sunderland	United Kingdom	For James Hay.
Unknown date	James Adger	Paddle steamer	William H. Webb	New York	United States	For James Adger & Co.
Unknown date	Jane & Elizabeth	Merchantman	Robert Thompson & Sons	Sunderland	United Kingdom	For Swan & Co.
Unknown date	Jane Cockerill	Barque	T. Stonehouse	Sunderland	United Kingdom	For John Cockerill.
Unknown date	Jane Spoors	Brig	George Barker	Sunderland	United Kingdom	For Spoors & Co.
Unknown date	John and Alice Brown	Merchantman	Todd & Brown	Sunderland	United Kingdom	For A. Brown & associates.
Unknown date	John Muers	Merchantman		Sunderland	United Kingdom	For W. Brown.
Unknown date	John Stuart	Medium clipper	Perrine, Patterson & Stack	New York	United States	For B. A. Mumford, James Smith and others.
Unknown date	John Wade	Clipper	Hayden & Cudworth	Medford, Massachusetts	United States	For Reed & Wade.
Unknown date	Lady	Merchantman		River Tees	United Kingdom	For Walter Mitchell.
Unknown date	Lady Elgin	Paddle steamer	Bidwell & Banta	Buffalo, New York	United States	For Gurdon Saltonstall Hubbard.
Unknown date	Lady Zetland	Schooner	Peverley & Co	Sunderland	United Kingdom	For G. Foster.
Unknown date	Lafayette	Steamship	Messrs. Perrine, Patterson & Stack	Williamsburgh, New York	United States	For J. G. Williams and others.
Unknown date	Landscape	Snow	John Bergen	Amble	United Kingdom	For private owner.
Unknown date	Lord Clarendon	Full-rigged ship	William Nesbitt	North Sydney	(United Kingdom of Great Britain and Ireland) Colony of Nova Scotia	For private owner.
Unknown date	Lotus	Merchantman	George Clark	Monkwearmouth	United Kingdom	For private owner.
Unknown date	Mahmudie	Ship of the line		Constantinople	Ottoman Empire	For Ottoman Navy.
Unknown date	Maitland	Merchantman		Sunderland	United Kingdom	For J. Kelso.
Unknown date	Maple Leaf	Paddle steamer	Marine Railway Yard	Kingston	(United Kingdom of Great Britain and Ireland) Upper Canada	For private owner.
Unknown date	Marchioness	Brigantine		Waterford	United Kingdom	For private owner.
Unknown date	Marco Polo	Full-rigged ship	James Smith	Saint John	(United Kingdom of Great Britain and Ireland) Colony of New Brunswick	For James Smith.
Unknown date	Mary Ann	Barque	W. Potts	Sunderland	United Kingdom	For Potts Bros.
Unknown date	Mary Hall	Barque		Sunderland	United Kingdom	For J. C. Hall.
Unknown date	Mary Ridley	Barque	Edward Bailey	Pallion	United Kingdom	For Carr & Co.
Unknown date	Matanzas	Barque		Sunderland	United Kingdom	For Mr. Thompson.
Unknown date	Mechanical Whale	Submarine		New York	United States	For Submarine Exploring Company.
Unknown date	Meggy	Snow	Ratcliffe & Co.	Sunderland	United Kingdom	For Mr. Elsdon.
Unknown date	Meredith	schooner			United States	For United States Coast Survey.
Unknown date	Mexico	Paddle steamer		New York	United States	For private owner.
Unknown date	Monsoon	Clipper	Trufant & Drummond	Bath, Maine	United States	For George Hussey.
Unknown date	Multnomah	Paddle steamer		Canemah or Oregon City	(United States) Oregon Territory	For Bissell, Maxwell & Gray.
Unknown date	Musquito	Helena-class brig-sloop		Pembroke Dockyard	United Kingdom	For Royal Navy.
Unknown date	Nightingale	Tea clipper	Samuel Hanscomb Jr.	Eliot, Maine	United States	For Davis & Co.
Unknown date	Nidaros	Corvette			Norway	For Royal Norwegian Navy.
Unknown date	Norna	Full-rigged ship	W. J. Bennett	Sunderland	United Kingdom	For Pryde & Co.
Unknown date	Ocean	Snow	W. H. Pearson	Sunderland	United Kingdom	For Cooper & Co.
Unknowndate	Orion	Brig		Härnösand	Sweden	For private owner.
Unknown date	Osbert	Merchantman	James Laing	Sunderland	United Kingdom	For Mr. Dalrymple.
Unknown date	Ottoway	Merchantman	Messrs. Denny & Rankin	Dumbarton	United Kingdom	For private owner.
Unknown date	Peace	Merchantman	J. Candlish	Sunderland	United Kingdom	For Candlish & Co.
Unknown date	Peiki-Messeret	Ship of the line		Constantinople	Ottoman Empire	For Ottoman Navy.
Unknown date	Pet	Merchantman	J. Hardie	Sunderland	United Kingdom	For Mr. Marwood.
Unknown date	Pleiades	Yacht		Gosport	United Kingdom	For private owner.
Unknown date	Prince Woronzoff	Snow	Robert Thompson & Sons	Sunderland	United Kingdom	For Swire & Co.
Unknown date	Punch	Merchantman	Robert Thompson & Sons	Sunderland	United Kingdom	For Ogle & Douglas.
Unknown date	Pyrenees	Full-rigged ship	James Laing	Sunderland	United Kingdom	For Duncan Dunbar.
Unknown date	Radetzky	Steamship		Óbuda	Kingdom of Hungary	For private owner.
Unknown date	Rainbow	Snow	Lightfoot	Sunderland	United Kingdom	For Thomas Speeding.
Unknown date	Refuge	Merchantman	William Doxford & W. Crown	Sunderland	United Kingdom	For W. Doxford.
Unknown date	Regina	Merchantman	W. Reed	Sunderland	United Kingdom	For Mr. Richardson.
Unknown date	Rehoboth	Merchantman		Sunderland	United Kingdom	For Mr. Outterside.
Unknown date	Residue	Merchantman	Robert Thompson & Sons	Sunderland	United Kingdom	For W. Adamson.
Unknown date	Robert Barbour	Full-rigged ship		Maryport	United Kingdom	For private owner.
Unknown date	Rob Roy	East Indiaman	Messrs. Denny & Rankin	Dumbarton	United Kingdom	For private owner.
Unknown date	Rodsley	Full-rigged ship	Robert Thompson & Sons	Sunderland	United Kingdom	For E. Graham.
Unknown date	Roebuck	Clipper	Bourne & Kingsbury	Kennebunk, Maine	United States	For Thaddeus Nichols and Thomas Curtis.
Unknown date	Royal Charlie	Barque	R. & W. Hutchinson	Sunderland	United Kingdom	For Mr. Hutchinson.
Unknown date	Sabrina	Brigantine		Bathurst	(United Kingdom of Great Britain and Ireland) Colony of New Brunswick	For private owner.
Unknown date	Saint George	Barque	Sykes & Co.	Sunderland	United Kingdom	For Briggs & Co.
Unknown date	Sarah Margaret	Merchantman	Arrow Leithead	Sunderland	United Kingdom	For J. Wright.
Unknown date	Security	Barque	Ralph Hutchinson, or R. & W. Hutchinson	Sunderland	United Kingdom	For private owner.
Unknown date	Shakespeare	Full-rigged ship	John Smith	Sunderland	United Kingdom	For Kendall & Co.
Unknown date	Shied-Sade	Frigate		Constantinople	Ottoman Empire	For Ottoman Navy.
Unknown date	Sir Henry Bulwer	Sternwheeler		Greytown	Nicaragua	For private owner.
Unknown date	Sir Robert	Schooner	Brundrit & Whiteway	Runcorn	United Kingdom	For Brundrit & Whiteway.
Unknown date	Snowdrop	Schooner	William R. Abbay	Sunderland	United Kingdom	For Mr. Adamson.
Unknown date	Snow Squall	Extreme clipper	Alfred Butler	Cape Elizabeth, Maine	United States	For Charles R. Green.
Unknown date	Stamboul	Barque	R. H. Potts & Bros.	Sunderland	United Kingdom	For Messrs. Dryden.
Unknown date	State of Georgia	Paddle steamer	Vaughan & Lynn	Philadelphia, Pennsylvania	United States	For private owner.
Unknown date	Swordfish	Clipper	William H. Webb	New York	United States	For Barclays & Livingston.
Unknown date	Tourist	Steamship	Tod & McGregor	Partick	United Kingdom	For private owner.
Unknown date	Trio	Brigantine		Sunderland	United Kingdom	For Herring & Co.
Unknown date	Typhoon	Clipper		New York	United States	For private owner.
Unknown date	Union	Clipper		Baltimore, Maryland	United States	For S. Lurman & Co.
Unknown date	Valkyrion	Man of war			Sweden	For Royal Swedish Navy.
Unknown date	Venice	Snow	M. Stothard	Sunderland	United Kingdom	For Mr. Collingwood.
Unknown date	Victory	Clipper		Newburyport, Massachusetts	United States	For Benjamin A. Gould and others.
Unknown date	Wacousta	Full-rigged ship			(United Kingdom of Great Britain and Ireland) Colony of New Brunswick	For private owner.
Unknown date	Warata	Steamship		Greenock	United Kingdom	For private owner.
Unknown date	Water Witch	Paddle gunboat		Washington Navy Yard	United States	For United States Navy.
Unknown date	Worthy	Brig		Sunderland	United Kingdom	For Mr. Marriott.
Unknown date	Yarra Yarra	Steamship		Greenock	United Kingdom	For private owner.
