= Shooting Star (ship) =

Shooting Star may refer to the ships:

- Shooting Star 1851, an extreme clipper built by James O. Curtis of 903 tons Old Measurement
- Ino 1851, a clipper built by Perrine, Patterson & Stack, acquired by the U.S. Navy and commissioned USS Ino that was renamed Shooting Star in 1867
- MS Shooting Star 1940, C2 motor ship, USMC hull #22, built by Tampa Shipbuilding Company, Tampa, Florida that was commissioned USS Lassen (AE-3)
- MS Shooting Star 1942, C2-SU-R motor ship, USMC hull #117, built by Sun Shipbuilding & Drydock Company, Chester, Pennsylvania as a refrigerated cargo vessel. The ship was withdrawn from the James River reserve fleet and bareboat chartered to the U.S. Army during the West Coast maritime strike of 1948 (See MARAD vessel status cards).
