= List of shipwrecks in August 1858 =

The list of shipwrecks in August 1858 includes ships sunk, foundered, wrecked, grounded, or otherwise lost during August 1858.

== 1 August ==
List of shipwrecks: 1 August 1858
Ship	State	Description
Retrenchment	(United Kingdom of Great Britain and Ireland) Jamaica	The sloop was wrecked at Port Morant with the loss of eleven of the twelve people on board. She was on a voyage from Marichoneal Bay to Kingston.

== 2 August ==
List of shipwrecks: 2 August 1858
Ship	State	Description
Fly	United Kingdom	The Mersey Flat sank in Liverpool Bay.
Lady Jocelyn	United Kingdom	The ship ran aground on the Holme Sand, in the North Sea off the coast of Suffolk. She was on a voyage from London to Sunderland, County Durham. She was refloated and taken in to Lowestoft, Suffolk.
Mary Seaton	United Kingdom	The barque was wrecked on a reef 15 to 20 nautical miles (28 to 37 km) south of "Kalagouk", Burma. She wason a voyage from Moulmein, Burma to London.

== 3 August ==
List of shipwrecks: 3 August 1858
Ship	State	Description
Mayflower	United States	The barque capsized in the Atlantic Ocean with the loss of fifteen of the 23 people on board. Survivors were rescued by Cairo (Flag unknown) was on a voyage from New Orleans, Louisiana to Nantes, Loire-Inférieure, France.
Temperance Star	United Kingdom	The brig ran aground on the Hvide Adde, Bornholm, Denmark. She was on a voyage from Newcastle upon Tyne, Northumberland to Riga, Russia.

== 5 August ==
List of shipwrecks: 5 August 1858
Ship	State	Description
Eliza Pike	United States	The ship ran aground and sank at Seal Island, Nova Scotia, British North America.

== 6 August ==
List of shipwrecks: 6 August 1858
Ship	State	Description
Antelope	United States	The clipper struck Discovery Shoal, off the Paracel Islands and was wrecked. All on board survived.
Magistrate	United Kingdom	The barque was abandoned in the Atlantic Ocean. Her crew were rescued. She was on a voyage from New Orleans, Louisiana, United States to Liverpool, Lancashire.

== 7 August ==
List of shipwrecks: 7 August 1858
Ship	State	Description
Burrels	United Kingdom	The brigantine was wrecked at Carthagena, Granadine Confederation. Her crew were rescued.
Concordia	United Kingdom	The barque sprang a leak and sank in the Mediterranean Sea (38°33′N 06°00′E). Her crew were rescued by the brig Fourteen (United Kingdom). Concordia was on a voyage from Agrigento, Sicily to Newcastle upon Tyne, Northumberland.
Virginia	United States	The steamship exploded and sank at New Orleans, Louisiana.

== 8 August ==
List of shipwrecks: 8 August 1858
Ship	State	Description
Cadzandria	Netherlands	The full-rigged ship was driven ashore and wrecked at Nagasaki, Japan with the loss of a crew member. She was on a voyage from Batavia, Netherlands East Indies to Nagasaki.
L'Eclair	France	The steamship ran aground at Cherbourg, Manche. She was refloated.
Peter Folkes	United Kingdom	The ship was abandoned in the Mediterranean Sea and was presumed to have foundered. Her crew were rescued by the steamship Simois (France). Peter Folkes was on a voyage from Galaţi, Ottoman Empire to Falmouth, Cornwall.

== 9 August ==
List of shipwrecks: 9 August 1858
Ship	State	Description
Jura	United Kingdom	The steamship ran aground on the Pluckington Bank, in the Irish Sea off the coast of Lancashire. She was on a voyage from New York to Liverpool, Lancashire. She was refloated.

== 10 August ==
List of shipwrecks: 10 August 1858
Ship	State	Description
Columbus	United States	The bark was wrecked in Tugur Bay in the western Sea of Okhotsk.

== 11 August ==
List of shipwrecks: 11 August 1858
Ship	State	Description
Premier	(United Kingdom of Great Britain and Ireland) British North America	The schooner foundered off Point Abino, Province of Canada. She was on a voyage from Chatham, Kent to Quebec City, Province of Canada.
Sonbadar	India	The ship was wrecked on "Foureil Island, in the Shadian Group" with the loss of 40 lives. She was on a voyage from Mauritius to Madras.
Wilberforce	United Kingdom	The ship ran aground on the Haisborough Sands, in the North Sea off the coast of Norfolk. She was on a voyage from "Wyborg" to Newhaven, Sussex. She was refloated and resumed her voyage, but ran aground off Pakefield, Suffolk. She was refloated and taken in to Lowestoft, Suffolk in a leaky condition.

== 12 August ==
List of shipwrecks: 12 August 1858
Ship	State	Description
Alliance	United Kingdom	The ship ran aground on the Arklow Bank, in the Irish Sea off the coast of County Wicklow. She was on a voyage from Liverpool, Lancashire to Sydney, New South Wales. She was refloated and put back to Liverpool.

== 13 August ==
List of shipwrecks: 13 August 1858
Ship	State	Description
Pyreole	France	The steamship ran aground off Saint-Nazaire, Ille-et-Vilaine. Her crew were rescued.
Robert and George	United Kingdom	The brig was abandoned in the Atlantic Ocean. Her crew were rescued. She was on a voyage from South Shields, County Durham to Venice, Kingdom of Lombardy–Venetia.

== 14 August ==
List of shipwrecks: 14 August 1858
Ship	State	Description
Abby Langdon	United States	The ship was driven ashore and wrecked in Compton Bay, Isle of Wight, United Kingdom. She was on a voyage from Akyab, Burma to Antwerp, Belgium.
Amazon	United Kingdom	The ship ran aground in the Bassein River and was severely damaged. She was on a voyage from Bassein, Burma to London. She was beached, and was consequently declared a total loss.
RMS Europa	United Kingdom	The steamship was in collision with SS Arabia (United Kingdom) off Cape Race, Newfoundland, British North America and was severely damaged. She was on a voyage from Boston, Massachusetts, United States to Liverpool, Lancashire. She consequently put in to Saint John's, Newfoundland, British North America.
John Nussey	(United Kingdom of Great Britain and Ireland) Victoria	The ship was wrecked near Western Port with the loss of five lives.
Merchant Packet	United Kingdom	The brig was abandoned in the Atlantic Ocean (46°56′N 08°08′W). Her crew were rescued by Neptune (United Kingdom). Merchant Packet was on a voyage from Sunderland, County Durham to Lisbon, Portugal.

== 15 August ==
List of shipwrecks: 15 August 1858
Ship	State	Description
Louis Charles	United Kingdom	The ship was run down and sunk by Port Glasgow (United Kingdom) off Southwold, Suffolk. Her crew were rescued by Port Glasgow.

== 16 August ==
List of shipwrecks: 16 August 1858
Ship	State	Description
Courier	United Kingdom	The ship ran aground on the Cockle Sand, in the North Sea off the coast of Norfolk. She was refloated and an attempt was made to assisted her in to Great Yarmouth, Norfolk but she consequently sank at Gorleston, Suffolk.
London	United Kingdom	The schooner was driven ashore on Grand Manan, Nova Scotia, British North America. She was on a voyage from Boston, Massachusetts, United States to Saint John, New Brunswick, British North America. She was declared a total loss.

== 17 August ==
List of shipwrecks: 17 August 1858
Ship	State	Description
Henry and Emma	United Kingdom	The full-rigged ship was wrecked on "Ras Haroon" with the loss of six of her fifteen crew. Survivors were rescued some time later by HMS Chesapeake (Royal Navy).
Spitfire	United Kingdom	The brig struck a rock and foundered off the coast of Cuba with the loss of all nine crew.

== 18 August ==
List of shipwrecks: 18 August 1858
Ship	State	Description
Amy Ann	United Kingdom	The brig ran aground on "Wrangelholm" and sank. She was on a voyage from Kronstadt, Russia to London.
Langgarten	Prussia	The full-rigged ship ran aground on the Alligator Reef. She was on a voyage from Trinidad de Cuba, Cuba to London, United Kingdom. She was refloated on 20 August and taken in to Key West, Florida, United States.
Maid of the Mist	United Kingdom	The steamship struck rocks off Panazatan Island, Spanish East Indies and foundered. She was on a voyage from Manila, Spanish East Indies to Liverpool, Lancashire. The wreck was subsequently plundered and burnt.

== 19 August ==
List of shipwrecks: 19 August 1858
Ship	State	Description
Alice	United Kingdom	The steamship ran aground at Smyrna, Ottoman Empire. She was on a voyage from London to Smyrna.
Trine	United Kingdom	The ship foundered in the Atlantic Ocean off Land's End, Cornwall. Her crew were rescued by San Francisco (United Kingdom). Trine was on a voyage from Cardiff, Glamorgan to Barcelona, Spain.

== 20 August ==
List of shipwrecks: 20 August 1858
Ship	State	Description
Agnes	United Kingdom	The brigantine was driven ashore and wrecked at Lowestoft, Suffolk. Her crew survived. She was on a voyage from the River Tyne to Galway.
Cherub	United Kingdom	The brig was wrecked at Allinge, Denmark. Her crew were rescued. She was on a voyage from Riga, Russia to Belfast, County Antrim.
Harmony	United Kingdom	The brig was wrecked on the Nieuwe Sand, in the North Sea off the coast of Zeeland, Netherlands. Her crew were rescued. She was on a voyage from Newcastle upon Tyne, Northumberland to Rotterdam, South Holland, Netherlands.
Meline Helois	France	The brigantine ran aground on the Goodwin Sands, Kent, United Kingdom. She was refloated and resumed her voyage.

== 21 August ==
List of shipwrecks: 21 August 1858
Ship	State	Description
Amulet	United Kingdom	The brig was wrecked on the Whitby Rock. Her eight crew were rescued by the Whitby Lifeboat. She was on a voyage from Sunderland, County Durham to Lisbon, Portugal.
Frolic	United Kingdom	The ship capsized at Muar, Malaya with the loss of twenty of her crew. There were two of three survivors. She was on a voyage from Malacca, Malaya to Singapore, Straits Settlements.
Jane	United Kingdom	The ship ran aground on the Barber Sand, in the North Sea off the coast of Norfolk. She was refloated and towed in to Great Yarmouth, Norfolk.
Undaunted	United Kingdom	The galiot was driven ashore at Lowestoft, Suffolk. She was on a voyage from London to Hartlepool, County Durham. She was refloated and taken in to Lowestoft, Suffolk.

== 22 August ==
List of shipwrecks: 22 August 1858
Ship	State	Description
Christine	Norway	The schooner foundered at anchor off Flat Holm, Glamorgan, United Kingdom. She was on a voyage from Stavanger to Newport, Monmouthshire, United Kingdom.
Doris	United Kingdom	The ship ran aground on the Corton Sand, in the North Sea off the coast of Suffolk. She was on a voyage from London to Hartlepool, County Durham. She was refloated and taken in to Lowestoft, Suffolk in a leaky condition.
James and Eleanor	United Kingdom	The ship ran aground on the Barber Sand, in the North Sea off the coast of Suffolk. She was on a voyage from London to Blyth, Northumberland. James and Eleanor was refloated the next day and resumed her voyage.
Marie Mathilde	France	The schooner was driven ashore at Ness Point, Suffolk. She was on a voyage from Dunkirk, Nord to Sunderland, County Durham. She was refloated and taken in to Lowestoft.
Minnet	United Kingdom	The brig was driven ashore at Lowestoft. She was on a voyage from Portsmouth, Hampshire to Newcastle upon Tyne, Northumberland. She was refloated with the assistance of a tug and resumed her voyage.
Rotherham	United Kingdom	The schooner was wrecked on the Barber Sand, in the North Sea off the coast of Norfolk. Her crew survived. She was on a voyage from London to Goole, Yorkshire. She subsequently floated off and came ashore at Caister-on-Sea, Norfolk.
xxxx	United Kingdom	The ship .
Sarah	United Kingdom	The ship ran aground at the Sand Head, Isle of Wight. She was refloated.
Times	United Kingdom	The steamship foundered in the North Sea 35 nautical miles (65 km) off Harlingen, Friesland, Netherlands. Her crew took to the boats and were rescued by various vessels. She was on a voyage from Harlingen to Newcastle upon Tyne, Northumberland.

== 24 August ==
List of shipwrecks: 24 August 1858
Ship	State	Description
Adalbert	Flag unknown	The brig was wrecked on the Longsand, in the North Sea off the coast of Essex, United Kingdom. Her crew were rescued by a lugger. She was on a voyage from Hull, Yorkshire to Genoa, Kingdom of Sardinia.
Biarrot	France	The schooner ran aground on the Kentish Knock and sank. Her crew were rescued by a lugger. She was on a voyage from Dunkirk, Nord to Newcastle upon Tyne, Northumberland, United Kingdom.
Eastern City	United Kingdom	The full-rigged ship was destroyed by fire in the South Atlantic. All 227 people on board were rescued by Merchantman (United Kingdom). Eastern City was on a voyage from Liverpool, Lancashire to Melbourne, Victoria.
Felix	Venezuela	The sloop was sunk at Puerto Caballo by a squadron of French Navy and Royal Navy vessels.

== 25 August ==
List of shipwrecks: 25 August 1858
Ship	State	Description
Dart	United Kingdom	The schooner capsized and sank. Her crew were rescued. She was on a voyage from Montrose, Forfarshire to Charlestown, Cornwall.

== 26 August ==
List of shipwrecks: 26 August 1858
Ship	State	Description
Mary Muncaster	United Kingdom	The ship driven into a Russian steamship and severely damaged in a gale at Odesa.
New Brunswick	(United Kingdom of Great Britain and Ireland) British North America	The barque foundered in Lake Erie 5 nautical miles (9.3 km) off Romney, Province of Canada with the loss of five of her nine crew.

== 27 August ==
List of shipwrecks: 27 August 1858
Ship	State	Description
Abeona	United Kingdom	The ship departed from Old Calabar, Africa for Liverpool, Lancashire. She subsequently foundered in the Atlantic Ocean; wreckage from the ship washed up on Terceira Island, Azores on 28 November.
Florist	United Kingdom	The brig was driven ashore at "Gioja", Kingdom of the Two Sicilies. Her crew were rescued.
Havelock	United Kingdom	The brigantine was wrecked on a reef off the Fortaleza del Cerro, Montevideo, Uruguay. She was on a voyage from Liverpool, Lancashire to Montevideo.
Mary Jane	United Kingdom	The ship was driven ashore at Liverpool. She was on a voyage from Glasgow, Renfrewshire to Liverpool. She was refloated with the assistance of a tug and towed in to Liverpool in a leaky condition.

== 28 August ==
List of shipwrecks: 28 August 1858
Ship	State	Description
Duke of Norfolk	United Kingdom	The ship ran aground in the Onega River. She was refloated and taken in to the Kio Roads in a leaky condition. She was consequently condemned.

== 29 August ==
List of shipwrecks: 29 August 1858
Ship	State	Description
Cricketer & Teazer	United Kingdom	The pilot boat collided with a Russian steamship off Southwold, Suffolk and foundered. Her thirteen crew were rescued.

== 30 August ==
List of shipwrecks: 30 August 1858
Ship	State	Description
Amiable Teresa	France	The barque ran aground on the Longsand, in the North Sea off the coast of Essex, United Kingdom. She was on a voyage from Galaţi, Ottoman Empire to Ipswich, Suffolk, United Kingdom. She was refloated with the assistance of the smacks Aid, John and William and Marco Polo (all United Kingdom) and taken in to Harwich, Essex.
Edward A. Sand	(United Kingdom of Great Britain and Ireland) British North America	The brig driven ashore in Horseshoe Bay with the loss of six lives. She was on a voyage from Navy Bay to the Gulf of Mexico.

== 31 August ==
List of shipwrecks: 31 August 1858
Ship	State	Description
Anglesea	United Kingdom	The brig was in collision with Hoang-ho (United Kingdom) and sank off The Smalls. Her crew were rescued by Hoang-ho. Anglesea was on a voyage from Liverpool, Lancashire to Saint Thomas, Virgin Islands.
Clydesdale	United Kingdom	The cutter ran aground in Carlingford Bay. She was on a voyage from Paisley, Renfrewshire to London. She was refloated and beached at Warrenpoint, County Down.
Fred	United Kingdom	The Mersey Flat was run ashore at Liverpool, Lancashire. All on board were rescued by the tug John Bull United Kingdom and the Magazines Lifeboat. Fred was on a voyage from Mostyn, Flintshire to Liverpool.

== Unknown date ==
List of shipwrecks: Unknown date in August 1858
Ship	State	Description
Atrevida	Flag unknown	The ship ran aground on a reef off Cape Jervis, South Australia.
Catharina	Netherlands	The ship sank at Saint Petersburg, Russia before 13 August. She was on a voyage from Saint Petersburg to Helsingør, Denmark.
Deane	France	The steamship ran aground off Brest, Finistère.
Ellen	United Kingdom	The brig foundered off Walton-on-the-Naze, Essex.
Fifeshire	United Kingdom	The ship wrecked near "Acheon" before 27 September.
Heroine	United Kingdom	The brigantine sprang a leak and foundered in the Atlantic Ocean off Land's End, Cornwall. Her crew survived. She was on a voyage from Swansea, Glamorgan to Southampton, Hampshire.
Kielmansegge	Hamburg	The steamship ran aground at Cuxhaven before 18 August.
Palmyra	United Kingdom	The ship sank off "White Island", Province of Canada, British North America before 14 August. She was on a voyage from Newport, Monmouthshire to Quebec City, Province of Canada, British North America. Palmyra had been refloated by 27 August and towed to the Brandy Pots Sandbank, where she was beached. She was towed in to Quebec City on 11 September.
Pauline Houghton	United Kingdom	The ship foundered in the Indian Ocean before 23 August. She was on a voyage from Mauritius to Moulmein, Burma.
Poydras	Mexico	The steamship foundered. All on board were rescued.
Santander Bilboa	Spain	The steamship struck a rock off Point Gurfante and sank with the loss of life. There were 75 people on board; variously reported as four survivors or seven or eight deaths. She was on a voyage from Santander to Bilbao.
Walton Shaw	United Kingdom	The ship ran aground on the Carysfort Reef before 10 August She was on a voyage from Havana, Cuba to Falmouth, Cornwall. She was refloated and assisted in to Key West, Florida, United States.
