= Ocean Telegraph =

Clipper ship (1854 to 1923)

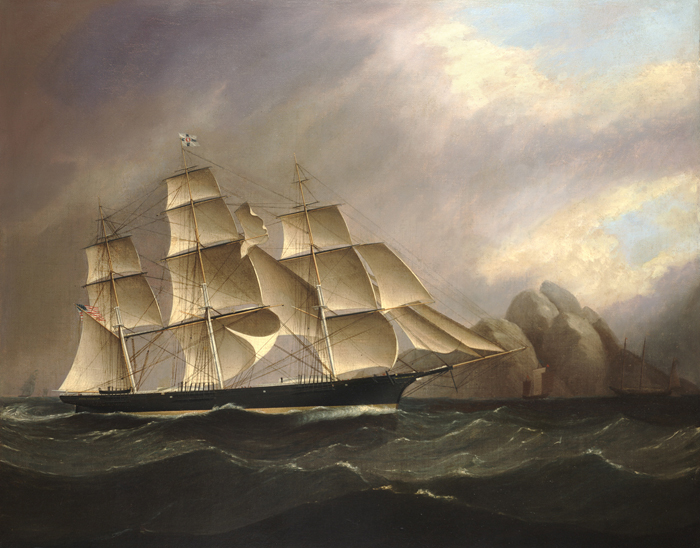
- Ocean Telegraph by James E. Buttersworth, 1858

History
- Name: 1854: Ocean Telegraph; 1863: Light Brigade
- Namesake: 1863: Light Brigade of the British Army
- Owner: 1854: Reed, Wade & Co; 1863: James Baines & Co.; 1865: JM Mackay; 1869: Thomas M Mackay; 1871: Taylor, Bethell & Roberts; 1872: Arthur Bilbrough; 1874: William Williams; 1875: Achilles Wood Wright & Co; 1876: Cork Harbour Docks & Warehouses Co; 1878: Achilles Wood Wright & Co; 1881: Sir John Arnott & Co; 1884: James F Gibb; 1884: MA Serfaty; 1885: Yomtob Bergel; 1902: The British Coal Co (Gibraltar)
- Operator: 1863: Black Ball Line
- Port of registry: 1854: (United States) Boston; 1864: (United Kingdom of Great Britain and Ireland) London; 1875: (United Kingdom of Great Britain and Ireland) Cork; 1884: (United Kingdom of Great Britain and Ireland) Gibraltar
- Route: 1854: New York – San Francisco; 1863: London – Australia – New Zealand; 1871: London – Queensland
- Builder: James O. Curtis, Medford
- Launched: March 29, 1854
- Identification: UK official number 45775; UK code letters VFQN
- Fate: Deleted from registers after 1923

General characteristics
- Type: wooden-hulled clipper
- Tonnage: 1,244 Moorsom System; 1874: 1,244 NRT, 1,272 GRT
- Tons burthen: 1,495 BM
- Length: 212.9 ft (64.9 m)
- Beam: 40.4 ft (12.3 m)
- Depth: 25.2 ft (7.7 m)
- Sail plan: 1854: full rig; 1876: barque

Ocean Telegraph was a clipper ship that was built in Massachusetts in 1854 and was last known of in Gibraltar in 1923. She was in US ownership until 1863, when UK interests bought her and renamed her Light Brigade.

As Ocean Telegraph the ship sailed between New York and San Francisco. As Light Brigade she at first carried cargo and migrants between the United Kingdom, Australia and New Zealand.

For her first two decades she was a full-rigged ship. In 1876 Light Brigade was converted into a barque. From 1883 she was a coal hulk at Gibraltar to bunker steamships. She was still recorded as being registered in Gibraltar in 1923.

== Building ==
Ocean Telegraph was designed by the Boston-based naval architect Samuel Hartt Pook, who designed several very fast clipper ships. James O. Curtis built her at Medford, up the Mystic River from Boston. She was launched on March 29, 1854.

Her registered length was 212.9 ft (64.9 m), her beam was 40.4 ft (12.3 m) and her depth was 25.2 ft (7.7 m). Her tonnages were 1,495 BM and 1,244 Moorsom System. She had a wooden hull, three masts, and was completed as a full-rigged ship.

Ocean Telegraph was described as "a very sharp clipper and said to be one of the most perfect ships ever built". "No expense was spared to make her one of the most perfect and beautiful ships ever built. The bow raked boldly forward, flaring gracefully, and was ornamented with a beautiful carved female figure with forks of lightning playing around She was very sharp, with a long, clean run tapering like that of a pilot boat. Her light and graceful stern was ornamented with carved work around a figure of Neptune. She had a fine sheer, and every line and molding harmonized her whole length."

In common with other clipper ships of the day her hull was painted black, and the bottom of the hull was sheathed with copper. Her black hull can be clearly seen, and the copper can just be seen above the waves, in an 1858 painting by James E. Buttersworth.

== American clipper ==
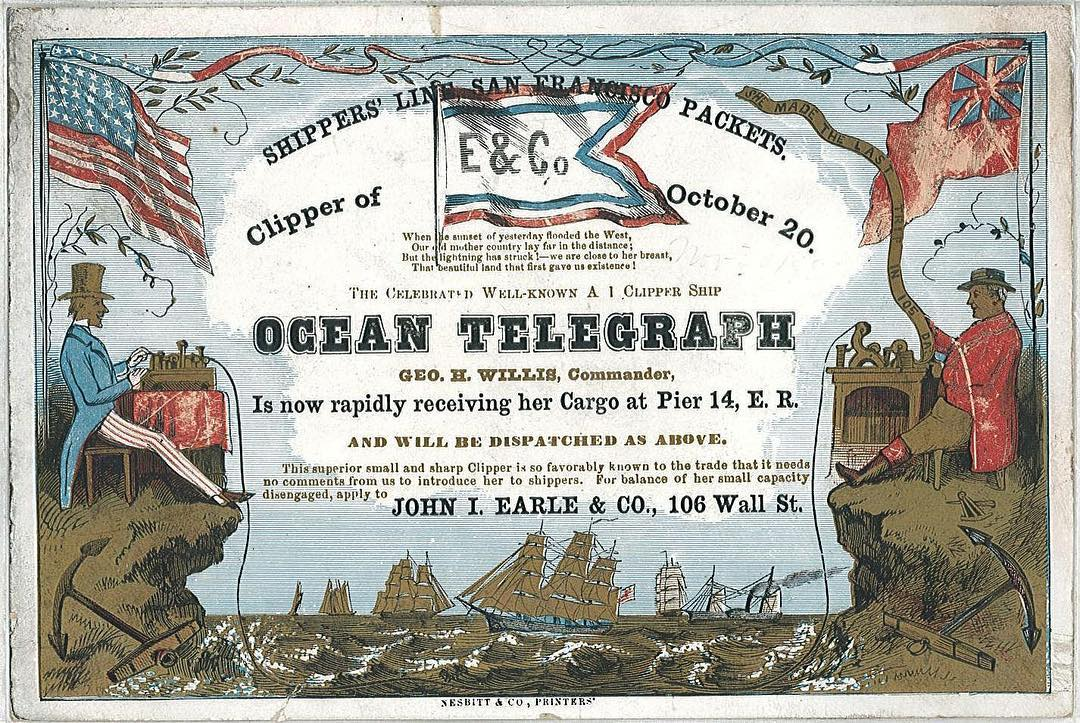
Ocean Telegraph, sailing card, Geo. H. Willis, Commander

Ocean Telegraph was built for Reed, Wade & Co. of Boston, who sailed her on their "Shippers Line of San Francisco Packets" between New York and San Francisco via Cape Horn. This remained her route until 1863. Like many clippers at the time, she was sometimes unable to procure a return cargo and had to return to New York in ballast.

Commanded by Captain Little, Ocean Telegraph took part in a race from New York to San Francisco in 1859–60 against Great Republic. Ocean Telegraph completed the voyage in 109 days, beating Great Republic by one day. This put her for the second time on the list of clipper ships to make the journey in 110 days or less. She sailed from 50° S in the Pacific to the Equator in 19 days, making her one of 36 ships to cover that distance in 20 days or fewer. She sailed from the Equator to San Francisco in 20 days, making her one of 48 ships to do so in 20 days or fewer.

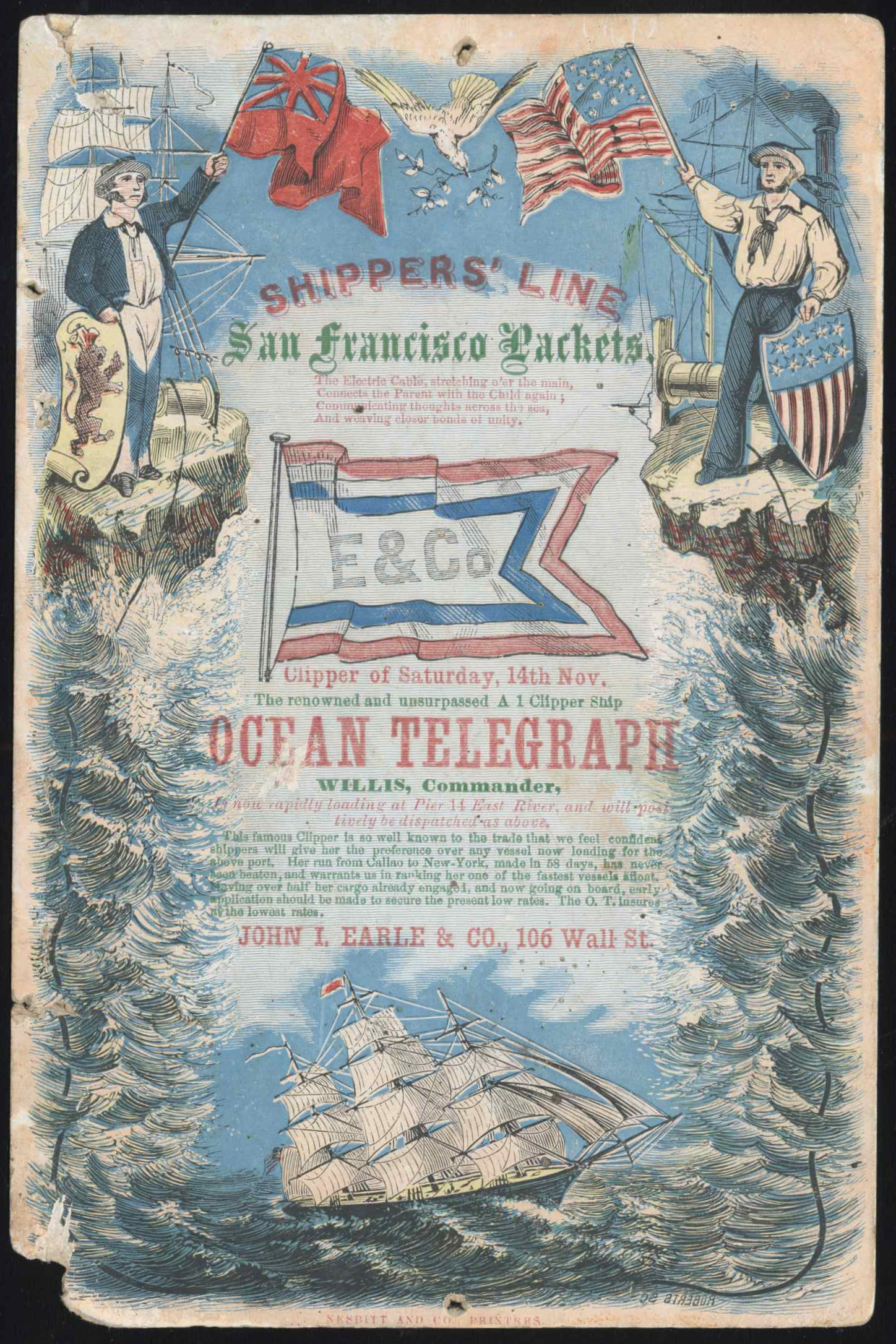
Another sailing card, Willis, Commander

Her fastest outward passage from New York to San Francisco was 105 days and 20 hours. In total she made eight passages with cargo to San Francisco from New York. The average of seven of these is under 117 days, and of the eight is 121 days. She made five passages with cargo from San Francisco to New York, of which four were under 100 days. The average of the five is 96.8 days. Parts of a number of these runs were very close to record. Fastest return passage 90 days. In 1855 she sailed from Callao in Peru to New York in 58 days, believed to be the fastest on record.

The clipper ship trade cards used to advertise Ocean Telegraph had an image of two telegraphers, one American and the other British, facing each other across a sea.

In 1862 she sailed from San Francisco to Queenstown with a cargo of Peruvian guano. In 1863, when it was no longer profitable for her to sail between New York and San Francisco, she was sold.

== British clipper ==
In 1863 James Baines & Co. of Liverpool bought Ocean Telegraph for £7,060 for their Black Ball Line of packet ships, chiefly to sail between London, Australia and New Zealand. She was renamed Light Brigade. By 1864 she was registered in London. She was given the UK official number 45775 and code letters VFQN. By 1865 her main owner was one JM Mackay.

With the Black Ball Line, commanded by Captain Henry Evans, Light Brigade took migrants from London to Brisbane, Queensland in 1863; British troops and their families to Auckland, New Zealand, in 1864 from both Calcutta and Rangoon in British India, and from London, for the New Zealand Wars in two separate voyages. She took migrants from London to Sydney, New South Wales in 1867 and returned to London via Calcutta with cavalry horses for the troops in Calcutta; migrants from London to Lyttelton, New Zealand, in 1867.

By 1869 Light Brigade's main owner was a Thomas M Mackay. She again took migrants from London to Brisbane in 1869 and 1870–71. On this last trip Captain Evans died in Brisbane 10 days before the ship sailed again for London in April 1871 with a mixed cargo of exports from Queensland.

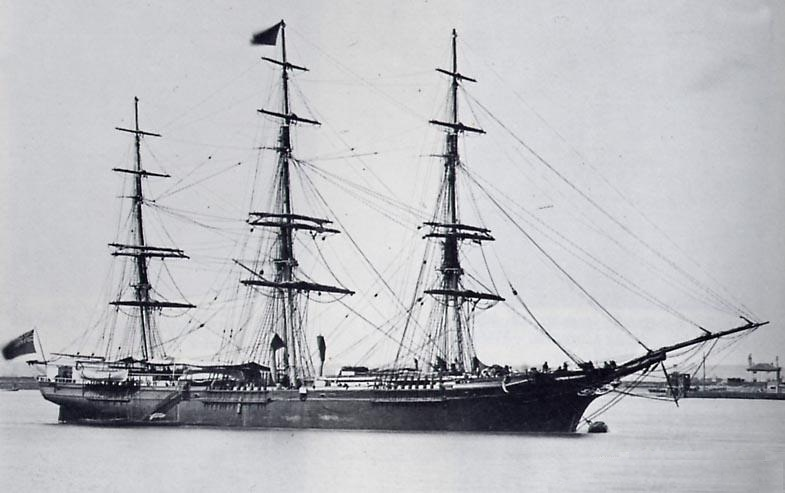
Light Brigade at Gravesend, Kent

In 1871 Taylor, Bethell & Roberts of London bought Light Brigade, chiefly to sail between London and Queensland. By 1872 her main owner was an Arthur Bilbrough of London.

She made two trips from London to Keppel Bay, Queensland: commanded by Captain Holden in 1871–72 and Captain L Davies in 1872–73 (Captain L. Davies). On the first trip The Brisbane Courier described her as "a smart looking full-rigged ship, admirably adapted for the conveyance of passengers and migrants, the various compartments for their accommodation being both roomy and well ventilated. It may be added that the ship 'tween decks presents a clean and orderly appearance." Also on the first trip it was decided that she not travel down to Brisbane but that she return with cargo from Keppel Bay to London. This cargo did not arrive in good condition, so settlers near Keppel Bay decided not to send cargo aboard her again. As a result, on her second trip she sailed down to Sydney in ballast looking for a return cargo.

Each time Light Brigade sailed to Australia and New Zealand in this period she carried about 400 passengers, mail and general cargo. Her passengers for Auckland were soldiers and their families. Most of her passengers for Lyttelton, Sydney, Brisbane, and Keppel Bay were assisted migrants – labourers, domestic servants, and tradespeople for the settlements there. She returned with mail and a small number of passengers, but return cargo to fill the space of the assisted migrants and soldiers was harder to find.

By 1874 Light Brigade's main owner was William Williams of London, and she appeared in Lloyd's Register of British and Foreign Shipping for the first time.

== Irish barque ==
In 1875 Achilles Wood Wright & Co acquired Light Brigade and registered her in Cork, Ireland. By 1876 the Cork Harbour Docks and Warehouses Company had acquired her, and her rig had been reduced to a barque.

By 1877 or 1878 Achilles Wood Wright was again the ship's main owner. There are discrepancies about Light Brigade's ownership between her entries in Lloyd's Register and the Mercantile Navy List.

In 1880 or 1881 Sir John Arnott & Co was Light Brigade's main owner. Arnott was a prominent entrepreneur in Cork, and the first of the Arnott baronets.

In February 1883 Light Brigade reached Queenstown, Virginia 19 days out of New York, leaking badly. She was subsequently condemned. Lloyd's Register last records her in 1884, still owned by Sir John Arnott & Co.

== Gibraltar hulk ==
Between 1883 and 1885 Light Brigade quickly changed hands. In 1884 the Mercantile Navy List records a James F Gibb of London as her main owner. Lloyd's Register records her main owner as MA Serfaty, followed by a Yomtob Bergel. 1884 is Lloyd's Register's last record of her. By 1885 she was registered in Gibraltar, where Bergel used her as a coal-hulk.

Light Brigade was still in Bergel's ownership in 1900. By 1902 The British Coal Company (Gibraltar) owned her. The Mercantile Navy List last records her in 1923, still owned by the British Coal Co, and still registered in Gibraltar as a barque.

== See also ==
- List of clipper ships

== Note ==
- One source states that Ocean Telegraph was built by Hayden & Cudworth. This is not supported by any other source. This clipper ship was built by James O. Curtis.
