= USS Onward (1852) =

Gunboat of the United States Navy

History

United States
- Name: Onward
- Owner: Reed, Wade & Co, Boston
- Route: New York City-Boston-San Francisco
- Builder: James. O. Curtis, Medford, MA
- Launched: 3 July 1852
- Acquired: Purchased by J.O. Ogden, 1857 for $32,000

United States
- Name: USS Onward
- Acquired: Purchased by George D. Morgan, U.S. Government Agent, 9 September 1861, for $27,000, for service in the Civil War
- Commissioned: 11 January 1862
- Decommissioned: 13 November 1884
- Fate: Sold in Peru, 1 Nov 1884, for $1,850.

General characteristics
- Class & type: Sailing cruiser, 4th class
- Type: Medium clipper
- Tonnage: 874
- Length: 159 ft (48 m); 175 ft (53 m) LOA
- Beam: 34 ft 8 in (10.57 m)
- Draft: 20 ft 6 in (6.25 m)
- Depth of hold: 20 ft 6 in (6.25 m)
- Propulsion: Sails
- Sail plan: Ship rig, three masts
- Speed: 11 kn (13 mph; 20 km/h)
- Complement: 103
- Armament: 8 × 32-pounder guns, 1 30-pounder Parrott rifle

The first USS Onward was a clipper in the Union Navy.

Onward was launched 3 July 1852 by James O. Curtis at Medford, Massachusetts, for Reed, Wade, and Co., of Boston, Massachusetts, and operated in the merchant service between New York City, Boston, and San Francisco. Purchased by the U.S. Navy at New York City from John Ogden on 9 September 1861, for service in the American Civil War, Onward commissioned at New York Navy Yard on 11 January 1862, Acting Volunteer Lieutenant J. Frederick Nickels in command.

== Construction ==
"Her lines were convex; for a figurehead she had the Goddess of Liberty robed in the American ensign, the right hand pointing forward, the left, grasping the emblems of harvest, one foot rested on a carved representation of the globe. The stern was curvilinear, ornamented with an American Indian, surrounded with gilt work. Under the name and hailing port, the words 'According to law' appeared in carved, white letters." Overseeing her construction was her first commander, Captain Jesse G. Cotting.

== Voyages as California clipper ==
Boston to S.F., under Capt. Cotting, 120 days, arrived 1 December 1852.

New York to S.F., under Capt. Thomas F. Wade, 150 or 151 days, arrived 25 January 1854. "She was followed closely by the Ocean Pearl, Kingfisher, Bald Eagle, Courier, and Pampero ... The Kingfisher under Crosby and the Bald Eagle, in command of Caldwell, had sailed a notable race ... They fought it out almost jibboom to jibboom for 17,000 miles and entered San Francisco almost within hailing distance of each other."

New York to S.F., under Capt. Luce, 158 days, arrived 15 October 1856. On this passage she spent 26 days rounding the Horn, encountering 18 days of hurricane-force winds, damaging the deck house and rigging; and 20 days of almost dead calm after crossing the Equator in the Pacific.

Her passage from San Francisco to Singapore, of 43 days, arriving 15 Dec 1856, under Capt. E.A. Luce., was stated to be a record, according to the 23 Dec 1856 "Singapore Times."

Homeward passages, Honolulu to New York, 113 days. Shanghai to London, 89 days from Anjer. Melbourne to London in 114 days from Calcutta. Shanghai to New York in 115 days, arriving 21 June 1861

== Assigned to the South Atlantic Blockade ==
Assigned to the South Atlantic Blockading Squadron, Onward arrived at Port Royal, South Carolina on 28 January, and operated along the coasts of Georgia and Florida before taking station off Charleston.

On 12 March, with four other Union ships, she captured blockade runner Emily St. Pierre of Charleston attempting to slip into Charleston Harbor laden with gunny cloth from Calcutta, India needed for baling Southern cotton. On 26 April, she forced schooner Chase aground on Raccoon Key near Cape Romain, South Carolina, and destroyed her. She drove schooner Sarah aground at Bull's Bay, South Carolina, where she was destroyed by her own crew to prevent capture on 1 May. Twelve days later off Charleston, she accepted USS Planter from Robert Smalls, a runaway slave, who had slipped out of Charleston Harbor with the Confederate steamer while her officers were ashore.

== Searching for Confederate blockade runners ==
In September, Onward sailed north for repairs and, when back in fighting trim, she sailed on 30 March 1863 for the South Atlantic and was used for the rest of the war as a cruiser on the high seas hunting Confederate commerce raiders. In May, Onward and USS Mohican cornered Confederate tenders Agrippina and Castor which supplied coal, gunpowder, and provisions for Southern raiders CSS Alabama and Georgia, in Bahia, Brazil and hemmed them in port until they were forced to sell their fuel and munitions to obtain clearance from port. This delay prevented the tenders from fulfilling their mission.

== Post-war decommissioning and sale ==
After the war ended, Onward decommissioned at New York City on 20 June 1865. She recommissioned on 5 September 1865. Assigned as store ship (fourth-rate, three guns) to the South Atlantic Squadron,Onward spent much of 1866 anchored at Rio de Janeiro, with voyages to Santos Harbor, Brazil, and Rio de la Plata, Montevideo, Uruguay. In 1867 Onward was attached to the Asiatic Squadron under Rear-Admiral H. H. Bell, sailing from Rio de Janeiro to New York City 5 March - 14 April 1867 under command of Acting Volunteer LTCDR Pierre Giraud. Later Onward was used as a storeship at Callao, Peru until decommissioned on 13 November 1884, and was sold there.

== See also ==
- United States Navy
- List of United States Navy ships
