= James E. Buttersworth =

English painter

San Salvadore (c. 1869–1886) in the collection at The Mariners' Museum.

James Edward Buttersworth (1817–1894) was an English painter who specialized in maritime art and is considered among the foremost ship portraitists in the United States of the nineteenth century. His paintings are particularly known for their meticulous detail, dramatic settings, and grace in movement.

== Early life and education ==
Buttersworth was born in London, England in 1817 to a family of maritime artists. He studied painting with his father Thomas Buttersworth Jr., who was also noted for the genre.

== Career ==
He moved to the United States around 1845 and settled in West Hoboken, New Jersey (now Union City, New Jersey), and also maintained a Brooklyn studio in 1854. He returned to England in 1851 for the Race for the Hundred Pound Cup that took place on 22 August 1851. His sketches and paintings of that yachting competition provide the definitive record of events in that benchmark season of sailing.

Buttersworth's paintings of the 1893 Vigilant v. Valkyrie II Cup match were done one year before his death, completing the chronicling of America's Cup races by oil painting just before the advent of successful photographic imagery. He was inducted into the America's Cup Hall of Fame in 1999. About 600 of his pieces survive today, which are found in private collections and museums all over the United States, including New York, New Jersey, Connecticut, and Virginia, and have also been featured on the television series Antiques Roadshow.

== Gallery ==
Magic and Gracie off Castle Garden (c. 1871), in the collection at The Mariners' Museum

Steamboat Escort off the battery (1863) in the collection at The Mariners' Museum

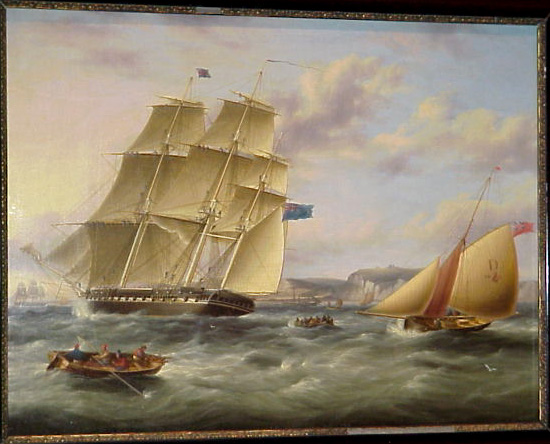
Frigate off Dover (c. 1840) in the collection at The Mariners' Museum

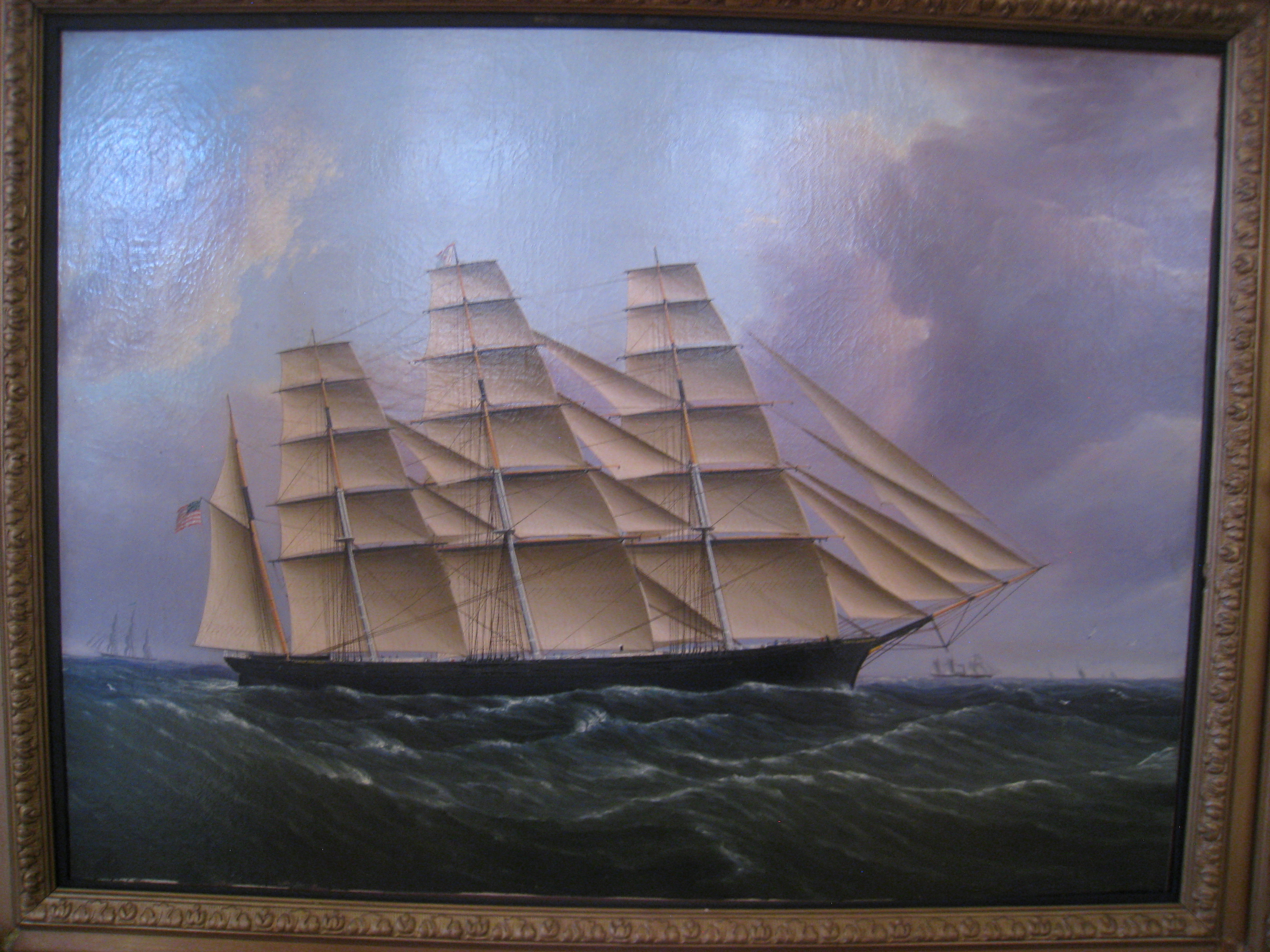
Clipper Ship Great Republic (c. 1853) Old State House Museum, Boston, MA

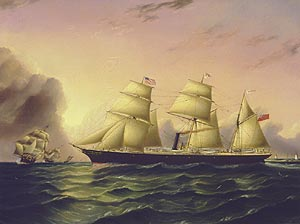
RMS Hibernia (c. 1850s)

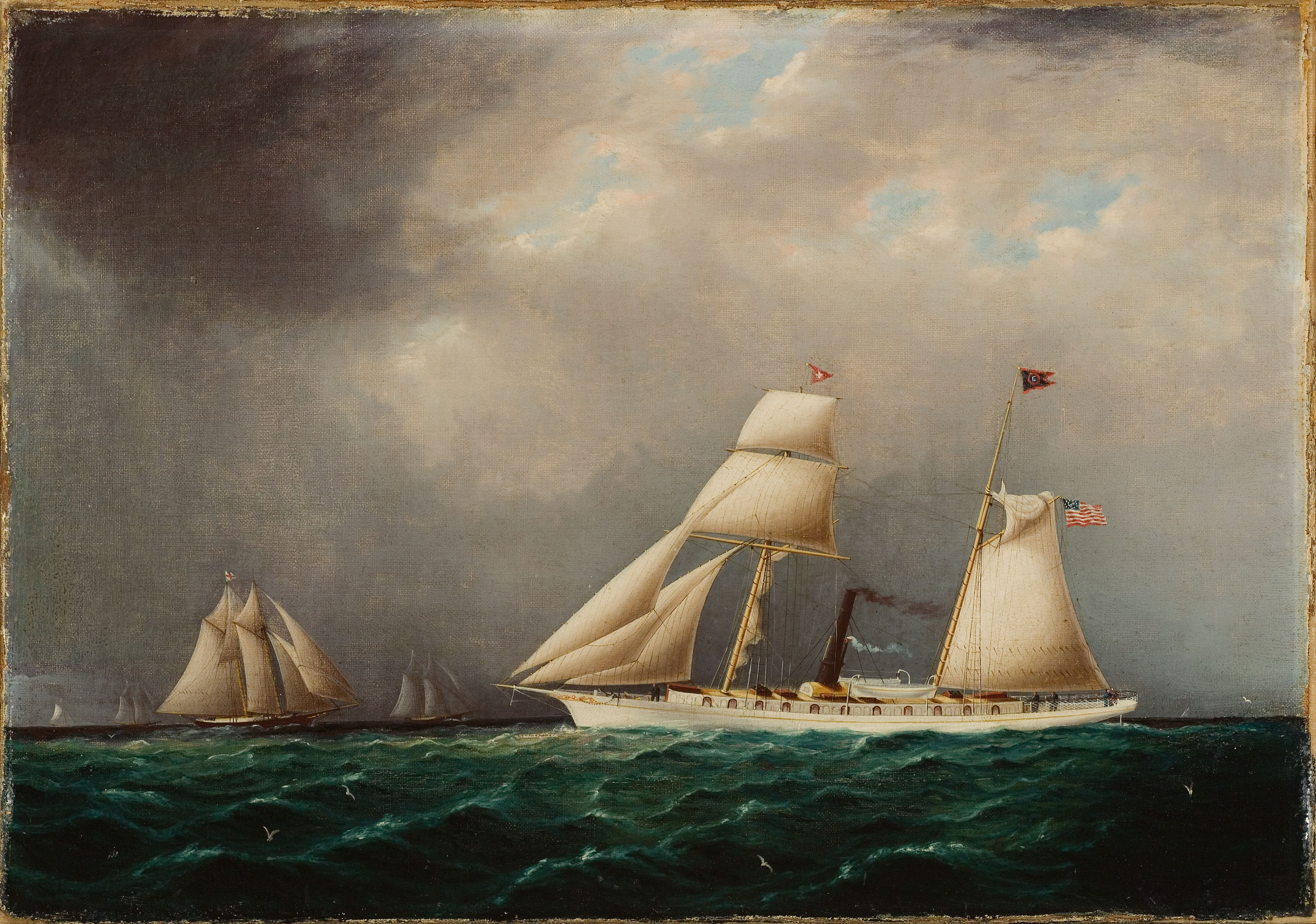
American Steam-Sail Yacht EMILY at Sea with Four Schooners Off Bow (c. 1878)

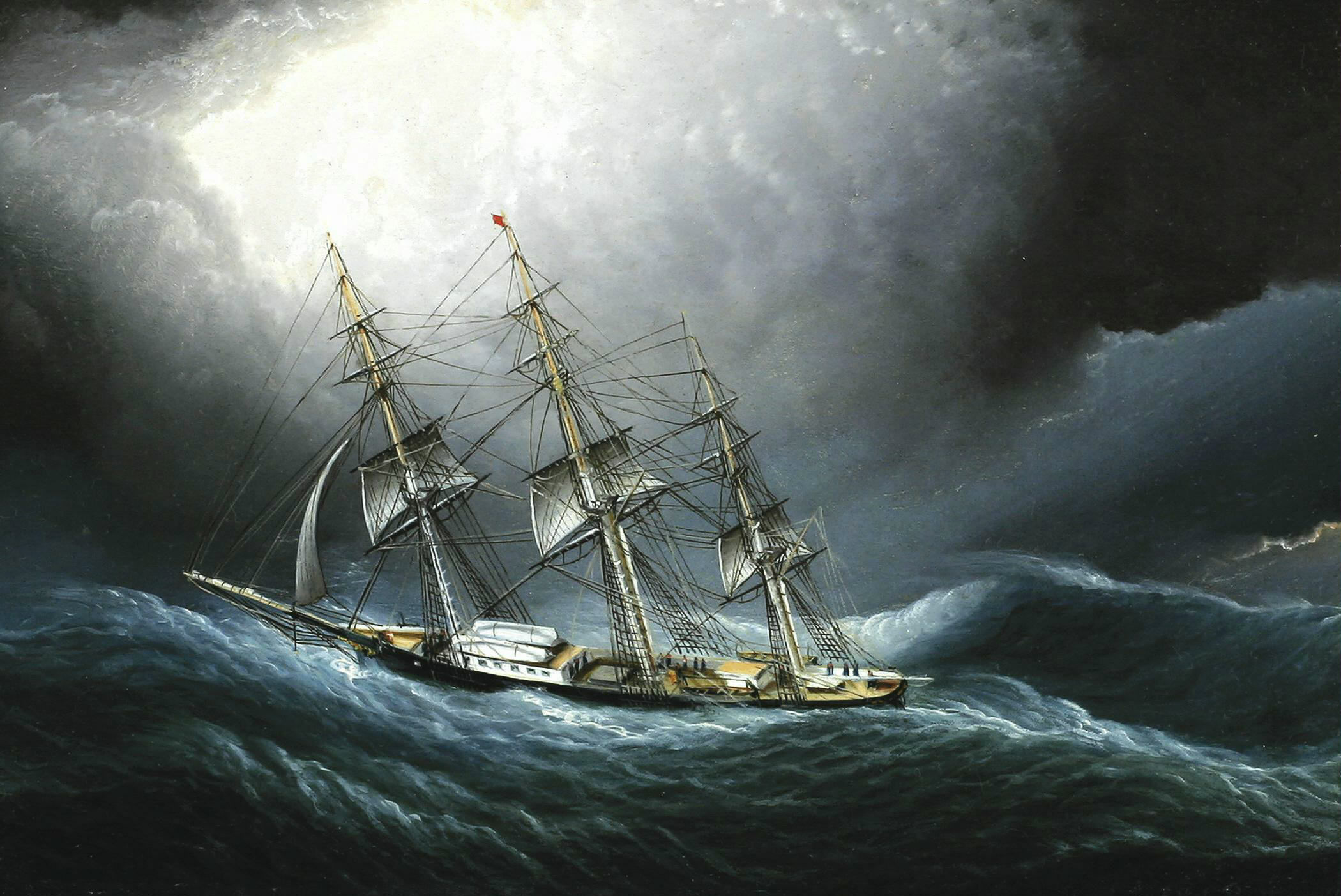
Clipper Ship at Cape Horn

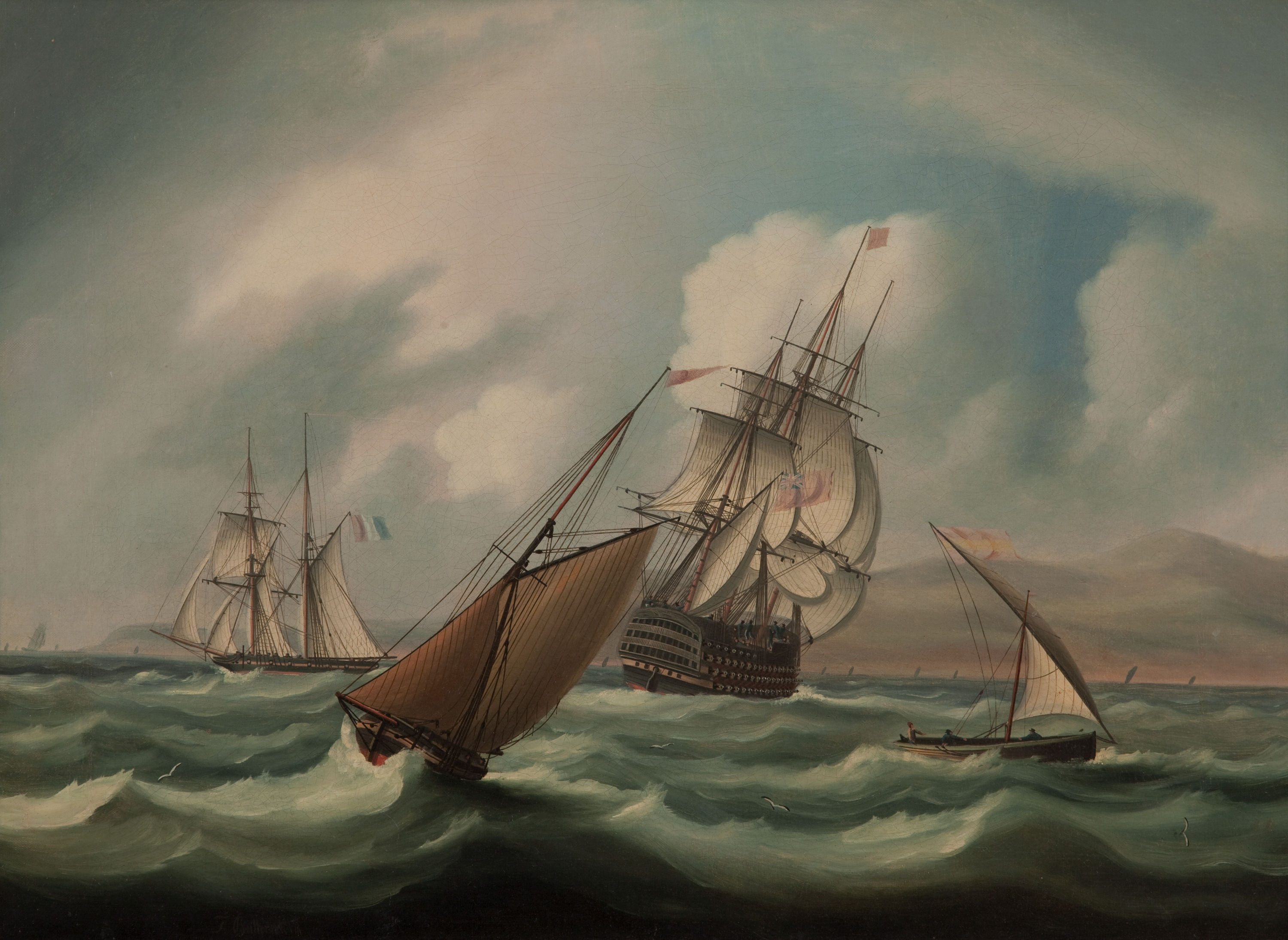
First Rater and Other Shipping off the Spanish Coast

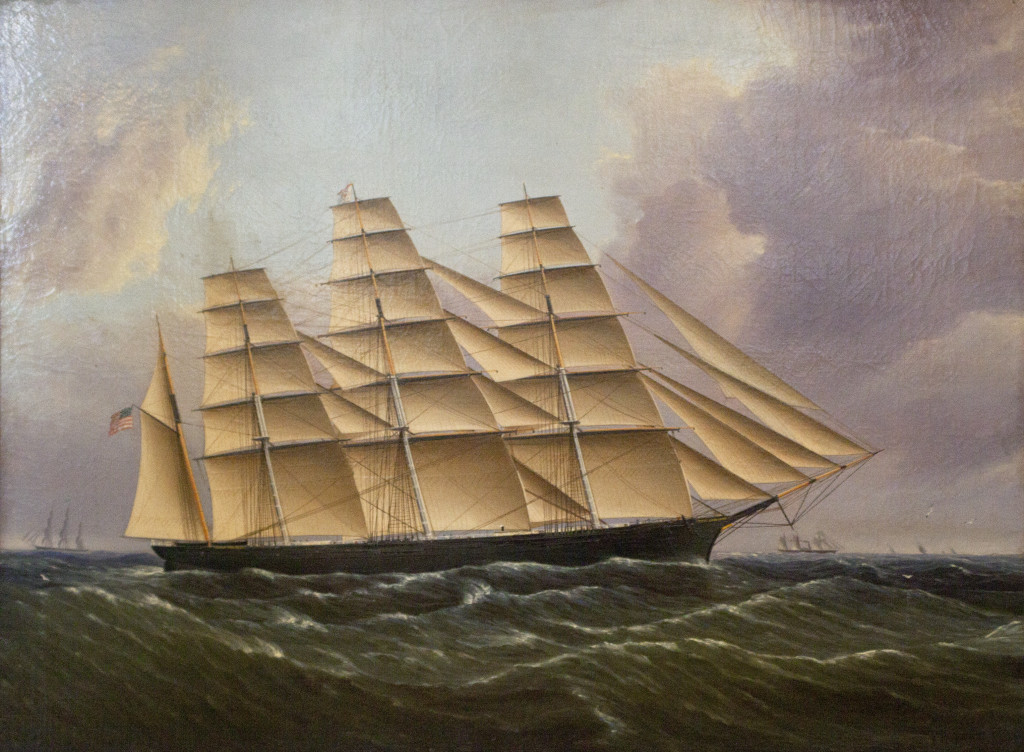
Great Republic (c. 1850s) Old State House Museum, Boston, MA

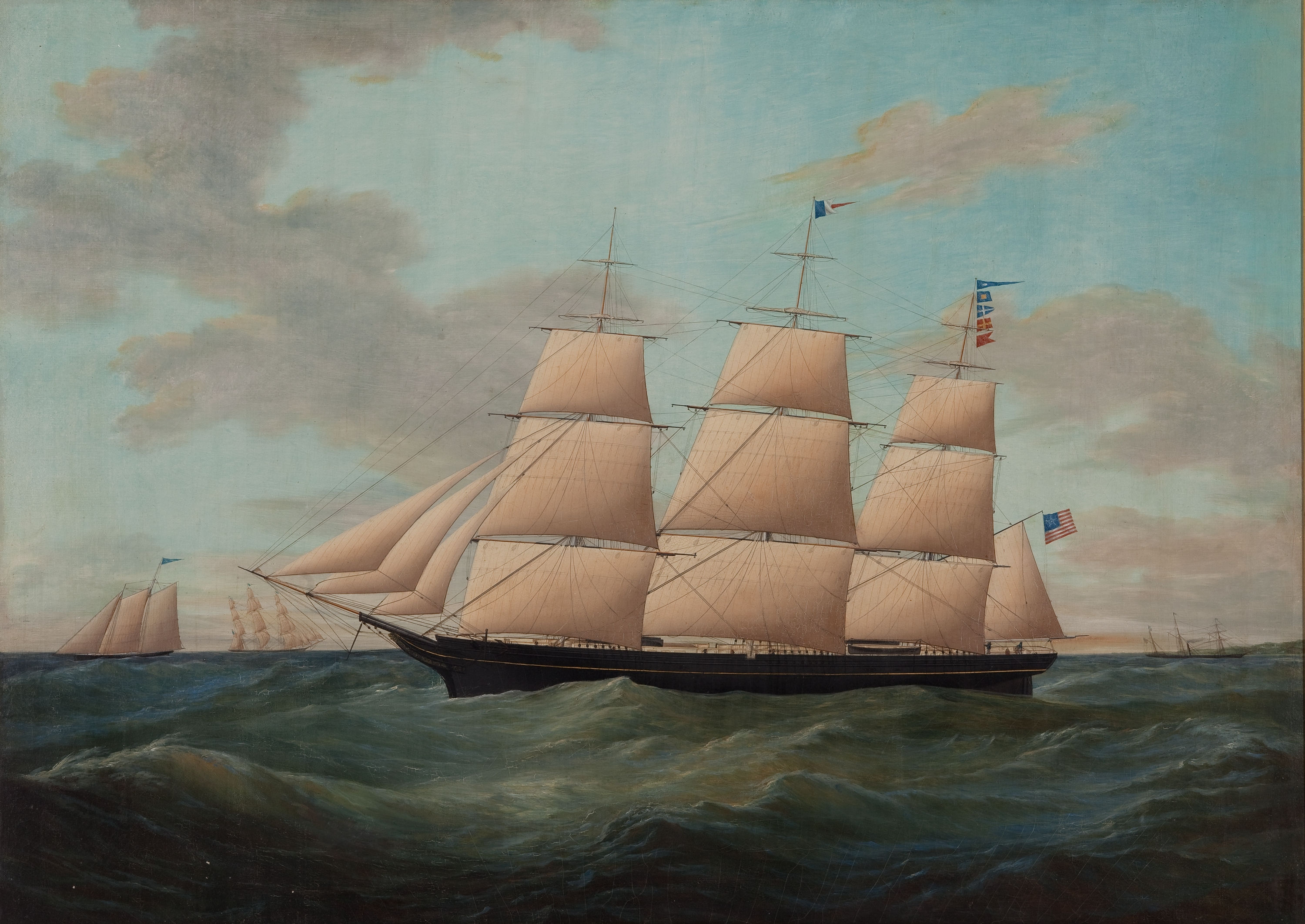
United States

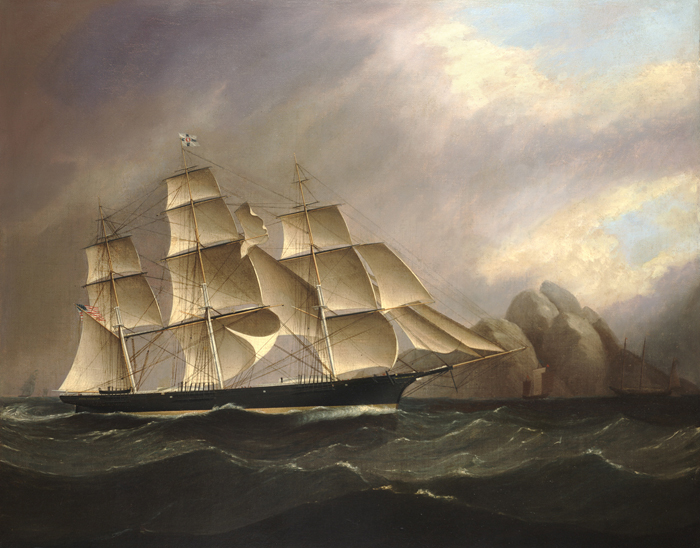
The clipper ship Ocean Telegraph (1858) South Street Seaport Museum

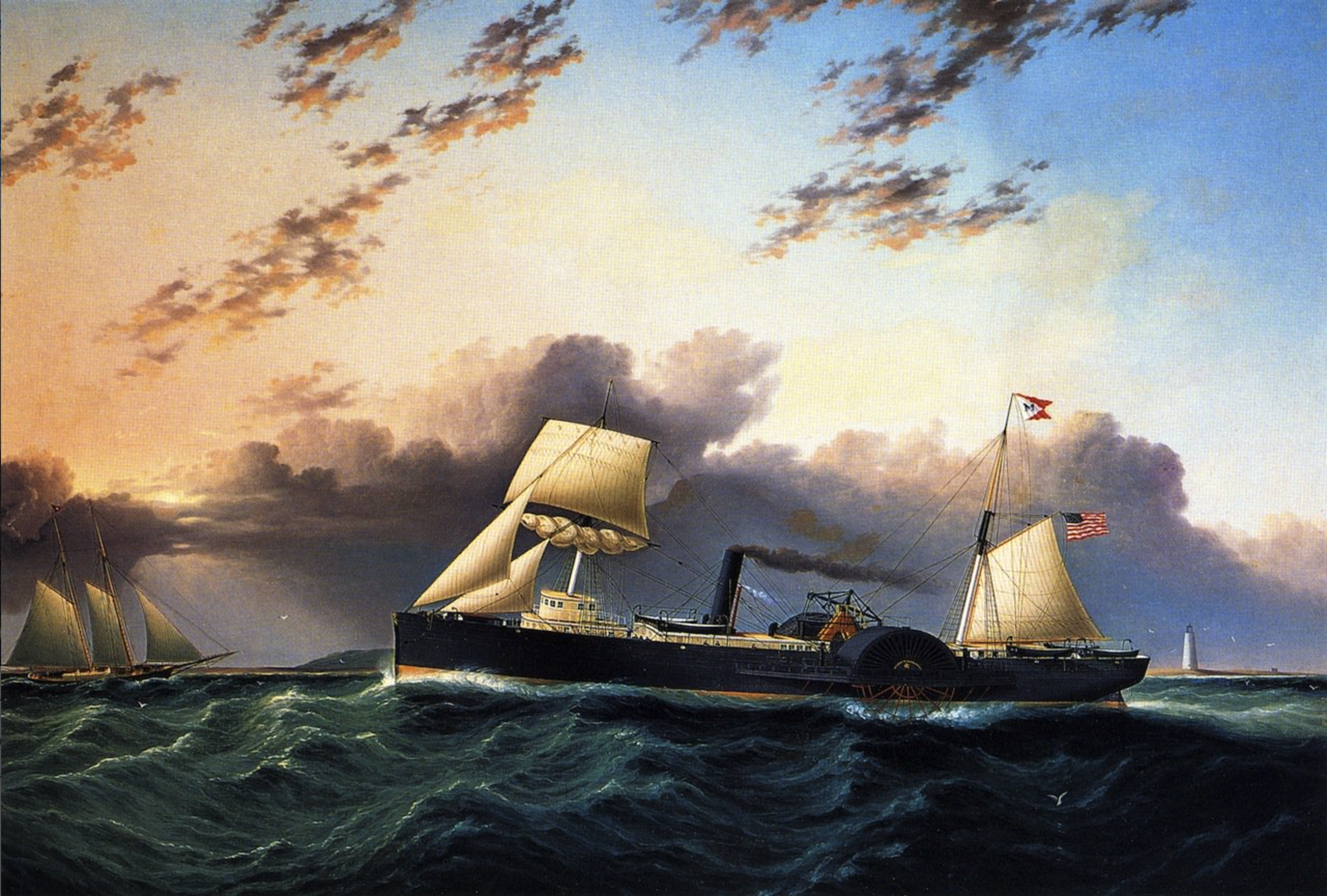
The Steam and Sail Ship Western Metropolis

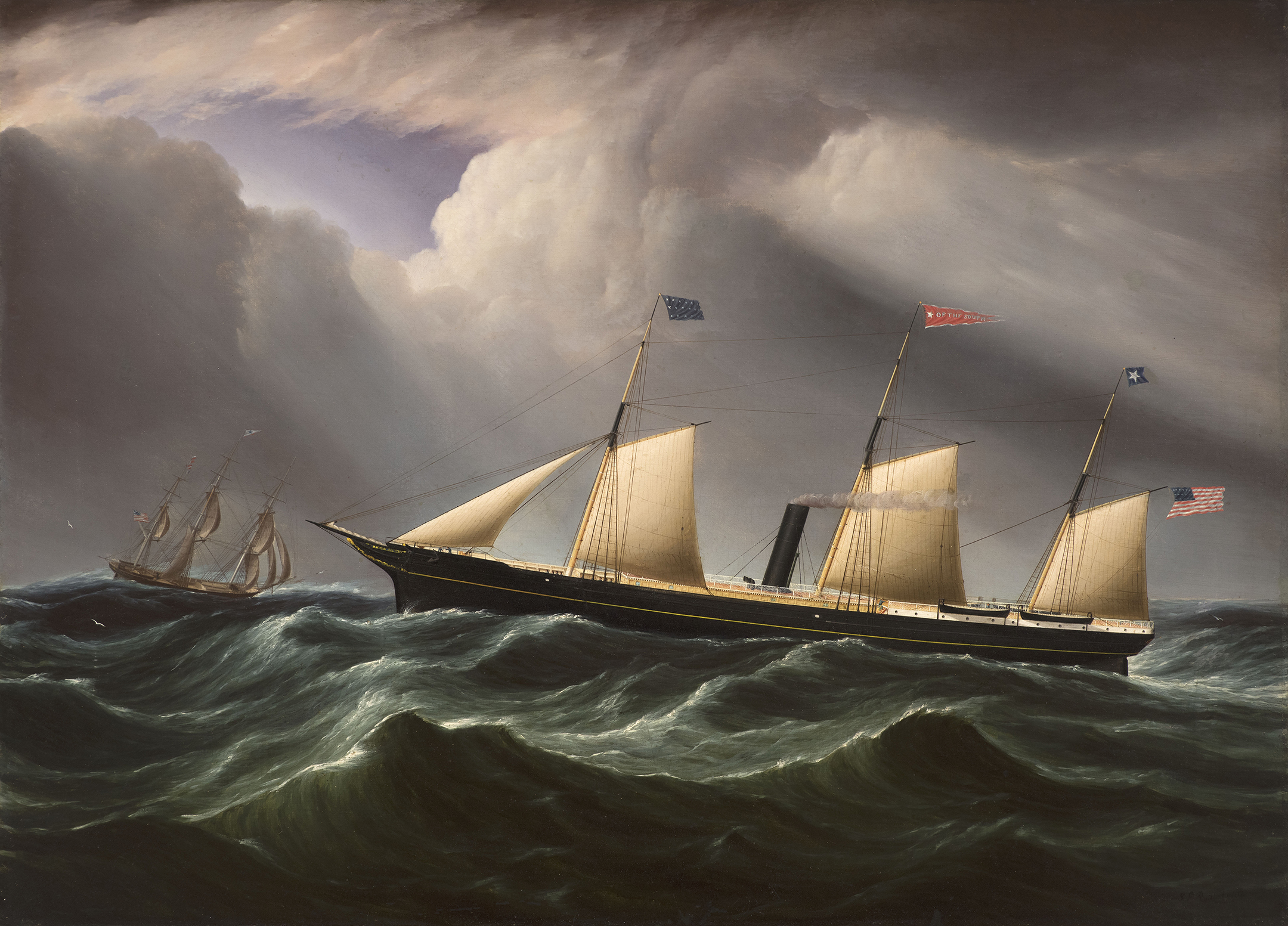
American Steam-sail ship 'American Steam-sail ship Star of the South, passing an American full rigged ship at sea

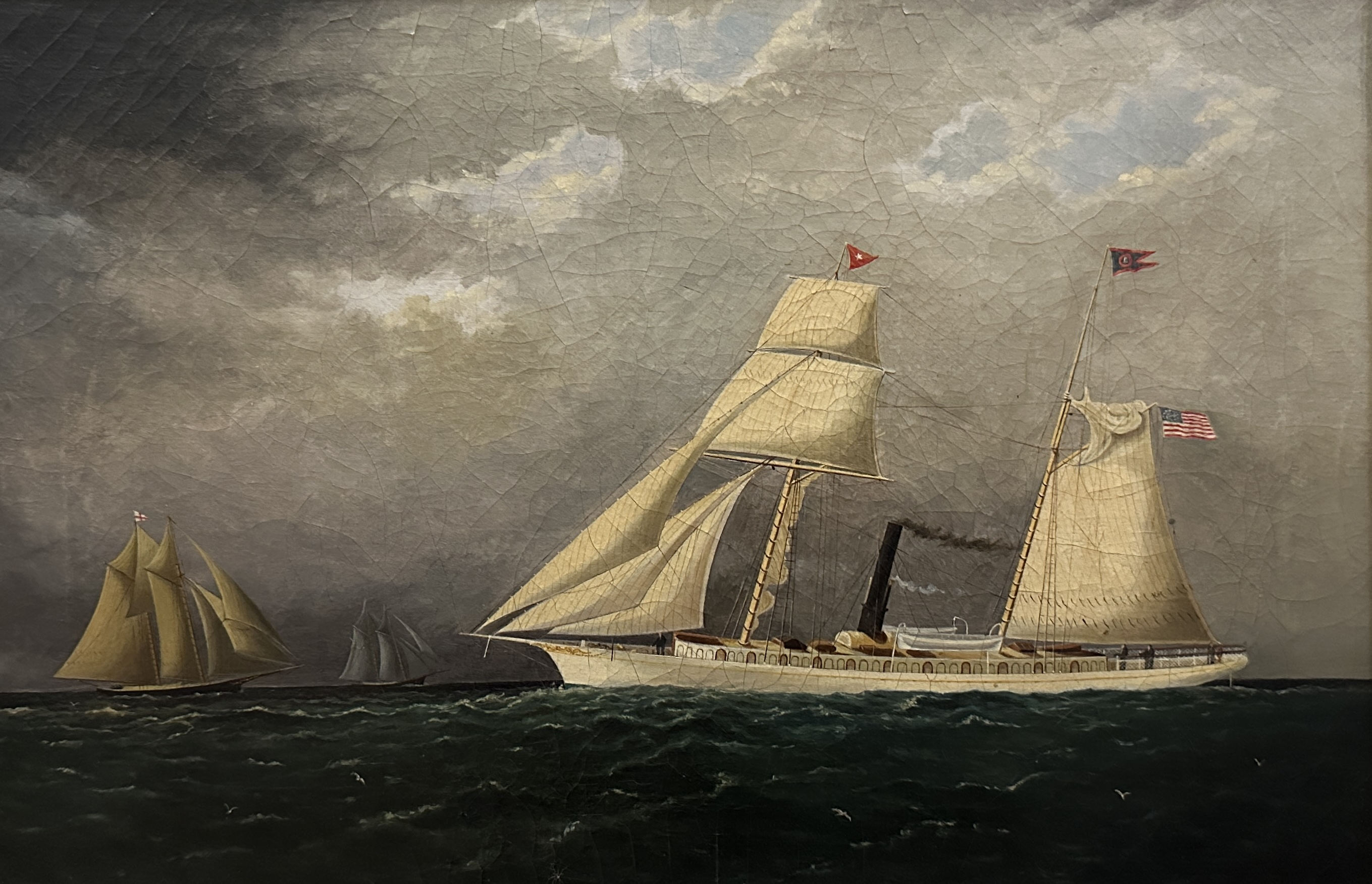
Screw Steam Yacht, Emily (c. 1869-75), Washington County Museum of Fine Arts
