= Shooting Star (clipper) =

1851 clipper ship

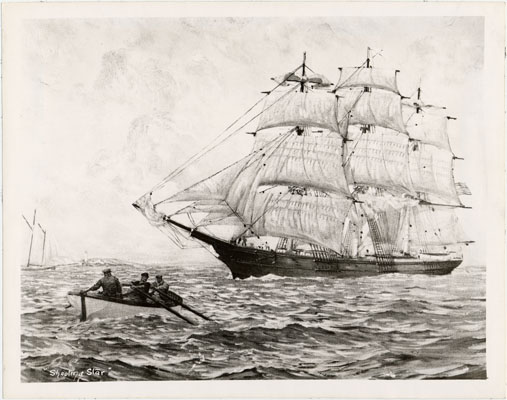

History

United States
- Name: Shooting Star
- Owner: Reed & Wade, Boston
- Builder: James. O. Curtis, Medford, MA
- Launched: 8 February 1851
- Fate: Sold to a merchant from Bangkok, Thailand, 1862 Wrecked off the coast of Formosa, 1867

General characteristics
- Class & type: Extreme clipper
- Tons burthen: 903 tons
- Length: 171 ft (52 m). LOA
- Beam: 35 ft (11 m)

Shooting Star was an extreme clipper built in 1851 near Boston, in Medford, Massachusetts. She was the first "real clipper" to be built in Medford, and sailed in the San Francisco, China, and Far East trades. According to Howe and Matthews, she was known as "one of the fastest of the small clippers".

== Construction ==
The frames were made of white oak, with planking of Southern pine. The ship was coppered and copper fastened.

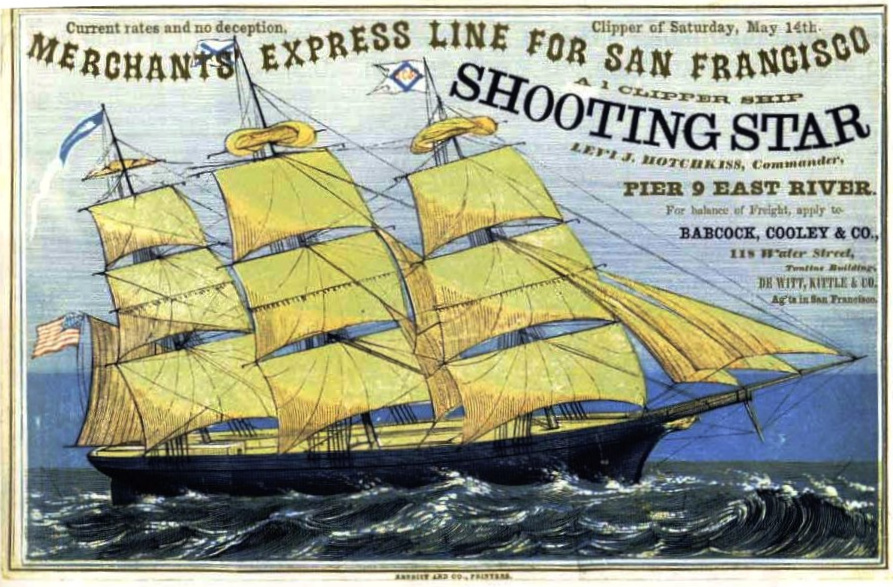
Clipper ship sailing card

== Voyages ==
Shooting Star was partially dismasted on its maiden voyage was from Boston to San Francisco, and had to put in at Rio for repairs, completing its voyage in 124 days. The second voyage from Boston to San Francisco was faster, with a time of 105 days.

Voyages in 1853 and 1855 from New York to San Francisco were completed in 123 and 116 days.

Shooting Star's most notable run was a homeward passage from Whampoa, China, in which she made a passage from Macao to Boston in 86 days.

After 1856, Shooting Star sailed in the Asia and China trade.

Shooting Star made a 264-day circumnavigation.

== Namesakes ==
- A second Shooting Star was built by Reed, Wade, and Co. in 1859. It was a 947-ton medium clipper. This ship was captured and burned by Chickamauga, a Confederate privateer, on Oct. 31, 1864, when it was on a voyage from New York to Panama.
- An extreme clipper built in 1851, the Ino, was renamed Shooting Star after its sale in 1867. It was later re-rigged as a bark.
- A 1518-ton Class A1 ship named Shooting Star was built in Quebec in 1853.
