= USS Ino =

Union Navy clipper ship

History

United States
- Name: USS Ino
- Owner: 1851: Sifkin & Ironside (New York); 1859: Goddard & Thompson (Boston); 1861: U.S. Navy; 1867: Samuel G. Reed & Co. (Boston); 1867: Rosenfeld & Birmingham (SF)
- Builder: Perrine, Patterson & Stack (NY)
- Launched: 4 Jan 1851
- Christened: Ino
- Acquired: (by Navy): 30 Aug 1861 for $40,000, by John M. Forbes & Co.
- Commissioned: 23 Sep 1861
- Decommissioned: 13 Feb 1867
- Renamed: USS Ino (1861); Shooting Star (1867); Ellen (by 1886)

Finland
- Renamed: Ellen
- Notes: Recorded in Barcelona as Finnish barque Ellen of Vasa, under Captain Dahlstrom, in 1886

General characteristics
- Class & type: Extreme clipper
- Tonnage: 895 tons OM, 673 tons NM
- Length: 160 ft 6 in (48.92 m)
- Beam: 34 ft 11 in (10.64 m)
- Draught: 17 ft 5 in (5.31 m)
- Sail plan: Full-rigged ship, 9491 1/3 square yards of sail area; converted to barque, sometime after 1867
- Speed: 14 knots
- Complement: 144
- Armament: Eight 32-pounder guns

USS Ino was a clipper ship acquired by the Union Navy during the course of the American Civil War. She was capable of great speed and distance, and was a formidable warship with powerful guns.

Ino was a clipper ship, purchased at Boston, Massachusetts, 30 August 1861 and commissioned at the Boston Navy Yard 23 September, Lt. J. P. Cressy in command. Unusual speed and large storage space suited her ideally for long-range cruising against Confederate commerce raiders.

== Privateer Hunting ==
Her first duty began 27 September when she departed Boston, Massachusetts, in search of "rebel pirates." When word came that the South's famed cruiser CSS Sumter, under the brilliant master of seamanship, Captain Raphael Semmes, was in European waters, Ino sailed from Boston 5 February 1862 and reached Cadiz, Spain, only 13 days and 16 hours later. She assisted USS Kearsarge and USS Tuscarora to blockade Semmes at Gibraltar where he vainly sought repairs. Semmes finally abandoned Sumter there in order to get back into action. An interesting side light to this operation occurred at Tangier, Morocco in February, when Ino took possession of two Confederate agents arrested by the local US consul, later turning them over to the Boston-bound American merchant ship Harvest Home for transport to America. This incident sparked a minor diplomatic crisis known as the Tangier Difficulty.

== Stateside operations ==
Back in Boston, Ino was ordered to Port Royal, South Carolina, for duty in the South Atlantic Blockading Squadron 4 August 1862. On her voyage south she captured the French bark La Manche attempting to run the Charleston, South Carolina, blockade 23 August.

== Searching for Semmes again ==
Six days later she arrived at St. George, Bermuda, to obtain from the American consul the latest information on blockade running activity in that quarter. She got underway the next day at the behest of the neutrality-conscious governor of Bermuda and made Port Royal 7 September. Only 4 days later she set sail for New York to be prepared for a cruise in search of her old adversary, Semmes, who was now attacking northern merchantmen with his new raider, CSS Alabama. Ino departed New York 5 November and cruised in the lanes frequented by American merchantmen and whalers, arriving at St. Helena 5 January 1863. She remained in waters off St. Helena until setting course for the United States 1 March. She arrived New York 15 April for repairs.

Ino departed New York 29 May 1863 escorting California-bound clipper Aquilla carrying the disassembled parts of monitor Comanche. After successfully shepherding her charge to safe waters well below the equator, she searched for CSS Alabama and CSS Florida in waters ranging to the island of Fernando de Noronha, thence to New York, arriving 7 September 1863.

== Disguised as a merchantman in order to lure CSS Florida ==
After repairs at New York, Ino joined the North Atlantic Blockading Squadron. Disguised as a merchantman to lure CSS Florida into action, she cruised in the North Atlantic Ocean 24 October when she arrived Portland, Maine.

Ino was transferred to the East Gulf Blockading Squadron 22 November where she served until after the end of the war. She returned to New York 1 August 1865 and remained there under repairs until 16 October when she sailed to serve in the Mediterranean and off the coast of Portugal.

== Post-war decommissioning and sale ==
Ino set-course for the United States 13 December 1866 and arrived Boston 25 January 1867. She decommissioned there 13 February and was sold at public auction 19 March 1867 to Samuel G. Reed. After the sale, the ship was renamed Shooting Star (not to be confused with the Boston-built clipper of the same name).
