= Queenstown, Virginia =

Unincorporated community in Virginia, United States

- Unincorporated community
- Location in Virginia Location in the United States
- Coordinates: 37°40′50″N 76°29′15″W
- Country: United States
- State: Virginia
- County: Lancaster
- Time zone: UTC−5 (Eastern (EST))
  - Summer (DST): UTC−4 (EDT)

Queenstown is an unincorporated community in Lancaster County in the U.S. state of Virginia.
