= Medium clipper =

A medium clipper is a type of clipper designed for both cargo carrying capacity and speed. An evolutionary adaptation of the extreme clipper, the medium clipper had been invented by 1851, when the hull type appeared in U.S. shipyards. Medium clippers continued to be built until 1873, when Pilgrim, one of the last known medium clipper ships to be built, was launched by Joshua T. Foster from the shipyards of Medford, Massachusetts.

== Innovation ==
The 1850s saw two major gold rushes in the English-speaking world—in Australia and Nevada—as well as continued development of placer gold mining in the Sierra Nevada mountains of California.

As these precious metal mining activities matured, the working populations of the affected gold and silver mining belts began to demand large quantities of manufactured goods. Shippers began to look for a ship design that would speed large quantities of boxed, barrelled, or crated cargo to Melbourne or San Francisco.

At the beginning of the 1850s, the dominant U.S. fast sailing ship design was the extreme clipper, properly defined as a cargo vessel with a 40-inch-or-more dead rise at half floor. This refers to a sail-powered cargo hull with a relatively flat-floored rear half, tapering as one moves forward along the hull to a relatively sharp forward half.

Extreme clippers successfully served the 49ers who reached California placer fields during the opening years of the rush, but negative aspects of the design soon became apparent. The sharp-floored forward halves could not carry as much cargo as a full flat hull. In addition, the sharp-floored forward halves lacked the buoyancy of the rounded rear halves, and this asymmetrical buoyancy tended to strain and weaken the hull. The working lifespan of an extreme clipper ship tended to be short.

== Period of design ==
In the mid-1800s, shipbuilders in Medford, Massachusetts began building what would become the medium clipper ship. They “quietly evolved a new type (of ship) of about 450 tons burden which, handled by eighteen officers and men, would carry half as much freight as a British-Indianman of 1500 tons with a crew of 125, and sail half again as fast.” Most owners wanted ships that could do all kinds of work and the “finest type” then being built was the Medford or Merrimac East Indianman. An example would be the Columbiana, built in Medford in 1837, or Jotham Stetson's ship the Rajah, 531 tons, 140 feet long which was constructed in the previous year. As Admiral Morison points out, ships built in Medford by the firms of J.O. Curtis, Hayden & Cudworth, and S. Lapham "have more fast California passages to their credit, considering the number they built, than those of any other place".

In 1851, shipbuilders in Medford, Massachusetts built Antelope. Often called Antelope of Boston to distinguish it from other ships of the same name, this vessel is sometimes called one of the first medium clipper ships. A ship-design journalist noted that "the design of her model was to combine large stowage capacity with good sailing qualities." Antelope was relatively flat-floored and had only an 8-inch dead rise at half floor.

By 1852 U.S. shipbuilders such as Donald McKay & Co. had also begun to implement a new type of clipper ship hull, which combined a flat-floored hull for maximal cargo capacity with a clipper bow resembling that of the extreme clipper ship. The stern, masts, spars, and sail area also resembled the extreme clipper ship. The half floor dead rise of the true extreme clipper ship was, however, no longer to be seen.

Shippers responded positively to the new hull design and instructed shipbuilders accordingly. By 1854, the numbers of medium clippers on the stocks were far outpacing the remaining extreme clippers. The last true extreme clipper was built in 1855.

By the 1860s, the time of the medium clipper was also coming to an end. Construction of a network of coaling stations around the world was making it possible for ocean-going steamships to cover global trade routes with a speed, frequency, and reliability of service that no medium clipper ship could match.

In the 1860s a final generation of clipper ships, the clipper-built composite ship, featured wooden planking over a wrought iron frame; the strength of the iron frame protected the composite clipper from the hogging and sagging that had bedevilled its predecessor, the extreme clipper. The surviving clipper ships of the world as of 2016, such as Cutty Sark, are clipper-built composite ships; no true extreme clipper or medium clipper ships are known to survive.
