= James O. Curtis =

American shipbuilder

James Otis Curtis
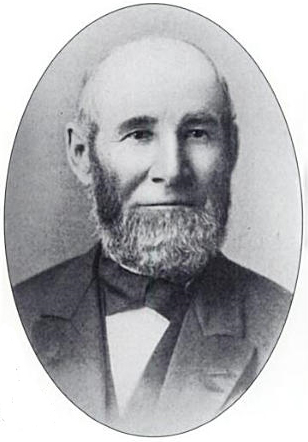
- Born: November 1, 1804; Scituate, Massachusetts
- Died: March 3, 1890 (aged 85); Medford, Massachusetts
- Occupation: Shipbuilder
- Parent(s): James Curtis & Desire Otis

James Otis Curtis (November 1, 1804 – March 3, 1890) was an American shipbuilder who built ships in Medford, Massachusetts (up the Mystic River from Boston). He built wooden ships that were either powered by sail or by screw and steam.

== Background ==
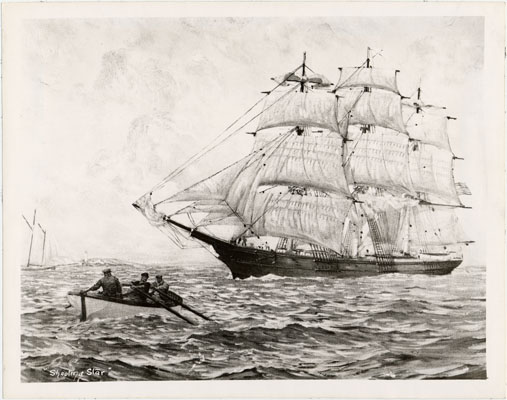
Shooting Star, extreme clipper built in Medford, Massachusetts, in 1851

Included in the vessels built by Curtis were at least 18 American Clipper Ships, including the first Clipper Ship built in Medford, the Shooting Star, and the largest ship and clipper ship ever built at Medford, the Ocean Express:
* 1851 Shooting Star, 903 tons Old Measurement (extreme clipper)
* 1851 Telegraph, 1078 tons Old Measurement (extreme clipper)
* 1851 Antelope of Boston, 587 tons Old Measurement (medium clipper)
* 1852 Onward, 874 tons Old Measurement (extreme clipper)
* 1852 Whirlwind, 960 tons Old Measurement (extreme clipper)
* 1852 Star Of The Union, 1057 tons Old Measurement (extreme clipper)
* 1853 George Peabody, 1397 tons Old Measurement (medium clipper)
* 1853 Competitor (renamed Lorelei), 871 tons Old Measurement (medium clipper)
* 1853 Wild Ranger, 1044 tons Old Measurement (medium clipper)
* 1853 Eagle Wing, 1174 tons Old Measurement (extreme clipper)
* 1854 Ocean Express, 1697 tons Old Measurement (medium clipper)
* 1854 Ocean Telegraph (renamed Light Brigade in 1863), 1495 tons Old Measurement (extreme clipper)
* 1855 Good Hope, 1295 tons Old Measurement (medium clipper)
* 1856 Silver Star, 1195 tons Old Measurement (medium clipper)
* 1856 Flying Mist, 1183 tons Old Measurement (medium clipper)
* 1856 Young Turk, 350 tons Old Measurement (medium clipper)
* 1857 Wild Gazelle, 490 tons Old Measurement (medium clipper barque)
* 1858 Industry, 1106 tons Old Measurement (medium clipper)

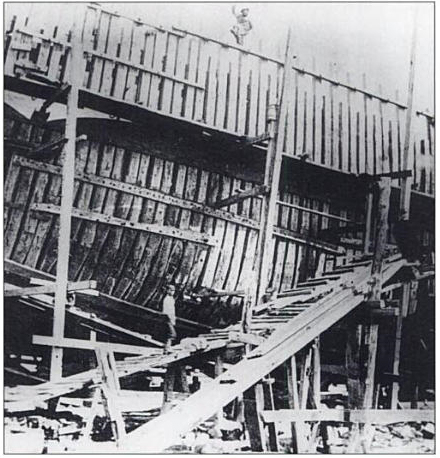
Shipbuilding in the Curtis Yard on Union Street

Shipbuilding was one of the two major businesses at Medford in the mid-19th century. Thatcher Magoun's shipyard, where Curtis did his apprenticeship, was the oldest and largest of the 10 yards, and remained so even after Thatcher's retirement in 1836. In 1845 one-quarter of all shipwrights in Massachusetts were employed in the Medford shipyards. The yards clustered along 1 mile of the Mystic River riverfront, and Curtis' yard was between Union and Swan Streets. The yards drew upon the ready supply of local timber until the local woods were depleted. Ships were then built from timber cut down and floated south from the hardwood forests of New Hampshire. Each ship was built from fifteen or more species of wood carefully pieced together where the special properties of each would do the most good.

Curtis was the first child and eldest son of James and Desire (Otis) Curtis. He was born on November 1, 1804, at Scituate, Massachusetts. In 1820, at the age of 15, he went to Medford to begin an apprenticeship as a shipwright at the shipyard of Mr. Thatcher Magoun. In 1834 the firm of Curtis and Co. was formed together with Paul Curtis. In the 5 years from 1834 to 1839 they were to build 9 vessels. In 1836 they took over the yard of Thatcher Magoun, to whom they had both been apprenticed, relinquishing the yard to others after their partnership dissolved in 1839. Carrying on business on his own, James Curtis then built another 78 vessels in the next 30 years until retiring from shipbuilding in 1869. Paul Curtis also continued building ships on his own at Medford until 1852, when he moved his shipyard to East Boston. Even though both James Curtis and the elder Paul Curtis shared a surname, and were both born in Scituate, they were not closely related and no link has been found between their families.

The last ship built in Medford, the Pilgrim, was launched in 1873. Just 4 years earlier Curtis had retired from shipbuilding after the launching of the last ship that he built in 1869, but he was still very much involved in his local community.

A civic-minded gentleman, Curtis took great interest in schools including acting as a school commissioner. In 1877 he donated to Medford its only school-bell (in the tower of the Curtis school that had been built in 1877 and named after him), that formerly did service in his shipyard where it rang at the opening and closing hours of daily labor. He also was involved in the Medford branch railroad, and served as a member of the Spot Pond water commission which supplied Medford's water. Curtis was to serve the town of Medford in many capacities. He was the moderator of town meetings for 3 years, a selectman for 7 years, an ardent temperance worker, an assessor for 2 years, and in 1836 for 1 year a representative to the Massachusetts General Court. He was a trustee of Tufts College (now Tufts University) from 1856, and had been president of the Monument National Bank of Charlestown from 1871.

Curtis' first wife Adeline Wait Curtis, whom he had married in 1826, had died in 1858, and they had two children: George in 1827 and Mary Genette in 1831.

Curtis died on Monday March 3, 1890, in the house which he built at the corner of Main and Royall Streets at Medford leaving a widow, his second wife, whom he had married in 1859.

== See also ==
- CSS Manassas

== Notes ==
- One reference states that the Ocean Telegraph was built by Hayden & Cudworth. This is not substantiated by any other references. This clipper ship was built by James O. Curtis.
- One reference states that the Phantom was built by James O. Curtis. This is not substantiated by any other references. This clipper ship was built by Paul Lapham.
