= USCS Meredith =

History

United States
- Name: Meredith
- Namesake: William M. Meredith (1799-1873), United States Secretary of the Treasury (1849-1850)
- Completed: 1851
- Commissioned: 1851
- Decommissioned: 1872

General characteristics
- Type: Schooner; survey ship
- Length: 63 ft (19 m)
- Beam: 18 ft (5.5 m)
- Draft: 5.5 ft (1.7 m)
- Propulsion: Sails
- Sail plan: Schooner-rigged

USCS Meredith was a schooner that served as a survey ship in the United States Coast Survey from 1851 to 1872.

Meredith was built in 1851 and entered service with the Coast Survey the same year. She operated along the United States East Coast during her career.

On the morning of 12 October 1856, Meredith was at anchor in Portland Harbor at Portland, Maine, when her crew spotted fishermen who were in danger of drowning when their boat was swamped while they were attempting to reach their fishing vessel. Meredith's sailing master, Mr. John T. Hopes, with one of the crew, promptly pulled out and rescued the fishermen.

Meredith was retired from Coast Survey service in 1872.
