= Antelope (1851 clipper) =

Clipper built in 1851

History

United States
- Name: Antelope
- Owner: William Lincoln and Co., Boston
- Builder: James. O. Curtis, Medford, MA
- Launched: November 1851
- Acquired: June 1855, sold to New York parties, 1858, owned by J. Morewood & Co., New York
- Fate: Lost on Discovery Shoal, Paracels Reef, China Sea, Lat 17 N Lon 112 E, en route from Bangkok to China; Abandoned 6 August 1858

General characteristics
- Type: Medium clipper
- Tons burthen: 587 tons
- Length: 140 ft (43 m). LOA
- Beam: 29 ft (8.8 m).
- Draft: 19 ft (5.8 m).
- Notes: 2 decks

Antelope was a medium clipper built in 1851 in Medford, near Boston, Massachusetts. She sailed in the San Francisco, China, and Far East trades, and was known for her fine finish work and for her crew's escape from pirates. She is sometimes referred to as "Antelope of Boston" to distinguish her from the extreme clipper Antelope launched in New York in 1852.

== Construction ==
Antelope was designed "to combine large stowage capacity with good sailing qualities." Her frame was white oak, with yellow pine planking and a rock maple keel.

Her ends are clipperly in their form, and her water-lines slightly concave; and, although she has only 8 inches dead rise at half floor, yet, as her stem is almost upright, her floor long, and her keel deep, she is expected to hold as good a wind as most of the sharp-bottomed clippers of the same register.

The hull was black, the inside dark buff with blue waterways. Her cabin was "beautifully panelled with satin and zebra woods, set off with rose wood pilasters." The "Boston Daily Atlas" praised Antelope’s ornamental work as "infinitely superior to most of the gaudy stuff now in vogue."

== Voyages ==
Antelope sailed from Boston to San Francisco on her maiden voyage in 149 days, rather than the expected 130 days or less, under the well known Captain Tully Crosby. From there she sailed to Shanghai, returning to New York with a passage of 118 days.

In 1853, Antelope arrived in San Francisco from New York under Captain Snow on August 31 after a passage of 128 days, returning to New York via Callao in 178 days.

After one more round trip to the West Coast of South America Antelope went into the China trade.

== Wreck, and piracy ==
In July 1858, Antelope departed Bangkok for China under Captain Clarke. On August 6, she struck on Discovery Shoal, Paracels Reef, which was not visible due to a high, ending her sailing career after six years and nine months.

Captain Clarke, four passengers, and 13 seamen abandoned ship, and set out in one of the ship's boats. A second boat, which became separated during the night, carried the mate, one seaman, and ten Chinese passengers. Four days later, a Chinese fishing junk came into view. Clarke offered the fishermen $20 for a tow to a place where water could be had. Once the Antelope party was taken in tow, it became evident that the fishermen were not trustworthy. Fearing piracy, the shipwrecked party cut the tow rope and attempted an escape. The fishermen pursued the boat, attacked it with stones, and finally set two fishermen to stand guard with spears while the others robbed the Antelope party. In the midst of the confusion, two of the Antelope sailors took advantage of the distraction and boarded the fishing junk, dispatching its crew. Captain Clarke also attempted to board the junk, but fell in the water and had to be rescued. The shipwrecked Antelope party then took command of the junk, and arrived in Hong Kong on August 14.
