= Extreme clipper =

Clipper ship designed to sacrifice cargo capacity for speed

An extreme clipper was a clipper designed to sacrifice cargo capacity for speed. They had a bow lengthened above the water, a drawing out and sharpening of the forward body, and the greatest breadth further aft. In the United States, extreme clippers were built in the period 1845 to 1855. British-built extreme clippers include vessels built over the period 1854 to 1870 (Annandale to e.g. Norman Court).

== The first extreme clipper ==
Arthur H. Clark, in his 1910 book The Clipper Ship Era, explains the history leading up to the construction of the first extreme clipper:

In 1841, John W. Griffeths, of New York proposed several improvements in marine architecture, which were embodied in the model of a clipper ship exhibited at the American Institute, in February of that year. Later he delivered a series of lectures on the science of ship-building which were the first discourses upon this subject in the United States. Griffeths advocated carrying the stem forward, in a curved line, thereby lengthening the bow above water; he also introduced long, hollow water-lines and a general drawing out and sharpening of the forward body, bringing the greatest breadth further aft. Another improvement which he proposed was to fine out the after body by rounding up the ends of the main transom, thus relieving the quarters and making the stern much lighter and handsomer above the water-line.

This proposed departure from old methods naturally met with much opposition, but in 1843, the firm of Howland & Aspinwall commissioned Smith & Dimon, of New York, in whose employ Griffeths had spent several years as draughtsman, to embody these experimental ideas in a ship of 750 tons, named the Rainbow. This vessel, the first extreme clipper ship ever built, was therefore, the direct result of Griffeths's efforts for improvement. Her bow with its concave waterlines and the greatest breadth at a point considerably further aft than had hitherto been regarded as practicable, was a radical departure, differing not merely in degree but in kind from any ship that preceded her. One critical observer declared that her bow had been turned "outside in," and that her whole form was contrary to the laws of nature. The Rainbow was designed and built with great care and was not launched until January, 1845.

== Medium and extreme clippers ==
From 1851 or earlier another type of clipper ship was also being built, the medium clipper. In the mid-1800s, shipbuilders in Medford, Massachusetts began building what would become the medium clipper ship. They "quietly evolved a new type (of ship) of about 450 tons burden which, handled by eighteen officers and men, would carry half as much freight as a British-Indianman of 1500 tons with a crew of 125, and sail half again as fast." Most owners wanted ships that could do all kinds of work and the "finest type" then being built was the Medford or Merrimac East Indiaman. An example would be the Columbiana built in Medford in 1837, or Jotham Stetson's ship the Rajah, 531 tons, 140 feet long which was constructed in the previous year. Ships built in Medford "have more fast California passages to their credit, considering the number they built, than those of any other place."

Two early examples of the medium clipper are the Antelope of Boston (1851): "The design of her model was to combine large stowage capacity with good sailing qualities"; and the Golden Fleece (1852): "In the form of her ends she is of the medium model." The medium clipper, though still very fast, had comparatively more allowance for cargo.

After 1854 extreme clippers were replaced in shipbuilding yards by medium clippers. A 1910 history of the clipper related: "...a fine class of ships, known as medium clippers, was constructed, some of which proved exceedingly fast, and remarkable passages continued to be made. Many of these medium clippers would be considered very sharp and heavily sparred vessels at the present time."

Extreme clippers remained in vogue only a few years. Owing to the depth and sharpness of their floors they lacked stability, and in consequence of the sharpness of the ends those parts did not have buoyancy enough to sustain their own weight—a fact which led to the straining and weakening of the vessel. A change was made in 1855 by joining to the clipper top, bow, and stern the fuller bottom of the old-fashioned freighting ship. The midship section, or widest part of the ship, was also moved farther aft, so as to be only a trifle forward of the middle of the ship's length, and the vessel was made to float substantially on an even keel. That style of vessel remains in use to the present day [1884], although capacity is now the chief aim in American sailing ships rather than speed.

== Alternative definition ==
Duncan McLean, the marine reporter who wrote at least 161 more or less detailed descriptions of ships launched in Boston and elsewhere in New England for the Boston Daily Atlas between April 1850 and March 1857, defined an extreme clipper as "clippers of 40 inches dead rise at half floor". By his definition extreme clippers ceased to be built after early 1852.

In the midst of the great clipper boom, in early 1851, he wrote "Nearly all the clipper ships which have been built recently, have had 40 inches dead rise at half floor." This was followed in late 1852 by his comment "It is therefore doubtful whether another clipper, having 40 inches dead rise, will be built."

Further understanding of what was happening in clipper ship construction at the time can be obtained from reading the whole section from which the last sentence above was obtained. "Our first large clippers had rounded lines and 40 inches dead rise at half floor; but now nearly all new clippers have hollow lines, and only 30 or 18 inches dead rise. The upright stem, too, has been modified into the inclined, and the length and sharpness of the ends have also been much varied."..."though very sharp and clipperly in the ends, has only 20 inches dead rise at half floor, experience having demonstrated, that great length with sharp ends do not require extreme sharpness of floor. Buoyancy is of more importance, and the speed obtained, especially running free, is more satisfactory. It is therefore doubtful whether another clipper, having 40 inches dead rise, will be built."

This narrower definition has not been accepted by history. The term "extreme clipper" was applied to the clipper ships built by Donald McKay during 1851 even though their dead rises were less than 40 inches. It has also been applied to clipper ships he built from 1852 to 1854, and to similar clipper ships built by other shipbuilders in the same period. It has been applied to clipper ships built with a lengthening of the bow above to water, a drawing out and sharpening of the forward body, and the greatest breadth further aft.

== See also ==
- Clipper route
- List of clipper ships
- Naval architecture
- Sail plan
