= Donald McKay House =

Historic house in Massachusetts, United States

- U.S. National Register of Historic Places
- U.S. Historic district – Contributing property
- Boston Landmark
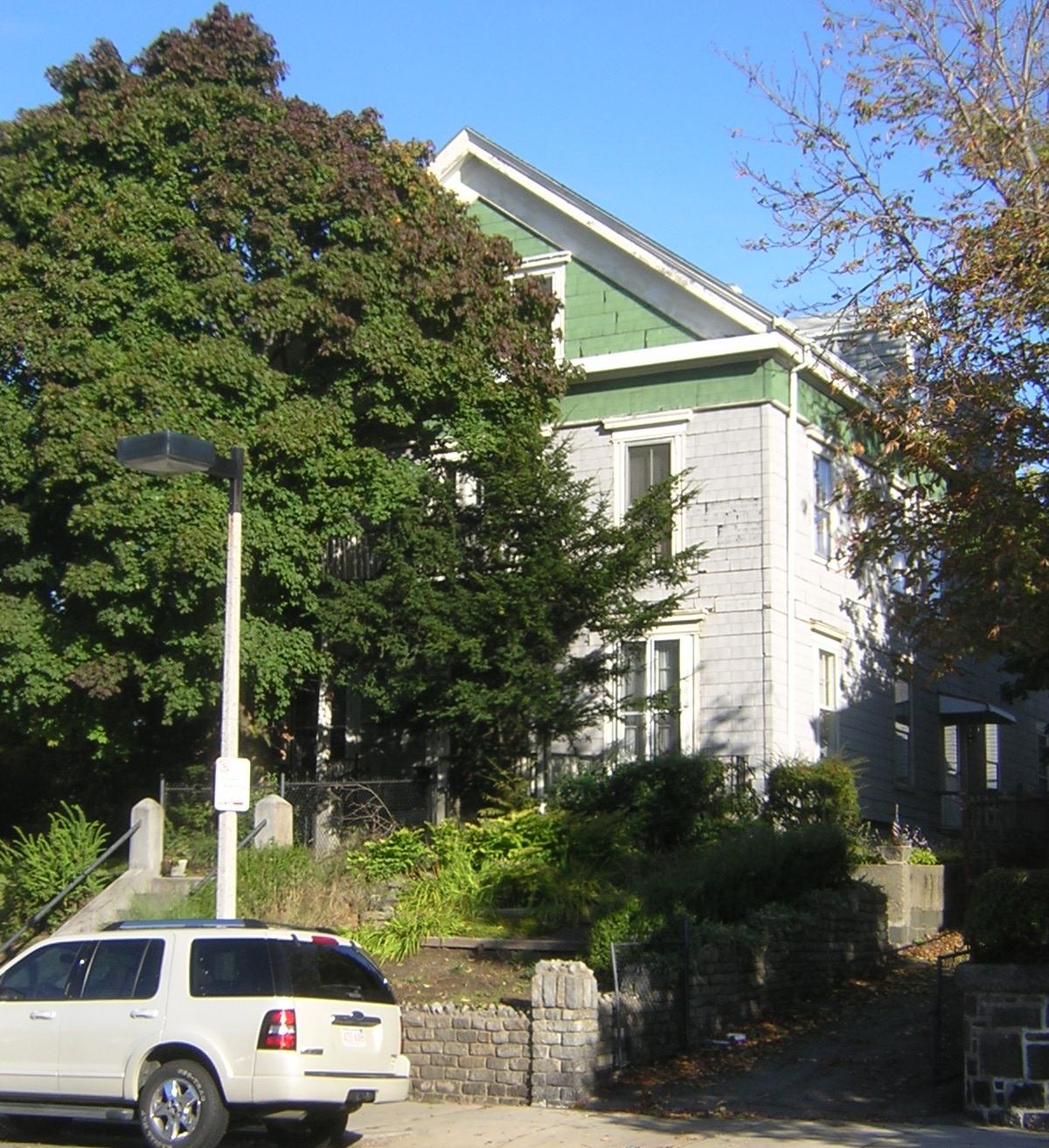
- Partial view of the McKay House facade.

- Location within Massachusetts
- Location: 78–80 White St. East Boston, Massachusetts
- Coordinates: 42°22′50.5″N 71°2′11.5″W
- Area: 0.3 acres (0.12 ha)
- Built: 1844
- Architectural style: Greek Revival
- Part of: Eagle Hill Historic District (ID98000149)
- NRHP reference No.: 82004450

Significant dates
- Added to NRHP: June 2, 1982
- Designated CP: February 26, 1998
- Designated BOSL: May 10, 1977

The Donald McKay House is a privately owned historic house at 78–80 White Street in East Boston, Massachusetts. It was the residence of Donald McKay, a builder of clipper ships.

== History ==
The house was built in 1844 in the Greek Revival architectural style, which is distinguished by its pitched roof and front-facing gable resembling a Greek pediment. Donald McKay (1810 – 1880) moved into the house in 1845, and during his residence there he designed and built some of the most successful clippers in history. These ships include the Flying Cloud (1851), which made two 89-day passages from New York to San Francisco; the Sovereign of the Seas (1852), which posted the fastest speed ever by a sailing ship (22 knots) in 1854; the Lightning (1854), which set multiple records, including sailing 436 miles in a 24-hour period and sailing from Melbourne, Australia, to Liverpool, England, in 64 days; and the James Baines (1854), which logged a speed of 21 knots on June 18, 1856.

While living in East Boston, McKay also built five large packet ships for Enoch Train's White Diamond Line, which specialized in the Atlantic emigrant route from Europe to North America, between 1845 and 1850. These ships were the Washington Irving, the Anglo Saxon, the Anglo American, the Daniel Webster, and the Ocean Monarch. The Ocean Monarch was lost to fire on August 28, 1848, soon after leaving Liverpool and within sight of Wales; over 170 of the passengers and crew perished. During the American Civil War, the U.S. Navy contracted McKay to build the USS Nausett, one of the few Casco-class monitors to be commissioned.

On January 25, 1977, a public hearing was held at Boston City Hall to consider designation. The house was designated as a Boston Landmark on May 10, 1977, it was also added to the National Register of Historic Places in 1982.

== See also ==
- National Register of Historic Places listings in northern Boston, Massachusetts
