= List of shipwrecks in August 1848 =

The list of shipwrecks in August 1848 includes ships sunk, foundered, wrecked, grounded, or otherwise lost during August 1848.

== 1 August ==
List of shipwrecks: 1 August 1848
Ship	State	Description
Gil Blas	United Kingdom	The ship ran aground on Scroby Sands, Norfolk. She was on a voyage from Newcastle upon Tyne, Northumberland to Naples, Kingdom of the Two Sicilies. She was refloated.
Helen	(United Kingdom of Great Britain and Ireland) British North America	The brigantine was wrecked on a reef off East Point, Prince Edward Island.
John Henry	(United Kingdom of Great Britain and Ireland) British North America	The ship was wrecked on the coast of Newfoundland.
Rising Sun	United States	The schooner was driven ashore at West Quoddy Head, Maine. She was on a voyage from Economy, Nova Scotia, British North America to Boston, Massachusetts. She was refloated and taken in to Lubec, Maine in a severely damaged condition.

== 2 August ==
List of shipwrecks: 2 August 1848
Ship	State	Description
Betsey	United Kingdom	The ship ran aground and was severely damaged at Cardiff, Glamorgan.
Carrara	United Kingdom	The ship ran aground on the Cross Sand, in the North Sea off the coast of Norfolk. She was on a voyage from Saint Petersburg, Russia to London. She was refloated and resumed her voyage.
Hope	United Kingdom	The ship was driven ashore at "Scotos", Ottoman Empire. She was on a voyage from Constantinople, Ottoman Empire to Cork or Falmouth, Cornwall.
Isabella	United Kingdom	The ship was driven ashore at Ballyferris Point, County Down. She was on a voyage from the Clyde to Newport, Monmouthshire. She was refloated and resumed her voyage.
Margaretha	United Kingdom	The ship ran aground on the Holm Sands, in the North Sea off the coast of Suffolk. She was on a voyage from Rouen, Seine-Inférieure, France to Newcastle upon Tyne, Northumberland. She was later refloated.
St. Mary	United Kingdom	The ship was wrecked on the Blowinghard Reef. Her crew were rescued. She was on a voyage from Jamaica to the Clyde.
Volusia	United Kingdom	The ship was wrecked in the Barburat Islands, British Honduras.

== 3 August ==
List of shipwrecks: 3 August 1848
Ship	State	Description
Harriet Stewart	United Kingdom	The ship ran aground off Skagen, Denmark. She was on a voyage from Liverpool, Lancashire to Narva, Russia. She was refloated and taken in to Helsingør, Denmark.

== 4 August ==
List of shipwrecks: 4 August 1848
Ship	State	Description
Admiral	United Kingdom	The ship was in collision with another vessel and was abandonedin the English Channel 120 nautical miles (220 km) south west of the Isle of Wight. She was on a voyage from London to Bordeaux, Gironde.

== 5 August ==
List of shipwrecks: 5 August 1848
Ship	State	Description
Mary	United Kingdom	The ship was in collision with a schooner and sank off Cromer, Norfolk. Her crew were rescued.
Two Brothers	United Kingdom	The ship ran aground on the North Sand, in the North Sea off the coast of Essex. She was refloated and resumed her voyage from North Shields, County Durham to London.
Welcome	United Kingdom	The ship ran aground on the Mouse Sand, in the North Sea off the coast of Essex. She was refloated and resumed her voyage from South Shields, County Durham to London.

== 6 August ==
List of shipwrecks: 6 August 1848
Ship	State	Description
Breeze	(United Kingdom of Great Britain and Ireland) New Zealand	The schooner was wrecked at the mouth of the Manawata River.
Georgina	United Kingdom	The ship was driven ashore at Gibraltar. She was on a voyage from Palermo, Sicily to Cork. She was later refloated and resumed her voyage.
Herald	United Kingdom	The ship was driven ashore at Gibraltar. She was on a voyage from Livorno, Grand Duchy of Tuscany to Cork. She was later refloated and resumed her voyage.
Love	United Kingdom	The ship ran aground on the Bognor Rock, in the English Channel off the coast of Sussex. She was on a voyage from Harwich, Essex to Plymouth, Devon. She was refloated and taken in to Littlehampton, Sussex in a leaky condition.
Q. E. D.	United Kingdom	The ship was driven ashore at Gibraltar. She was on a voyage from Naples, Kingdom of the Two Sicilies to London. She was later refloated and resumed her voyage.
Septima	United Kingdom	The ship was driven ashore at Gibraltar. She was on a voyage from Alexandria, Egypt to London. Her cargo of flax got wet and caught fire on 11 August and she was burnt out.
St. George	United Kingdom	The ship ran aground off Formby, Lancashire and capsized. Her crew were rescued. She was on a voyage from Dutton, Cheshire to Liverpool, Lancashire. She was refloated on 16 August and taken in to Liverpool.
Victory	United Kingdom	The ship was driven ashore on Gotland, Sweden. She was on a voyage from Saint Petersburg, Russia to London. She was refloated and resumed her voyage.

== 7 August ==
List of shipwrecks: 7 August 1848
Ship	State	Description
Bosphorus	United Kingdom	The ship was driven ashore at Santa Maria. She was on a voyage from Alexandria, Egypt to Falmouth, Cornwall. She was refloated and resumed her voyage.
Galway Packet	United Kingdom	The ship ran aground and sank on the Horn Reef. Her crew were rescued. She was on a voyage from Newport, Monmouthshire to Saint Petersburg, Russia.
Jenny	United Kingdom	The steamship was destroyed by fire and sank in the Ems. Her crew were rescued.
Olive Branch	United Kingdom	The ship struck a sunken rock in the Sound of Mull and was damaged. She put in to Stornoway, Isle of Lewis, Outer Hebrides in a leaky condition. She was on a voyage from Liverpool, Lancashire to Danzig.

== 8 August ==
List of shipwrecks: 8 August 1848
Ship	State	Description
Cleden	United Kingdom	The ship ran aground off Yarmouth, Isle of Wight. She was on a voyage from London to Dublin. She was refloated and taken in to Yarmouth.
Ianthe	United States	The ship was driven ashore at Saint Andrews, New Brunswick, British North America. She was refloated and towed in to Cumming's Cove in a damaged condition.
Twee Anthony's	Netherlands	The ship ran aground on the Scheelhoek. She was on a voyage from Hellevoetsluis, Zeeland to Batavia, Netherlands East Indies.

== 9 August ==
List of shipwrecks: 9 August 1848
Ship	State	Description
Hermann Louis	Bremen	The ship was driven ashore near Geestemünde. She was refloated and taken in to Bremerhaven.
Kestrel	United Kingdom	The ship ran aground on the Casas Reef, off the coast of Florida, United States. She was on a voyage from New Orleans, Louisiana, United States to Liverpool, Lancashire. She was refloated and taken in to Key West, Florida in a severely damaged condition. She was consequently condemned.
Louise	United Kingdom	The barque ran aground off Ottendorf, Duchy of Schleswig. She was on a voyage from London to Memel, Prussia. She was refloated and taken in to Hamburg.
Lynx	United Kingdom	The ship ran aground and was wrecked north of Cuxhaven. Her crew were rescued. She was on a voyage from Cuxhaven to Liverpool, Lancashire.
Margaret	(United Kingdom of Great Britain and Ireland) British North America	The ship was abandoned in the North Sea off Cuxhaven. Her crew were rescued. She was on a voyage from Cuxhaven to Saint John, New Brunswick.
Mercator	Norway	The ship was lost near Carolinensiel, Kingdom of Hanover.
Oscar	United Kingdom	The ship was driven ashore in the Weser near Sandstedt. She was on a voyage from Brake, Kingdom of Hanover to London. She was refloated on 15 August.
Zion	United Kingdom	The ship ran aground on Scharhörn. She was on a voyage from Hamburg to Hartlepool, County Durham. She was refloated and taken in to Hamburg in a leaky condition.

== 10 August ==
List of shipwrecks: 10 August 1848
Ship	State	Description
Capricorn	United Kingdom	The ship was wrecked on the Hogsty Reef, off Nassau, Bahamas. She was on a voyage from Jamaica to London.
Hopewell	United Kingdom	The sloop capsized and sank in the River Dee. She was refloated on 24 August and taken in to Flint, Flintshire.
Polly	United Kingdom	The brig, master William Baag, was wrecked on Hogland, Russia. Her crew were rescued. She was on a voyage from North Shields, County Durham to Kronstadt, Russia.
Samuel	United Kingdom	The ship ran aground on the Nehrung, off Pillau, Prussia. She was on a voyage from London to Königsberg, Prussia. She was refloated on 18 August and taken in to Pillau.
Tweed	United Kingdom	The brig was driven ashore at Stockvik, Sweden. She had been refloated and had resumed her voyage by 16 August.

== 11 August ==
List of shipwrecks: 11 August 1848
Ship	State	Description
Charlotte	(United Kingdom of Great Britain and Ireland) Van Diemen's Land	The schooner was driven ashore and wrecked. Her crew were rescued. She was on a voyage from Port Phillip, South Australia to the River Don.
Elspeth	United Kingdom	The ship was discovered derelict in the North Sea. She was towed in to Cuxhaven.
Haddock	(United Kingdom of Great Britain and Ireland) British North America	The schooner capsized off Saint-Augustin, Province of Canada. She was towed in to "Cul-de-Sac" the next day.

== 12 August ==
List of shipwrecks: 12 August 1848
Ship	State	Description
Fisher	United Kingdom	The ship was driven ashore at Hela, Prussia. She was on a voyage from Leith, Lothian to Danzig. She was refloated.
Gazelle	United States	The ship was driven ashore near Berlin, New Jersey. She was on a voyage from Barbados to New York.
Haddock	(United Kingdom of Great Britain and Ireland) British North America	The schooner capsized in a squall off Saint-Augustin, Province of Canada.
Tennasserim	France	The barque was driven ashore 15 nautical miles (28 km) west of Port Phillip, South Australia. She was on a voyage from Mauritius to Melbourne, New South Wales. She was refloated on 15 August and resumed her voyage.

== 13 August ==
List of shipwrecks: 13 August 1848
Ship	State	Description
Hebe	United Kingdom	The ship was wrecked on the Gunfleet Sand, in the North Sea off the coast of Essex.

== 14 August ==
List of shipwrecks: 14 August 1848
Ship	State	Description
Ann	United Kingdom	The ship foundered 7 nautical miles (13 km) off the Bass Rock, in the Firth of Forth. Her crew were rescued.
Progress	United Kingdom	The smack departed from the Clyde for Runcorn, Cheshire. No further trace, presumed foundered with the loss of all hands.
Sea Drift	United Kingdom	The ship sank off Rothesay, Isle of Bute.
Tenasserim	France	The ship was driven ashore 15 nautical miles (28 km) west of Port Phillip, South Australia. She was on a voyage from Mauritius to Melbourne, New South Wales. She was refloated on 16 August and completed her voyage.
Undine	United Kingdom	The ship ran aground on the Nash Sands, in the Bristol Channel off the coast of Glamorgan. She was on a voyage from Whitehaven, Cumberland to Cardiff, Glamorgan. She was refloated and taken in to Swansea, Glamorgan, where she sank.

== 15 August ==
List of shipwrecks: 15 August 1848
Ship	State	Description
Exchange	United Kingdom	The ship ran aground on the Newcombe Sand, in the North Sea off the coast of Suffolk. She was refloated and beached at Kirtley, Suffolk, where she capsized and sank. She was on a voyage from Seaham, County Durham to Whitstable, Kent.
Galena	United Kingdom	The ship ran aground on the Sheringham Shoal, in the North Sea off the coast of Norfolk and sank. Her crew were rescued. She was on a voyage from Seaham to London.

== 16 August ==
List of shipwrecks: 16 August 1848
Ship	State	Description
Adelaide	France	The schooner was wrecked near Saint-Malo, Ille-et-Vilaine. She was on a voyage from Sunderland, County Durham, United Kingdom to Saint-Malo.
Stowe	United Kingdom	The ship departed from Wells-next-the-Sea, Norfolk for Tongue, Sutherland. No further trace, presumed foundered with the loss of all hands.

== 17 August ==
List of shipwrecks: 17 August 1848
Ship	State	Description
Active	Denmark	The ship ran aground off Kingsdown, Kent. She was on a voyage from Saint Croix to Copenhagen.
Amethyst	United Kingdom	The schooner collided with the Bahamas Bank Lightship ( Trinity House) and foundered in the Irish Sea off St. Bees Head, Cumberland. Her crew were rescued. She was on a voyage from the Clyde to Liverpool, Lancashire.
Favourite	United Kingdom	The schooner ran aground on the Aqua Vitæe Rocks. She was on a voyage from Liverpool, Nova Scotia, British North America to Salem, Massachusetts, United States. She was refloated and resumed her voyage.
Frau Maria Antoinetta	Belgium	The schooner was driven ashore and wrecked at San Pier d'Arena, Grand Duchy of Tuscany. Her crew were rescued.
Horatio	United Kingdom	The ship foundered off Lambay Island, County Dublin. Her crew were rescued.
Kandiana	United Kingdom	The ship was wrecked in the Hooghly River at Calcutta, India. She was on a voyage from Newcastle upon Tyne, Northumberland to Calcutta.
Scotswood	United Kingdom	The ship ran aground near the Crosby Lightship ( Trinity House ). She was on a voyage from Liverpool to Genoa, Kingdom of Sardinia. She was refloated and put back to Liverpool in a leaky condition.
Union	United Kingdom	The ship was driven ashore at Rock Ferry, Cheshire. She was on a voyage from Liverpool to Santa Martha. She was refloated and anchored in the River Mersey.

== 18 August ==
List of shipwrecks: September 1848
Ship	State	Description
Æolus	United Kingdom	The ship was in collision with a brig and foundered off Rockcliffe. Her crew were rescued.
James Dowell	United Kingdom	The schooner was driven ashore 3 nautical miles (5.6 km) west of Fraserburgh, Aberdeenshire. She was on a voyage from Inverness to South Shields, County Durham. She was refloated on 20 August and taken in to Frazerburgh.
Rowena	(United Kingdom of Great Britain and Ireland) Jersey	The schooner was wrecked on the Hartwell Reef, in the Atlantic Ocean off Boa Vista, Cape Verde Islands, Her crew were rescued. She was on a voyage from Jersey to Rio de Janeiro, Brazil.
Royal Oak	United Kingdom	The ship was driven ashore and wrecked in the Copeland Islands, County Down. She was on a voyage from Maryport, Cumberland to Belfast, County Antrim.
Venus	United Kingdom	The ship was lost in Dundrum Bay. Her crew were rescued.

== 19 August ==
List of shipwrecks: August 1848
Ship	State	Description
Aim	United Kingdom	The schooner was driven ashore and severely damaged in the Orkney Islands.
Bangor Castle	United Kingdom	The ship was driven ashore near Ardrossan, Ayrshire. Her crew were rescued.
Belle Isle	(United Kingdom of Great Britain and Ireland) British North America	The ship capsized off Mount Desert, Maine, United States and was abandoned by her crew. She was on a voyage from Annapolis Royal, Nova Scotia to Boston, Massachusetts, United States. Belle Isle was subsequently towed in to Gloucester, Massachusetts on 25 August by Z. A. (United States).
Glasgow	United Kingdom	The ship was abandoned in the Atlantic Ocean. Her crew were rescued by Fadmore (United Kingdom). Glasgow was on a voyage from Liverpool, Lancashire to Boston, Massachusetts.
Isabella	United Kingdom	The ship struck a rock in the Sound of Laing and was damaged. She put in to Oban, Argyllshire. She was on a voyage from Newcastle upon Tyne, Northumberland to Dublin.
Jessie	United Kingdom	The ship struck a sunken rock in the Sound of Kerrara. She put in to Oban. She was on a voyage from Castlehill, County Mayo to Chester, Cheshire.
Myrmidon	United Kingdom	The steamship ran aground at St. Margaret's Hope, Orkney Islands. She was refloated.
Venus	United Kingdom	The schooner was driven ashore and wrecked between Dundrum and Newcastle, County Down. Her crew were rescued.
124 fishing boats	Netherlands, and United Kingdom	Moray Firth fishing disaster: A total of 124 fishing boats foundered in the Moray Firth with the loss of 100 lives.

== 20 August ==
List of shipwrecks: 20 August 1848
Ship	State	Description
Active	United Kingdom	The schooner was driven ashore at Bear's Head Point, Devon. She was refloated.
Alexander	(United Kingdom of Great Britain and Ireland) British North America	The ship was wrecked near "Marie-Joseph". She was on a voyage from Sydney, Nova Scotia to Halifax, Nova Scotia.
Argus	(United Kingdom of Great Britain and Ireland) Jersey	The ship collided with Susan (United States) in the Atlantic Ocean. She was abandoned the next day and her crew were rescued by Susan. Argus was on a voyage from Cádiz, Spain to Gaspé, Province of Canada, British North America.
Brothers	(United Kingdom of Great Britain and Ireland) British North America	The ship was wrecked at "Marie-Joseph". She was on a voyage from "Manadieu" to Halifax, Nova Scotia.
Elizabeth	United Kingdom	The sloop was driven ashore and wrecked at Battery Point, Devon.
George	United Kingdom	The sloop was driven ashore at Milford Haven, Pembrokeshire.
Gleaner	United Kingdom	The sloop was driven ashore and damaged at Battery Point. She was refloated.
Hope	United Kingdom	The ship was driven ashore and sank at Milford Haven. She was on a voyage from Milford Haven to Irvine, Ayrshire.

== 21 August ==
List of shipwrecks: 21 August 1848
Ship	State	Description
Brilliant	United Kingdom	The ship ran aground in Deadman's Bay. She was on a voyage from South Shields, County Durham to the Cape of Good Hope. She was refloated and taken in to Plymouth, Devon in a leaky condition.
Castor	France	The ship was driven ashore and wrecked on Guadeloupe.
Osprey	United Kingdom	The schooner capsized in a squall at New York, United States.
Sarah Ellen	United Kingdom	The ship ran aground and was damaged on the Sheringham Shoal, in the North Sea off the coast of Norfolk. She was refloated.
Witch	United Kingdom	The barque struck a sunken rock off the Shiant Isles, Outer Hebrides and was damaged. She was towed in to Stornoway, Isle of Lewis in a waterlogged condition by the cutter Princess Royal (United Kingdom). Witch was on a voyage from Liverpool, Lancashire to Danzig.

== 22 August ==
List of shipwrecks: 22 August 1848
Ship	State	Description
Benjamin Green	United Kingdom	The barque was damaged in a hurricane at Saint Kitts.
Betsey	(United Kingdom of Great Britain and Ireland) Saint Kitts	The cutter was lost in a hurricane at Saint Kitts.
Cedar Hill	(United Kingdom of Great Britain and Ireland) Antigua	The sloop was driven ashore in a hurricane at Parnham, Antigua.
Chancellor	(United Kingdom of Great Britain and Ireland) Antigua	The sloop was sunk in a hurricane at Antigua.
Defence	United Kingdom	The ship was wrecked at "Penrhynder", Caernarfonshire. Her crew were rescued.
Eliza	United Kingdom	The sloop was driven out to sea from Antigua in a hurricane. No further trace of the ship or her seve crew.
Euphane	United Kingdom	The brig was driven ashore and wrecked at Scheveningen, South Holland, Netherlands with the loss of two of her five crew. She was on a voyage from Sunderland, County Durham to Rotterdam, South Holland.
Falconer	United Kingdom	The ship foundered in the North Sea 40 nautical miles (74 km) off Cromer, Norfolk. Her crew were rescued by Victoria (United Kingdom). Falconer was on a voyage from Sunderland to London.
Maria	(United Kingdom of Great Britain and Ireland) Antigua	The sloop was driven ashore in a hurricane at Saint Kitts.
Mary	(United Kingdom of Great Britain and Ireland) Tortola	The schooner foundered in a hurricane at Saint Kitts with the loss of all hands.
Mary Frances	(United Kingdom of Great Britain and Ireland) Antigua	The sloop was driven ashore in a hurricane at Antigua.
Neptune	(United Kingdom of Great Britain and Ireland) Antigua	The sloop was driven ashore in a hurricane at Parnham, Antigua.
New Recovery	United Kingdom	The ship was driven ashore near Egmond aan Zee, North Holland, Netherlands. Her crew were rescued. She was on a voyage from Antwerp, Belgium to Leith, Lothian.
Ocean Bride	(United Kingdom of Great Britain and Ireland) Antigua	The sloop was wrecked in a hurricane at Antigua.
Only Son	(United Kingdom of Great Britain and Ireland) Saint Kitts	The sloop-boat was driven ashore and wrecked in a hurricane at Saint Kitts with the loss of all hands.
Paquet de Charleston	France	The ship was driven ashore and wrecked at Green Quay, Saint Thomas, Virgin Islands. She was on a voyage from Bordeaux, Gironde to Martinique and Saint Thomas.
Phoenix	(United Kingdom of Great Britain and Ireland) Saint Kitts	The sloop foundered in a hurricane off Saint Kitts with the loss of three of her crew.
Rosebud	(United Kingdom of Great Britain and Ireland) Saint Kitts	The sloop-boat sank in a hurricane at Saint Kitts with the loss of all hands.
Sally	United Kingdom	The ship foundered in the North Sea 40 nautical miles (74 km) off Cromer. Her crew were rescued by Victoria (United Kingdom). Sally was on a voyage form South Shields, County Durham to London.
Sarah Malone	(United Kingdom of Great Britain and Ireland) Antigua	The sloop was sunk in a hurricane at Falmouth, Antigua.
Therese	(United Kingdom of Great Britain and Ireland) Barbados	The schooner was driven ashore in a hurricane at English Harbour, Antigua. She was later refloated.
Wave	(United Kingdom of Great Britain and Ireland) Antigua	The sloop was driven ashore in a hurricane at Antigua.

== 23 August ==
List of shipwrecks: 23 August 1848
Ship	State	Description
Elizabeth	United Kingdom	The ship sprang a leak and sank off the Bell Rock. Her crew were rescued. She was on a voyage from Danzig to Leith, Lothian.
Elizabeth and Mary	United Kingdom	The ship ran aground and sank on the Luksand, off Amrum, Duchy of Holstein. Her crew were rescued. She was on a voyage from Aberdeen to Hamburg.
Herald	United Kingdom	The ship was driven ashore and wrecked near Ringkøbing, Denmark. She was on a voyage from Brixham, Devon to Saint Petersburg, Russia.
Mary Louisa	United Kingdom	The ship was wrecked in the Karimata Strait. She was on a voyage from Singapore to London.
Orion, or Union	United Kingdom	The ship ran aground on the Whitby Rock. She was on a voyage from Hartlepool, County Durham to London. She was refloated and resumed her voyage.
Thomas Battersby	United Kingdom	The ship ran aground in the Paraíba do Norte River. She was refloated and put back to "Varadoura", Brazil for repairs.

== 24 August ==
List of shipwrecks: 24 August 1848
Ship	State	Description
Dove	United Kingdom	The ship was driven ashore near Tetney Haven, Lincolnshire. She was on a voyage from Leeds, Yorkshire to Spalding, Lincolnshire.
Linnet	(United Kingdom of Great Britain and Ireland) British North America	The ship struck the Brig Rock and sank. Her crew were rescued.
Najaden	Sweden	The ship was driven ashore and severely damaged at Grønhøj, Denmark. Her crew survived. She was on a voyage from Christianstadt to Hull, Yorkshire, United Kingdom.
Venture	United Kingdom	The brig ran aground and was wrecked at Tampico, Mexico.

== 25 August ==
List of shipwrecks: 25 August 1848
Ship	State	Description
Ocean Monarch	United States	Queen of the Ocean, Ocean Monarch and Affonso. The barque caught fire in the Irish Sea off Great Orme Head, Carnarvonshire, United Kingdom and sank with the loss of 178 of the 398 people on board. Survivors were rescued by Affonso (Imperial Brazilian Navy), New World (United States), Prince of Wales and Queen of the Ocean (both United Kingdom). Ocean Monarch was on a voyage from Liverpool, Lancashire, United Kingdom to Boston, Massachusetts.
Orienten	(Russian Empire) Grand Duchy of Finland	The ship ran agrount on the Goodwin Sands, Kent, United Kingdom. She was on a voyage from Cádiz, Spain to Helsinki.
Teutonia	Kingdom of Hanover	The ship was run ashore and wrecked at Porthcurno, Cornwall, United Kingdom. Her crew were rescued. She was on a voyage from Dornumersiel to Newport, Monmouthshire, United Kingdom.

== 26 August ==
List of shipwrecks: 26 August 1848
Ship	State	Description
Commerce	United Kingdom	The ship was driven ashore and sank at Ballyquinton Point, County Down. Her crew were rescued. She was on a voyage from the Clyde to Saltney, Cheshire.
Jane and Agnes, and Prince of Wales	United Kingdom	The smack Jane and Agnes was in collision with the steamship Prince of Wales in the Irish Sea with the loss of seven lives on Prince of Wales. Both vessels were consequently beached at Point of Ayre, Isle of Man, where Jane and Agnes was wrecked. Jane and Agnes was on a voyage from Liverpool, Lancashire to Westport, County Mayo. Prince of Wales was on a voyage from Belfast, County Antrim to Fleetwood, Lancashire. Both vessels were later refloated and taken in to Ramsey Bay.
Prince Albert	United Kingdom	The flat was abandoned off Skerries, County Dublin. She was on a voyage from Liverpool, Lancashire to Dublin.
San Juan	United Kingdom	The ship was driven ashore at Rhosneigr, Anglesey, United Kingdom. She was on a voyage from Ribadeo to Liverpool. She was refloated on 2 September and taken in to Holyhead, Anglesey.
Waterwitch	(United Kingdom of Great Britain and Ireland) Jersey	The ship ran aground and was wrecked off Green Island, Newfoundland, British North America. She was on a voyage from Blanc-Sablon, Province of Canada, British North America to Zakynthos, Greece.
William Penn	United Kingdom	The ship was driven ashore and wrecked in Barlogue Bay, County Cork. Her crew were rescued. She was on a voyage from Saint John, New Brunswick, British North America to the Clyde.

== 27 August ==
List of shipwrecks: 27 August 1848
Ship	State	Description
Ann	United Kingdom	The ship ran aground on the Owers Sandbank, in the English Channel off the coast of Sussex. She was on a voyage from South Shields, County Durham to Southampton, Hampshire. She was refloated and resumed her voyage.
Cosmopolitan	United Kingdom	The ship was in collision with St. Lawrence (United Kingdom) and was abandoned in the Irish Sea 30 nautical miles (56 km) west of Holyhead, Anglesey with the loss of a crew member. She was on a voyage from Liverpool, Lancashire to Africa. Cosmopolitan was taken in to Kingstown, County Dublin in a derelict condition.
Policy	United Kingdom	The ship ran aground on Scroby Sands, Norfolk. She was on a voyage from Hull, Yorkshire to Constantinople, Ottoman Empire. She was refloated.
St. Vincent	United Kingdom	The ship was driven ashore and wrecked in Grenville Bay, Grenada.
Victoria	United Kingdom	The schooner was run ashore and wrecked on Sanday, Orkney Islands. Her crew were rescued. She was on a voyage from Liverpool to the Shetland Islands.
Zaida	United Kingdom	The ship was departed from Matanzas, Cuba for Cowes, Isle of Wight. No further trace, presumed foundered with the loss of all hands.

== 28 August ==
List of shipwrecks: 28 August 1848
Ship	State	Description
Agnes and Mary	United Kingdom	The ship was wrecked on the Hoburg Shoal, in the Baltic Sea. She was on a voyage from Hartlepool, County Durham to Kronstadt, Russia.
Bridget	United Kingdom	The ship sprang a leak and foundered off Islay, Inner Hebrides. Her crew were rescued. She was on a voyage from Liverpool, Lancashire to Restigouche, New Brunswick, British North America.
Ellen	United Kingdom	The ship ran aground off Rønne, Denmark. She was on a voyage from Newhaven, Sussex to Memel, Prussia. She was refloated and taken in to Rønne.
Flower	United Kingdom	The yawl foundered off Mothecombe, Devon with the loss of all three crew.
Hazard	United Kingdom	The ship departed from Matanzas, Cuba for Falmouth, Cornwall. No further trace, presumed foundered with the loss of all hands.
John and Elizabeth	United Kingdom	The schooner was wrecked on the Cefn Sidn Sand, in Carmarthen Bay, Her crew were rescued.

== 29 August ==
List of shipwrecks: 29 August 1848
Ship	State	Description
Beehive	United Kingdom	The ship ran aground on the Heugh Rocks, on the coast of County Durham. She was on a voyage from Bo'ness, Lothian to the River Tees.
James	United Kingdom	The ship ran aground at Lavernock Point, Glamorgan. She was on a voyage from Cardiff, Glamorgan to Genoa, Kingdom of Sardinia. She was refloated and beached at Cardiff.

== 30 August ==
List of shipwrecks: 30 August 1848
Ship	State	Description
Acadia	United Kingdom	The ship departed from Bristol, Gloucestershire for a port in British North America. No further trace, presumed foundered with the loss of all hands.
Damon	(United Kingdom of Great Britain and Ireland) Jersey	The brigantine was wrecked on St. Peter's Island, Newfoundland, British North America. Her crew were rescued. She was on a voyage from Gaspé, Province of Canada, British North America to Jersey.
HMS Hound	Royal Navy	The Alert-class brig-sloop ran aground on the south coast of Grand Cayman, Cayman Islands. She was refloated and put in to Havana, Captaincy General of Cuba, where she arrived on 3 September.
Janet	United Kingdom	The smack foundered off the Isle of Arran with the loss of all hands.
Peru	United Kingdom	The ship was wrecked at L'Ardoise, Nova Scotia, British North America. Her crew were rescued. She was on a voyage from Sunderland, County Durham to Wallace, Nova Scotia.
Zeo Zelie	France	The ship was in collision with another vessel and sank. Her crew were rescued. She was on a voyage from Barfleur, Manche to Swansea, Glamorgan, United Kingdom.

== 31 August ==
List of shipwrecks: 31 August 1848
Ship	State	Description
Acadia	United Kingdom	The ship departed from Bristol, Gloucestershire to Quebec City, Province of Canada, British North America. No further trace, presumed foundered with the loss of all hands.
Arrow	United Kingdom	The brig was driven ashore in a typhoon at Cumsingmoon, China. Her crew were rescued by USS Plymouth (United States Navy).
Brigand	United Kingdom	The ship foundered in the Atlantic Ocean. Her crew were rescued. She was on a voyage from British Honduras to Cork.
Carl Johan	United Kingdom	The barque was driven ashore in a typhoon at Macau, China.
Charles Wirgman	United States	The brig was driven ashore and wrecked in a typhoon at Hong Kong.
Clio	United Kingdom	The barque was wrecked in a typhoon at Macau with the loss of her captain.
Eagle	United Kingdom	The ship was driven ashore in a typhoon at Cumsingmoon. She was later refloated and taken in to Cumsingmoon, where she was condemned.
Eclipse	United Kingdom	The whaler was driven ashore at Fraserburgh, Aberdeenshire. She was refloated.
Eliza Stewart	United Kingdom	The full-rigged ship was driven into by John Laird (United Kingdom) in a typhoon at Hong Kong. She was consequently driven into the brig Dos Hermanos (Spain) and was severely damaged.
Emily	United Kingdom	The barque was driven ashore in a typhoon at Cumsingmoon.
Enterprise	France	The whaler was driven ashore in a typhoon at Macau. She was refloated.
Fancy	United Kingdom	The ship ran aground on The Shingles, off the Isle of Wight. She was on a voyage from London to Dublin. She was refloated.
Genoveva	Portugal	The brig was driven ashore in a typhoon at Macau.
Helen Stewart	United Kingdom	The barque was driven ashore in a typhoon at Green Island, Hong Kong.
Hermes	United Kingdom	The barque was driven ashore in a typhoon at Hong Kong. She was refloated.
Isabella Robertson	United Kingdom	The ship was driven ashore and sank in a typhoon at Cumsingmoon. Five survivors were rescued by USS Plymouth (United States Navy).
Kein Heem	Netherlands	The ship was driven ashore and wrecked in a typhoon at Shek O, Hong Kong with the loss of all but three of her crew.
Mayflower	United Kingdom	The schooner was driven ashore in a typhoon at Macau.
Morgiana	United Kingdom	The ship ran aground on the Burbo Bank, in Liverpool Bay. She was on a voyage from Liverpool, Lancashire to South Shields, County Durham. She was refloated and resumed her voyage.
Raven	United Kingdom	The ship sank in a typhoon at Macau.
Sylph	United Kingdom	The ship was wrecked in a typhoon at Macau.
Sylph	United Kingdom	The ship was driven ashore in a typhoon at Cumsingmoon. She was later refloated and taken in to Cumsingmoon. She was later towed to Hong Kong by the steamship Corsair (United Kingdom).
Sylphide	Hamburg	The schooner was driven ashore in a typhoon at Macau. She was refloated.

== Unknown date ==
List of shipwrecks: Unknown date in August 1848
Ship	State	Description
Augusta	Denmark	The jacht was lost off Skagen before 4 August.
Ellergill	United Kingdom	The ship was driven ashore on Hogland, Russia. She was on a voyage from Hull, Yorkshire to Kronstadt, Russia. She was refloated and completed her voyage, arriving at Kronstadt on 30 August.
Inez	United Kingdom	The ship was wrecked at the mouth of the Benito River, Africa in mid-August. She was on a voyage from the Benito River to Liverpool, Lancashire.
James	Stralsund	The ship was abandoned in the Baltic Sea. She was on a voyage from Stralsund to Riga, Russia.
Justitia	United States	The ship was wrecked in the Currituck Inlet before 26 August. Her crew were rescued. She was on a voyage from Rio de Janeiro, Brazil to Baltimore, Maryland.
Leonide	France	The ship foundered in the Atlantic Ocean with the loss of three lives. Seven survivors were rescued by Restauraçao (Brazil),
Lord Bruce	United Kingdom	The ship was driven ashore at Cape Spartel, Morocco. She was on a voyage from Cardiff, Glamorgan to Genoa, Kingdom of Sardinia. She was refloated and completed her voyage, arriving on 26 August.
Maria	France	The ship ran aground and was damaged at Angra Paquena, Africa. She was refloated and taken in to Mauritius.
Marshall	United States	The ship foundered in the Atlantic Ocean before 3 August.
Oscar	United Kingdom	The ship departed from Wells-next-the-Sea, Norfolk for Trondheim, Norway. No further trace, presumed foundered with the loss of all hands.
Penelope	United Kingdom	The brig was driven ashore in the Gironde. She was on a voyage from Bordeaux, Gironde, France to an English port.
Rapid	United Kingdom	The ship foundered in the Baltic Sea off Gotland, Sweden before 21 August. Her crew survived. She was on a voyage from Cardiff to Kronstadt, Russia.
Singleton	United Kingdom	The schooner departed from Swansea, Glamorgan for Liverpool. No further trace, presumed foundered with the loss of all hands.
Studley	United Kingdom	The ship was driven ashore near Karlskrona, Sweden before 18 August. She was on a voyage from Riga to an English port. she was refloated and put in to Helsingør, Denmark.
Washington	Hamburg	The barque was wrecked on Crooked Island, Bahamas before 1 September. She was on a voyage from Jacmel, Haiti to Bremen.
Western Rover	United Kingdom	The ship was driven ashore at Peterhead, Aberdeenshire. Her crew were rescued.
William Crow	United Kingdom	The ship was driven ashore at South Foreland, Kent. She was on a voyage from Liverpool to Newcastle upon Tyne, Northumberland. She was refloated and resumed her voyage.
