= Enoch Train =

American businessman

Colonel Enoch Train
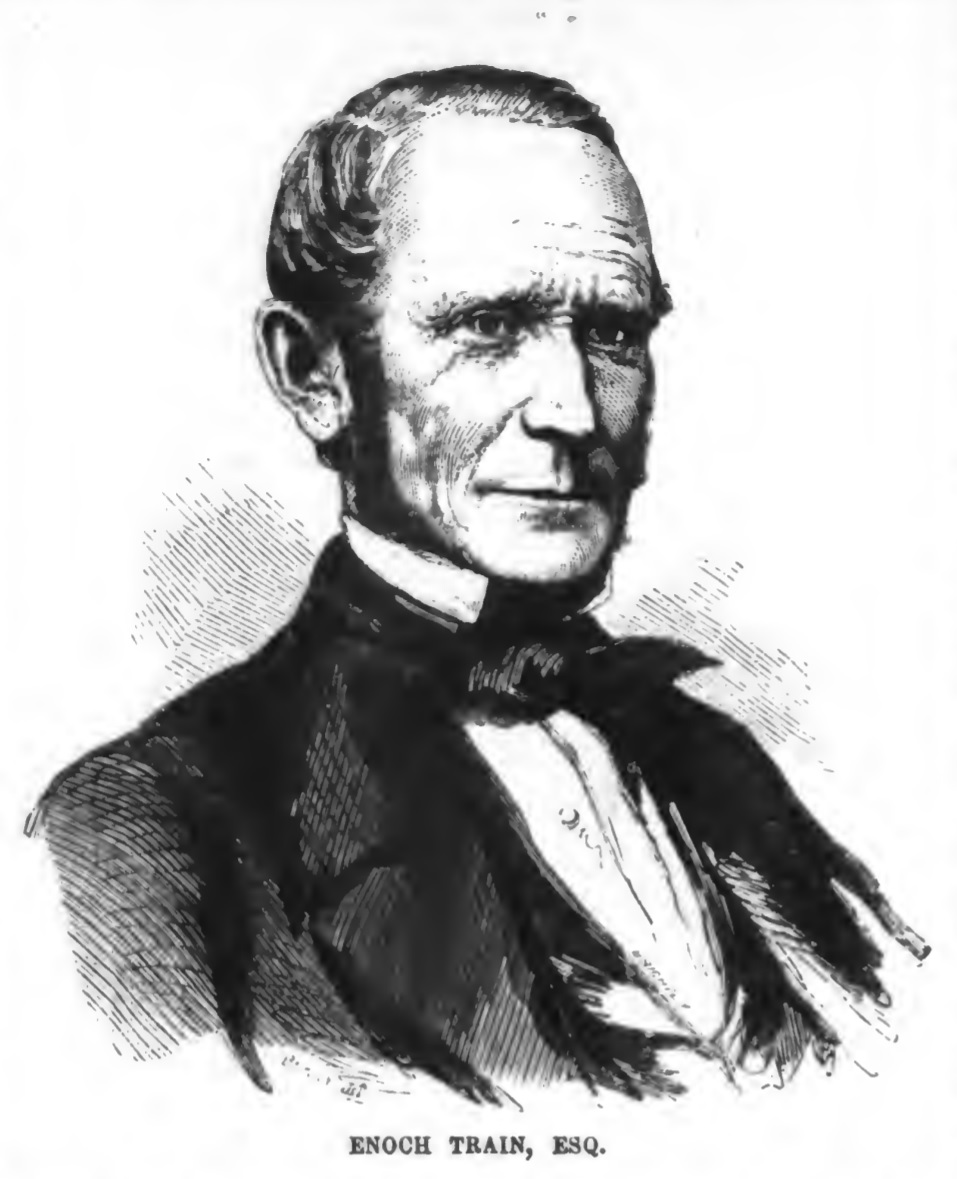
- c. 1855
- Born: May 2, 1801; Weston, Massachusetts, United States
- Died: September 3, 1868 (aged 67); Saugus, Massachusetts, United States
- Burial place: Cambridge, Massachusetts, United States
- Occupations: Shipowner and merchant
- Spouse(s): Adaline C. Dutton (married 1823–1834, until her death in 1834) and Almira Cheever (m.1834, until his death in 1868)
- Children: Adaline Dutton Train, Theodore Train, George N. Train, Caroline A. Train, Enoch Train
- Parents: Enoch Train (father); Hannah Ewing (mother)
- Relatives: George Francis Train

Enoch Train (1801–1868) was an American shipowner and merchant. He is known for establishing a successful packet service between Boston and Liverpool that later became known as the White Diamond Line. As detailed in the first full biography of Train, published in 2022, he also played a crucial role in the career of legendary shipbuilder, Donald McKay.

== Early life ==
Enoch Train was born on May 2, 1801, in Weston, Massachusetts^{1} to Enoch Train and Hannah Ewing Train, daughter of a Scotch chaplain in British army. He was the fourth of five children but only the second one living, because his oldest sister, Harriette, had died in her fourth year and his older brother, also named Enoch, had died in his second year.

After the death of his father, Enoch's mother married Captain Levi Bishop in 1807 and they moved to Halifax, Vermont to be closer to her parents. Around this time, Enoch and his two surviving sisters apparently went to live with their uncle, Ephraim Train (their late father's brother), in Hillsborough, New Hampshire. Their mother the died in 1814, leaving Train as an orphan at the age of 13. Train moved to Boston a couple of years later to learn the hide and leather business from his cousin Samuel Train, Ephraim's son. Samuel took Enoch into partnership soon after his twenty-first birthday in 1822. Enoch gradually expanded the small shipping operation his cousin had established and by the 1830s had taken over the business, with multiple vessels trading with Cape Verde, Europe and South America.

== Personal life ==
On November 3, 1823, Enoch Train married Adeline C. Dutton in Hillsborough, New Hampshire. By 1824 they were living in Boston where their first child, Adeline, was born on September 15. She was followed by four more children, Theodore (1826–1847), George (1828-1828), Caroline (1830–1908), and Enoch (1833–1854). Adeline died on August 25, 1834, at the age of 31.

Train married Almira Cheever in 1835. They had one boy who died shortly after his birth in 1838. Almira lived until 1881.

Train was an active member of the Whig Party and was elected to public office twice: first, to the Boston Common Council in 1840, and second, to the Massachusetts House of Representatives in 1848.

On January 23, 1855, Leon Lewis, a newspaper editor whom Train had once loaned money to, visited Train at his home in Dorchester. Lewis informed Train he was armed with a Bowie knife and a revolver and demanded money from him. Train was able to summon help from two servants who grabbed Lewis and after a violent struggle subdued him and tied him up with bed-cord until the police arrived.

Train spent his later years in his wife's hometown of Saugus, Massachusetts.

== Early years as a ship owner ==
By the time Enoch joined his firm, Samuel Train was already operating a small brig to trade with the Cape Verde islands for the raw hides and skins important for his leather-goods business. In the late 1820s, several years after he became a partner, Enoch added two more brigs to the shipping operation so that he could trade with Russia and other European countries. In 1834 Samuel retired from the firm, which then became known as Enoch Train & Co. Enoch made further upgrades to the firm's small fleet during the 1830s and early 1840s, replacing small brigs with larger ships, mostly built in shipyards on the Mystic River in nearby Medford, Massachusetts. During this period, he continued to trade with multiple European countries but switched to South America rather than Cape Verde as his source of skins and hides; his most notable ships were the Sterling, Forum, St. Petersburg, Governor Davis and Dorchester.

== White Diamond Line / Enoch Train & Co. / Train & Co. ==
In 1844 Enoch Train established what later became known as the White Diamond Line—although it was not called that during the period he owned it—to provide a packet service between Boston and Liverpool. Initially he redeployed some of the freighters he had previously been using for trade with Europe, but over time he replaced them with new ships built specifically for service as transatlantic packets. For the first several years of its existence he used agents to represent the line in England, but in 1850 he established a branch office in Liverpool, where it was known as Train & Co.

=== Enoch Train and Donald McKay ===
House flag of the White Diamond Line.

During a visit to England at the start of 1844 to make arrangements for his new packet line, Train chanced to meet a captain named Dennis Condry whose own ship, the Delia Walker, had been built in Newburyport, MA under the supervision of a young shipbuilder called Donald McKay. Condry had been highly impressed with McKay's work, and when he learned Train would soon be commissioning new ships for his packet line, he urged Train to meet with McKay before giving his business to any other builder. Upon his return to Boston, Train followed Condry's advice and sought out McKay, and according to Captain Clark, ″it was the swift contact of flint and steel″; less than an hour after the two men met, Train placed an order with McKay for a 620-ton packet ship, subsequently named the Joshua Bates. Train was so delighted with this ship when she was launched that he invited McKay to move to Boston and establish his own shipyard there, for which Train would provide the financial backing. Thus began a relationship that produced eleven ships between 1844 and 1853.

At the end of 1856 Train ceded control of his packet line to his two junior partners, Frederick W. Thayer and George Warren, and in February 1857 he declared insolvency. The demise of his business has sometimes been mistakenly attributed to the Panic of 1857, but that did not begin until six months later, in August of that year. After Thayer's retirement in 1862, the successor to Enoch Train's line was renamed the Warren Line.

=== Ships built by Donald McKay for Enoch Train ===
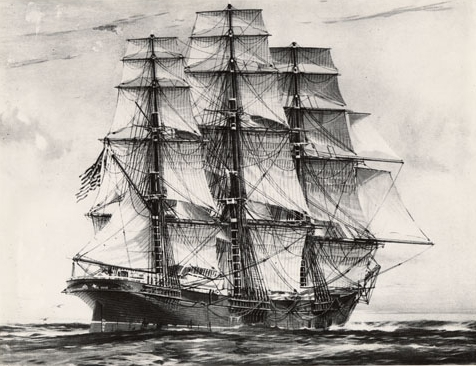
Sovereign of the Seas (1852)

Great Republic (1853)

| Date | Name | Size | Notes |
|---|---|---|---|
| 1844 | Joshua Bates | 620 tons | |
| 1845 | Washington Irving | 751 tons | Launched 15 September 1845. Sold to England in 1852 |
| 1846 | Anglo Saxon | 894 tons | Launched 5 September 1846. Lost off the coast of Nova Scotia in 1847. |
| 1847 | Ocean Monarch | 1,301 tons | Lost to fire off the coast of Wales, 1848. |
| 1848 | Anglo American | 704 tons | Built to replace Anglo Saxon |
| 1849 | Plymouth Rock | 960 tons | Owned by two of Train's captains, Upton and Caldwell. |
| 1850 | Daniel Webster | 1187 tons | |
| 1851 | Flying Cloud | 1782 tons | Clipper ship built for California Gold Rush. Sold by Train while still on stocks. Established new records for the voyage from New York to San Francisco that stood until 1989, when they were finally beaten by a modern racing yacht. |
| 1851 | Staffordshire | 1817 tons | Clipper ship. Wrecked off Cape Sable, December 29, 1853. Captain Richardson and 169 others lost their lives when the ship went down. She was valued at $120.000 at the time of the shipwreck. |
| 1853 | Star of Empire | 2050 tons OM | Identical to Chariot of Fame - the only two ships McKay ever built that were identical. In 1857, laden with guano, she broke into pieces on Currituck Beach, N. C. |
| 1853 | Chariot of Fame | 2050 tons OM | Identical to Star of Empire - the only two ships McKay ever built that were identical. Sold in 1862 and came to her end in January, 1876, being abandoned or lost at sea en route from Chincha Islands to Cork. |

=== Other Ships owned Enoch Train & Co. ===
| Date | Name | Size | Notes |
|---|---|---|---|
| 1832-43 | Sterling | 369 tons | |
| 1833-43 | Forum | 294 tons | |
| 1839-49 | St. Petersburg | 814 tons | Built by Waterman & Ewell of Medford |
| 1840 | Elijah N. Train | 644 tons | Lost at sea on maiden voyage |
| 1841-50 | Governor Davis | 731 tons | |
| 1842-44 | Dorchester | 415 tons | Lost at sea in December 1844 |

== Boston & European Steamship Company ==
Enoch Train saw the future of steam-powered ships and in 1855, along with James Bebee, Andrew Hall, Donald McKay, and George Upton, formed the Boston & European Steamship Company, ″for the purpose of navigating the ocean by steam″ . The venture never came to fruition, however, because it was unable to raise the substantial capital required to build its steamships,

== Notes ==
1. Some sources incorrectly give Train's place of birth as Hillsborough, New Hampshire. Enoch and his two sisters appear to have been raised there by their uncle, Ephraim Train, brother of their deceased father, but Enoch was definitely born in Weston, Massachusetts.
