= Ocean Monarch =

Ocean Monarch is the name of a number of ships.

- Ocean Monarch (barque), a barque that caught fire in 1848 with the loss of nearly 180 lives
- SS Ocean Monarch (1904), Russell and Co., Port Glasgow.
- SS Ocean Monarch (1950), a Furness, Withy ship
- SS Ocean Monarch (1956), a Shaw, Savill & Albion ship
- Ocean Monarch (1955), the previous name of the cruise ship Princess Daphne
