= Adeline Dutton Train Whitney =

American writer

Adeline Train Whitney
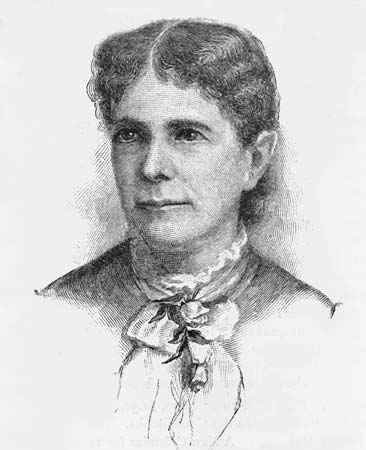
- Born: Adeline Train; September 15, 1824; Boston, Massachusetts, U.S.
- Died: March 20, 1906 (aged 81); Milton, Massachusetts, U.S.
- Education: School of George B. Emerson
- Occupations: poet, writer
- Spouse: Seth Dunbar Whitney (m. 1843)
- Writing career
- Pen name: A. D. T. Whitney
- Language: English
- Genre: Young girls

Signature
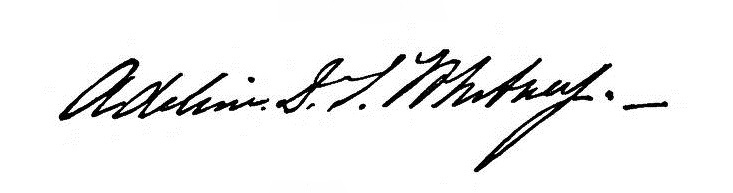

Adeline Dutton Train Whitney (pen name, A. D. T. Whitney; September 15, 1824 – March 20, 1906) was an American poet and writer who published more than 20 books for girls. Her books were popular throughout her life.

Her first venture was a Book of Rhymes. Then followed: Mother Goose for Grown Folks, Boys at Chequassett, Faith Gartney's Girlhood, Hitherto — a Story of Yesterday, Prince Strong's Outings, The Gayworthys, Leslie Goldthwaite, We Girls, Holy Tides, Real Folks, The Other Girls, Sights and Insights, Odd and Even, Bannyborough Whiten Memories, Daffodils, Pansies, Homespun Yarns, Ascutney Street, A Golden Gossip, Bird Talk, and Just How.

== Early life and education ==
Adeline Dutton Train was born in Boston, Massachusetts, September 15, 1824. She was the daughter of Enoch Train and Adeline Train (née Dutton). With his cousin, Samuel Train of Medford, Enoch did an extensive mercantile business, owning vessels, and trading to Russia and South America. In later years, he established his line of packet ships between Boston and Liverpool, thereafter known as the "Warren Line". George Francis Train, a founder of the Union Pacific Railroad, was her cousin.

When she was thirteen, her mother presented Whitney with a complete set of the stories of Maria Edgeworth, and gave her permission to read them. Edgeworth's works proved influential on Whitney's later writings.

Most of Whitney's education was conducted in Boston. She attended the school of George B. Emerson from the age of thirteen through eighteen, from 1837 to 1842, with the exception of one year spent at Northampton, under the care of Margarette Dwight. Emerson was a Unitarian; Dwight was a Calvinist. In those days, there was an excited controversial division between the Unitarian and the Orthodox. Of this she said:— "After what has been said, incidentally, concerning alternating religious training and influences, I may suitably say that the result of all has been that I have recently connected myself with the church of the 'Apostles' Creed,' finding there the germ and foundation of all that has either broadened or narrowed from it; and am content to rest in that body which recognizes 'the blessed company of all faithful people,'—claiming the right to interpret those words with all the liberalism which they imply."

In the church and Sunday school of Dr. Lyman Beecher, and his successor, Hubbard Winslow, she received her first religious impressions. Afterwards, on her father's second marriage with a woman who belonged to the Unitarian church, the family changed their connection, under the care of Dr. Lowell. "Here," Whitney wrote, "I found a somewhat different, though not antagonistic teaching, for those were the early days when there was still a simple faith, even among those who had unbound it from the Puritan rigidity. To Dr. Lowell, Dr. Bartol, and Mrs. Bartol, who as Miss Howard, was my Sunday-school teacher, I owe the beginning of my most earnest thinking."

== Career ==
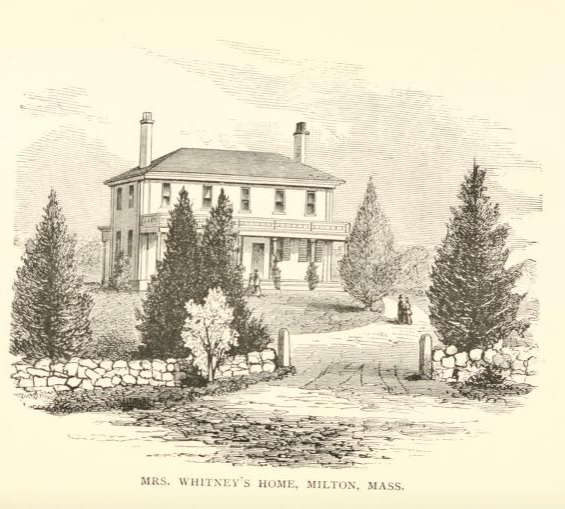
The Whitney home in Milton

On November 7, 1843, she married Seth Dunbar Whitney, a wealthy merchant of Milton, who was twenty years older than herself. They lived in Milton, where they raised their family. For many years her household obligations prevented her from devoting time to her literary work, apart from an occasional article to a religious journal.

Whitney started writing seriously in her thirties, after her children started school. She first published poems and stories in local journals. Her first writing appeared in the Religious Magazine, published by Bishop Frederic Dan Huntington. In the winter of 1859, Rudd & Carleton published for her Mother Goose for Grown Folks, a little jeu d'esprit, for Christmas.

In 1861, she wrote Boys at Chequasset, which may have been inspired by her son. In June, 1862, she published Faith Gartney's Girlhood. Both these books were issued by Loring in Boston, and were immediately successful. In 1864, the same publisher released The Gayworthys, published simultaneously in England by Sampson, Low, Son & Co. In 1866, she issued as a serial in Our Young Folks titled "A Summer in Leslie Goldthwaite's Life." Between 1868 and 1870, she published "Patience Strong's Outings" in Christian Register, which was published by Loring. She also furnished a serial called "We Girls" to Our Young Folks, which was published in book form by Fields, Osgood & Co. In 1869, she published Hitherto, which appeared simultaneously in England. Whitney secured the English copyright by being in Montreal at the time of publication.

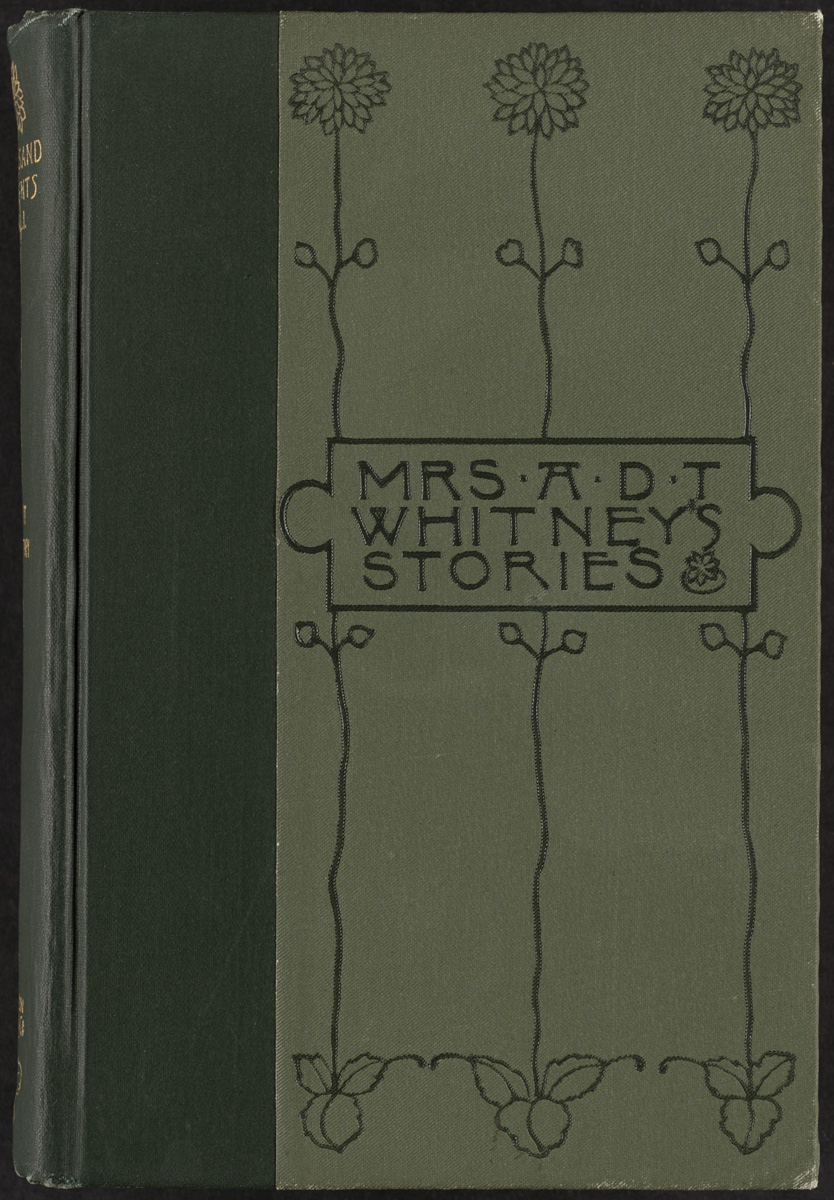
Sights and insights

Her later works included Real Folks and The Other Girls, published by Osgood & Co., from 1872 to 1873. After this followed Sights and Insights, detailing the experiences of a party travelling in Europe. In the winter of 1877, Whitney compiled a cookbook entitled Just How, and in the spring of 1879, she published Odd or Even with Osgood & Co. After the issue of Odd or Even, Messrs. Houghton & Osgood, having previously purchased from Loring the plates of all Whitney's other books, prepared a uniform edition of all her works. From time to time, Whitney published poetry in the Atlantic Monthly, or other papers; these were collected in a volume entitled "Pansies," published by Osgood & Co. in 1872.

The 1905, New International Encyclopedia expressed the opinion that with Hitherto (1869) "the period of her best work ends." Whitney also patented a set of alphabet blocks for children.

== Personal life ==
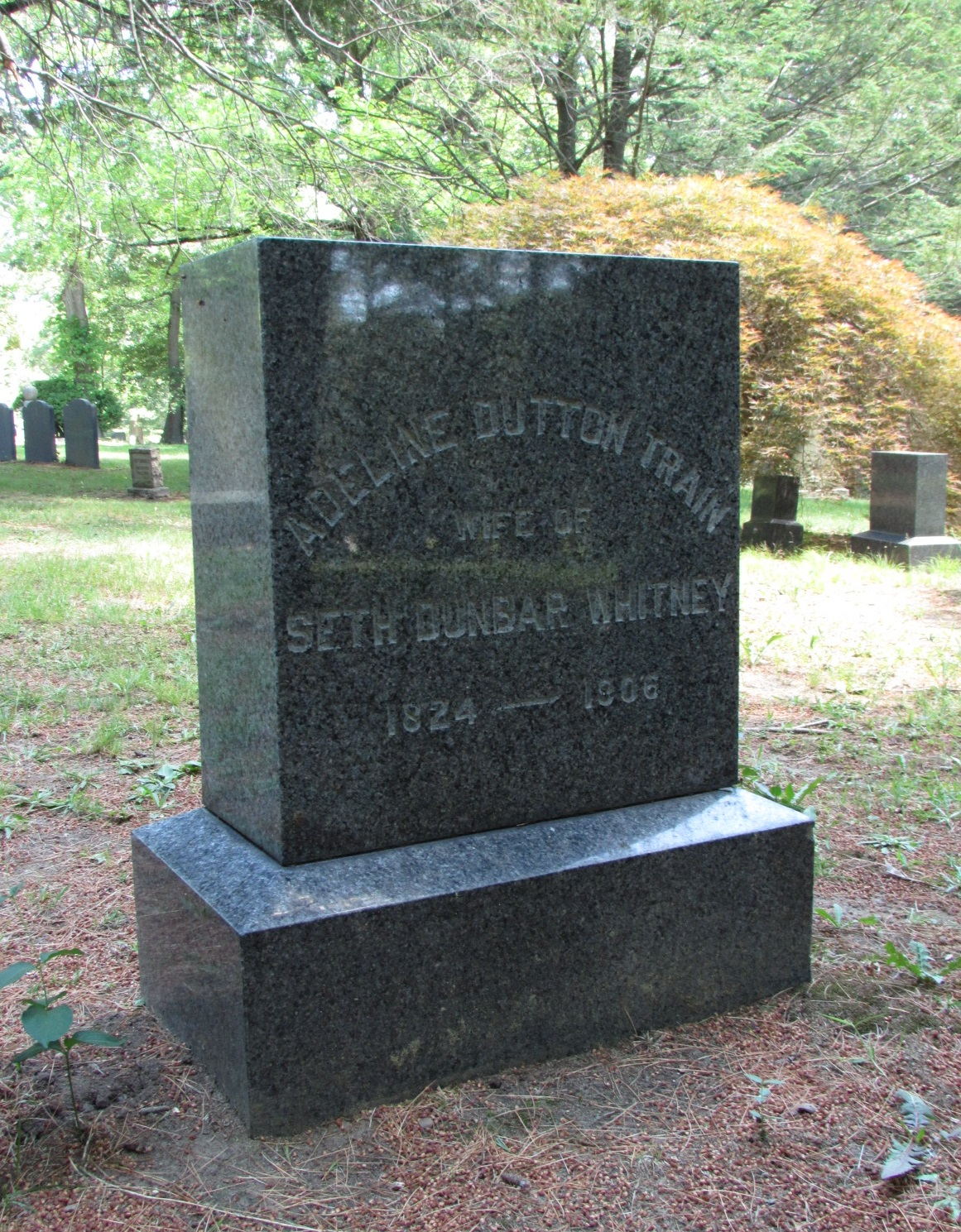
Grave in Milton Cemetery

Whitney privately opposed women's suffrage, and took no part in public life. Her daughter, Caroline Leslie Field, published prose and verse. She was known to the reading public through her contributions to periodicals. Whitney died in Milton at the age of 81.

== Style and themes ==
Whitney wrote mainly for young girls and supported conservative values, notably the belief that a woman's happiest place is in the home.

Whitney's poetry expressed the idea of an unbroken sympathy between the living and the dead. As in family prayers, Whitney believed that families united on earth and in heaven.

Whitney's story The Other Girls is unique among her works due to its portrayal of characters in dire circumstances grappling with complex moral issues. In The Other Girls, a young country girl, Bel Bree, catches the attention of Morris Hewland, who refuses to marry her but offers to make her his mistress. Bel refuses. Whitney comments on the much-mooted woman question by implying that marriage and family life should be a young woman's priority. Other scenes depict Bel Bree and Kate Senserbo becoming servants for a young family where there is mutual appreciativeness and care between employer and employees.

== Selected works ==
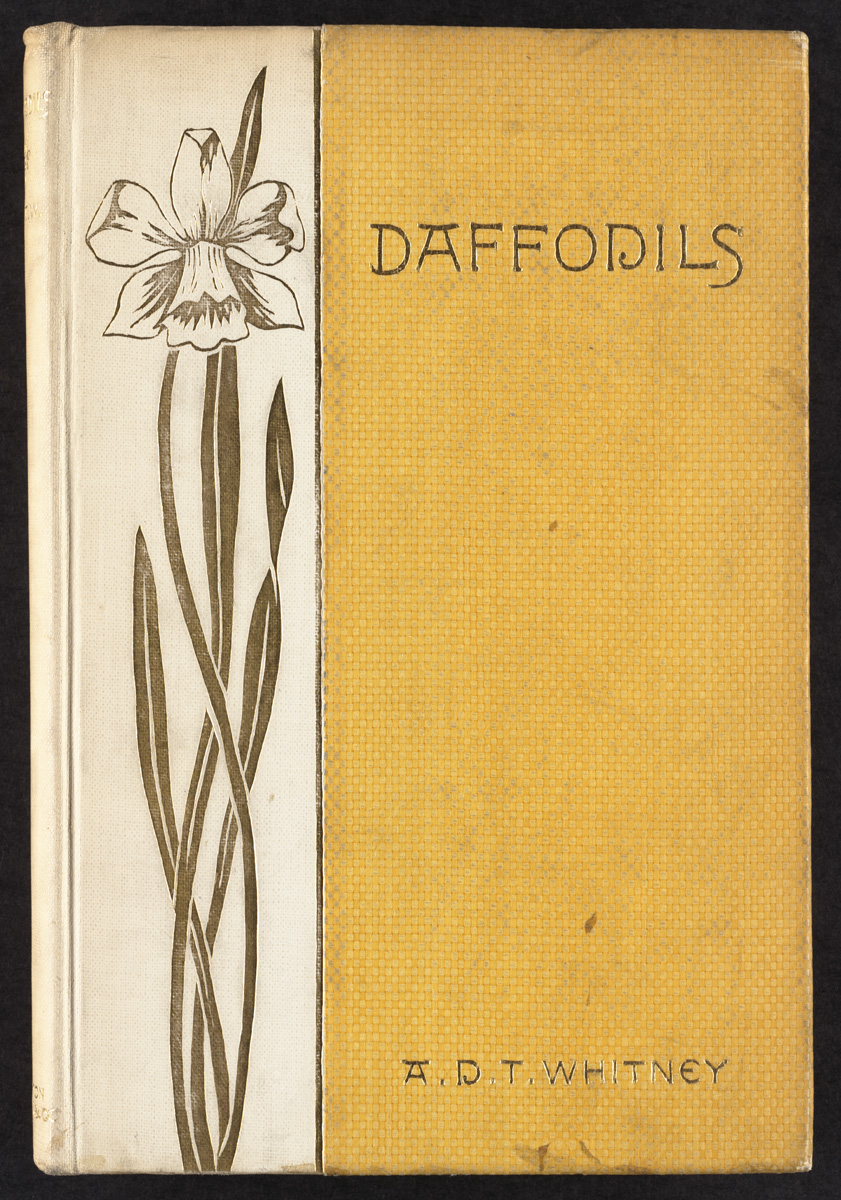
Daffodils, 1887

- 1857: "Footsteps on the Seas" (poem)
- 1859: Mother Goose for Grown Folks (new editions in 1870 and 1882)
- 1868: Boys at Chequasset
- 1863: Faith Gartney's Girlhood
- 1865: The Gayworthys
- 1866: A Summer in Leslie Goldthwaite's Life
- 1868: Patience Strong's Outings
- 1869: Hitherto
- 1870: We Girls
- 1871: Real Folks
- 1872: Pansies (poems)
- 1873: The Other Girls
- 1876: Sights and Insights
- 1878: Just How: A Key to the Cook Books
- 1880: Odd or Even
- 1885: Bonnyborough
- 1886: Homespun Yarns
- 1886: Holy Tides
- 1887: Daffodils
- 1888: Bird Talk
- 1890: Ascutney Street
- 1891: A Golden Gossip
- 1894: Square Pegs
- 1896: Friendly Letters to Girl Friends
- 1897: The Open Mystery: A Reading of the Mosaic Story
- 1900: The Integrity of Christian Science
