= Donald McKay (clipper) =

Ship built by Donald McKay in 1855

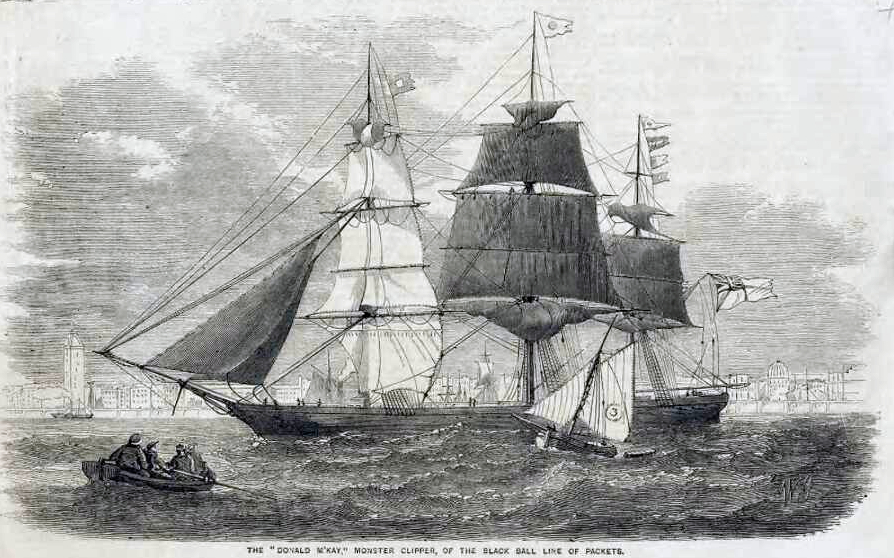
- Donald McKay

History

United Kingdom
- Namesake: Donald McKay, ship builder
- Owner: James Baines & Co.
- Builder: Donald McKay, East Boston
- Launched: January 1855
- Fate: Burned and broken up in 1888

General characteristics
- Type: Clipper
- Tonnage: 2604 RT, 2486 GRT, and 1616 NRT
- Length: 266 ft (81 m)
- Beam: 46.25 ft (14.10 m)
- Draft: 29.4 ft (9.0 m)
- Propulsion: Sails
- Sail plan: She was equipped with Howes patent double topsails

Donald McKay was an extreme clipper designed by Donald McKay, his last. Built for James Baines & Co., she sailed on the Black Ball Line of Liverpool from 1855 to 1868, carrying passengers and mail between England and Australia.

Donald McKay achieved several notable voyages during her active years. One of her most significant accomplishments was setting a record for the fastest voyage from Liverpool, England, to Melbourne, Australia, completing the journey in just 63 days.

Unfortunately, like many other clipper ships, her commercial success was relatively short-lived. The advent of steam-powered ships and changes in maritime transportation gradually rendered all sailing vessels less economically viable, especially the fast but limited hull displacement clippers.

Donald McKay ended her days as a coal hulk in Portugal. Her figurehead is located at the Mystic Seaport Museum in Mystic, Connecticut, USA.

== History ==
Donald McKay was launched on Donald McKay's shipyard in East Boston, USA, in January 1855. Newspapers reported that she had "all the airy beauty of a clipper combined with the stately outline of a ship of war and, though not sharp, yet her great length, buoyancy, and stability, indicate[d] that she [would] sail very fast, and be an excellent sea boat". Her passenger capacity was reported at 591 plus crew.

=== Voyages ===
- In 1855, on her maiden voyage, she sailed from Boston to Liverpool under command of Captain Henry Warner in 17 days.
- In 1855, from 6 June to 21 August she sailed from Liverpool to Port Phillip, Melbourne, in 81 days.
- In 1855, from 2 October to 28 December she sailed from Melbourne to Liverpool, in 86 days.
- In 1856, from 4 October to 1(?) January 1857 she sailed from Liverpool to Melbourne.
- In 1857, in February, she cleared out 365.25 ounces of gold through Melbourne customs for Liverpool.
- In 1857, from 8 July to 29 September, she sailed from Liverpool to Port Phillip, Melbourne, in 83 days.
- In 1857, in November, she cleared out 205 ounces of gold through Melbourne customs and sailed to Liverpool from 5 December to 1 March 1858.
- In 1858, on 8 August, she arrived in Melbourne from Liverpool.
- In 1858, in November, she cleared out 34,390 ounces of gold through Melbourne customs for Liverpool.
- In 1859, on 4 July, she arrived to Melbourne from Liverpool, in 87 days.
- In 1859, on 8 November, she departed Port of Melbourne for Liverpool, carrying 4 ounces of gold.
- In March 1861, upon arrival in Melbourne from Liverpool, Donald McKay was placed in quarantine due to cases of smallpox on board.
- In 1862, on 9 October, arrived in Melbourne.
- In 1863, on 30 July, arrived in Melbourne.
- In March 1864, Donald McKay bound for London collided with the barque Albina in the English Channel. Donald McKay was at fault and fined the full amount of the damage of £15,000 to Albina.
- In 1865, on 4 December, she arrived in Melbourne.
- In 1866, she was sold to Thomas Harrison and was chartered back to the Black Ball Line under the new ownership.
- Her arrivals of the last three voyages to Melbourne were on 22 December 1866, 21 November 1867 and 19 November 1868.
- In 1874, after arriving in Melbourne on her 13th voyage, she was sold for £8,750. She was placed on the Pacific trade.
- In 1879, she was sold to the German company Bertus Bartlin' of Bremerhaven, reportedly becoming old and leaking water.

==== Fate ====
- In 1886, she was used as a coal hulk in Madeira.
- In 1888, she caught fire and was broken up.

== See also ==
- List of clipper ships
