= Glory of the Seas (clipper) =

19th c. American clipper ship

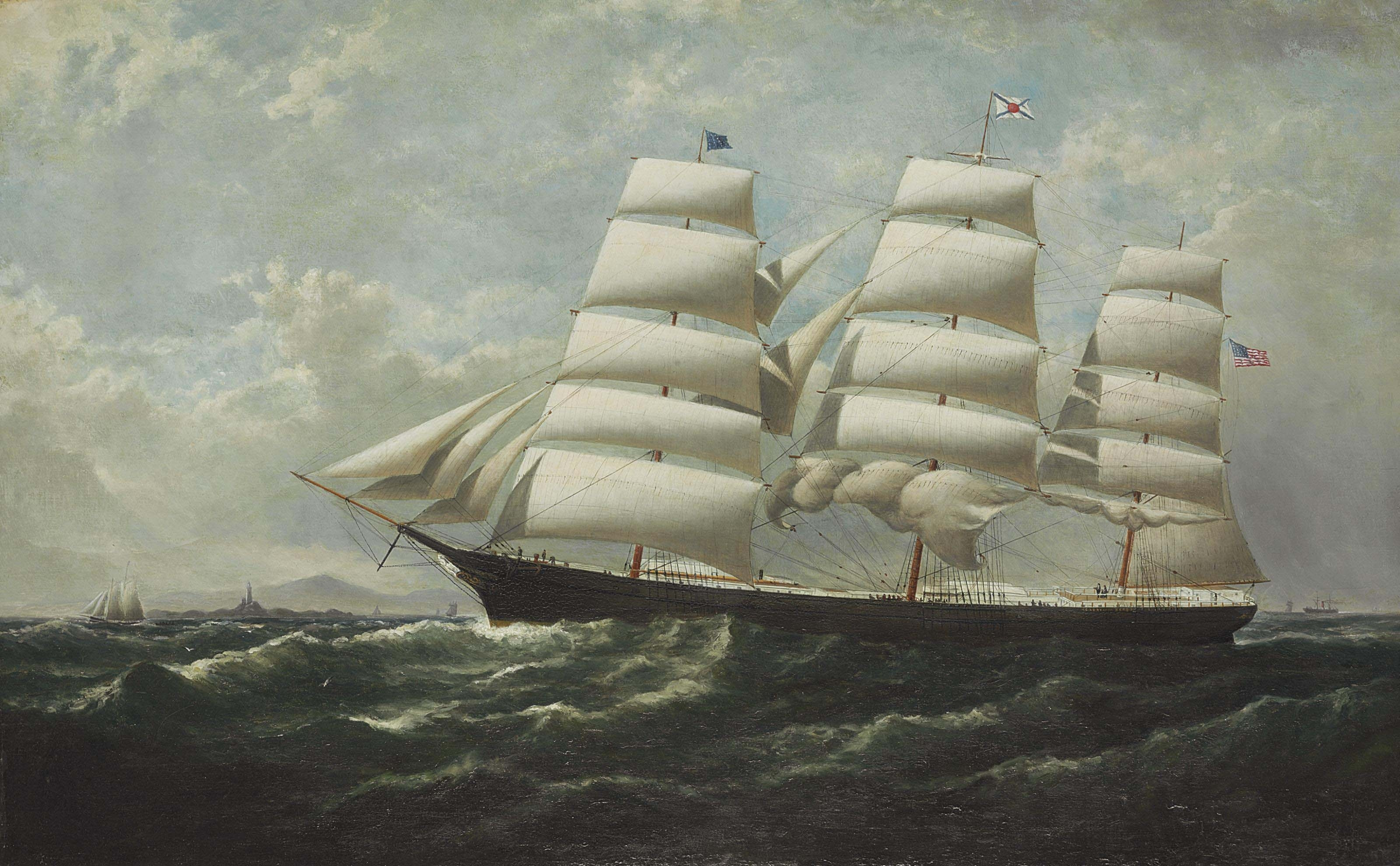
- Glory of the Seas

History

United States
- Name: Glory of the Seas
- Owner: Donald McKay (original)
- Builder: Donald McKay of East Boston, MA
- Laid down: May 1869
- Launched: October 21, 1869
- In service: 1870
- Out of service: 1923
- Fate: Burned for her metal May 13, 1923
- Notes: The last merchant sailing vessel built by McKay

General characteristics
- Class & type: Medium clipper
- Tons burthen: 2102 tons
- Length: 240 feet (73.152 m)
- Draft: 22
- Depth of hold: 28.5 feet (8.7 m)
- Propulsion: sail
- Sail plan: Double topsails, single topgallants and royals, and main skysail ; all sails totaled "about 8000 yards of cotton duck"
- Complement: Complement on maiden voyage in 1870: 35

Glory of the Seas was a medium clipper ship launched in 1869. She was the last merchant sailing vessel built by Donald McKay.

== Voyages ==
On her maiden voyage, Glory of the Seas sailed from New York in February 1870 under the command of Captain Donald McKay, according to Custom House records. Donald McKay hired Capt.John Geit as sailing master per McKay family correspondence. She anchored at San Francisco on June 13 after a passage of 120 days. From there she sailed to Liverpool, England, under Captain William Chatfield. Donald McKay subsequently went bankrupt in 1870–1871. As a result, McKay's creditors sold Glory to J. Henry Sears of Boston, as managing owner, and a group of investors. Sears subsequently replaced Captain Chatfield with Josiah Nickerson Knowles who purchased an interest in the ship.

Details of her time between 1870 and 1885 are incomplete, but she "ran between New York and British ports and San Francisco almost exclusively" during those years. She did make a fast voyage from New York to San Francisco between October 13, 1873, and mid-January, 1874 (see the table and note). In 1875 she set the record of 35 days for a passage from San Francisco to Sydney, Australia. According to McKay, until 1885 under Captain McLaughlin Glory carried general cargo from New York to San Francisco and wheat from there to Britain, and was nearly wrecked in a storm when arriving in Britain in 1880. The Bruzelius timetable (below) differs and does not mention the 1880 event. Both agree that she was laid up at San Francisco between December 1882 and February 1885.

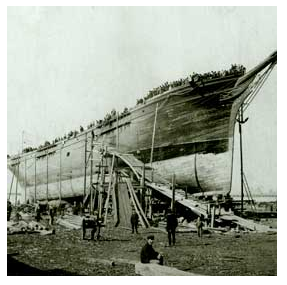
Glory of the Seas in Boston. McKay appears at the center of the photograph wearing a top hat.

After 1885, Glory of the Seas spent the rest of her long life on the Pacific coast, for a time sailing between San Francisco and Puget Sound, British Columbia, and made four voyages to Alaska. In March 1906 she was sold in San Francisco for conversion to a barge but was repaired after the April earthquake and "put under sail again". She made a voyage to Callao in 1907–1908, hauled coal under tow from Nanaimo, BC, to Seattle from fall 1908 to spring 1909, and in September 1910 made a voyage hauling coal from Victoria, BC, to Unalaska. Under new owners in 1911, she was stripped of most of her spars and converted to a floating fish cannery and then to a floating cold storage plant. She remained in service as a reefer until early 1922. In December 1922 she was beached near Seattle and on May 13, 1923, was burned to recover her iron and copper fastenings.

Glory of the Seas' known voyages are tabulated below. Entries are from Bruzelius unless noted otherwise; disagreements or ambiguities are individually cited. City names are as they were at the time.

Origin	Depart	Destination	Arrive	Days	Captain
New York	February 13 or 14, 1870	San Francisco	June 13, 1870	120 (Note: February 13 to June 13 is 120 days, so the McKay date is wrong.)	John Geit (Note: Shipping papers list the master as "McKay" for this New York-San Francisco voyage, and for the next one as far as Queenstown, then changes to Chatfield)
San Francisco	July 30 or August 4, 1870	Queenstown, Ireland (for orders), then London	November 24, 1870 (Queenstown)	112	William Chatfield
Saint John, New Brunswick	May 14, 1871 (Note: She initially departed on May 13, but struck on the bar; after refloating she was towed in and surveyed, then sailing on the following day.)	Liverpool	June 8, 1871	25	Sears
Cardiff, Wales	August 19, 1871	San Francisco	December 16, 1871	120	Josiah Nickerson Knowles
San Francisco	February 7, 1872	Liverpool	May 28, 1872	112	Knowles
Liverpool	July 27, 1872	San Francisco	November 25, 1872	119	Knowles
San Francisco	January 15, 1873	Liverpool	May 23, 1873	128	Knowles
New York	October 13, 1873	San Francisco	January 16 or 18, 1874	96 or 94 (Note: Neither passage length matches the stated arrival date. January 16 is 95 days out and January 18 is 97.)	Knowles
San Francisco	February 26, 1874	Liverpool	June 23, 1874	117	Knowles
Liverpool	August 13, 1874	San Francisco	December 22, 1874	131	Knowles
San Francisco	March 14, 1875	Sydney, Australia	April 19, 1875	35	Knowles
Sydney	June 4, 1875	San Francisco	July 26, 1875	53	Knowles
San Francisco	October 7, 1875	Liverpool	February 17, 1876	133	Knowles
Liverpool	May 2, 1876	San Francisco	August 23, 1876	114	Knowles
San Francisco	October 24, 1876	Liverpool	February 3, 1877	103	Daniel S. McLaughlin (Note: McKay wrongly states that McLaughlin began as captain in 1879.)
Liverpool	April 2, 1877	San Francisco	August 23, 1877	144	McLaughlin
San Francisco	November 9, 1877	Liverpool	February 24, 1878	107	McLaughlin
Liverpool	April 27, 1878	Oakland, California	September 29, 1878	153	McLaughlin
San Francisco	1879	Queenstown (for orders), then Le Havre, France			McLaughlin
New York	1880	San Francisco			McLaughlin
San Francisco	May 29, 1880	Queenstown	September 28, 1880	120	McLaughlin
Cardiff	December 27, 1880	San Francisco	May 3, 1881	129	McLaughlin
San Francisco	July 11, 1881	Le Havre via Valparaíso, Chile	February 17, 1882	220	McLaughlin
New York	July 2, 1882	San Francisco	November 7, 1882	128	McLaughlin
Laid up, San Francisco	December 1882		February 1885		
San Francisco	February 22, 1885	Liverpool	June 19, 1885	119	Joshua S. Freeman
Liverpool	1885	San Pedro, California		121	Freeman (?)

== Artifacts ==
The figurehead of Glory of the Seas is a partially-clad female figure. It is pictured in a book, The Clipper Ships, which notes that it is in the collection of a private New York City club, India House. The builder's half-model, four prints or paintings, and several relics are held by the Mariners' Museum in Newport News, Virginia.
