= Samuel Walters (artist) =

English painter

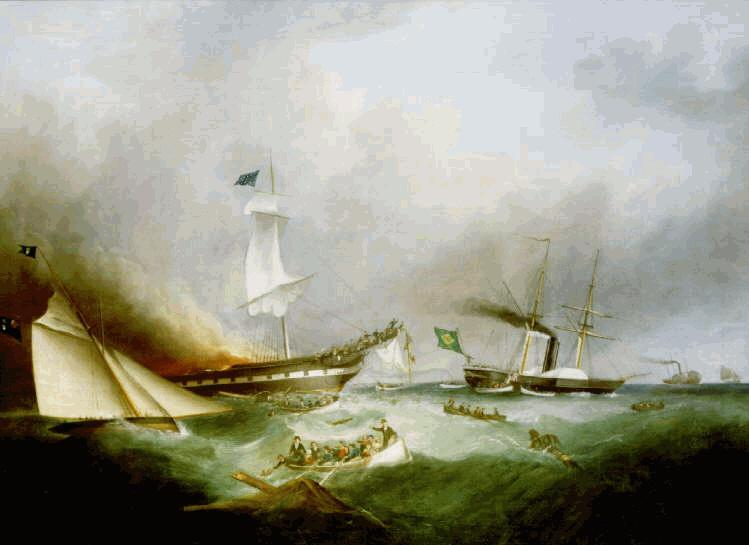
Burning of the Ocean Monarch (1850), Samuel Walters

Samuel Walters (1811 - 1882) was an English maritime artist, considered to be the most enduring figures of the Liverpool School of Marine Art. His father, Miles Walters, was also a (less notable) maritime artist. He was born in London and moved to Liverpool, where he was well known. His work was also popular in North America.

== Life ==
Samuel Walters was born in London. His father was also a maritime artist and while he taught Samuel, Samuel was largely self-taught. Samuel moved to Liverpool and began to exhibit work in 1830. He became a member of the Liverpool Academy of Arts in 1841. He had work exhibited at the Royal Academy from 1842 to 1861 and also lived in London from 1845 to 1847, before returning to Lancashire to live in Bootle. and died in Liverpool on 5th March 1882.

== Works ==
He specialised in oil paintings and watercolours on canvas. The Liverpool Museums Resource lists more than 10 of his paintings as being on permanent display in Liverpool, as well as a collaboration between Walters and his father. Some famous ships he painted include the CSS Florida and CSS Alabama.

His paintings are in public collections throughout the world, including the UK, USA, Canada and Australia.
