= Grønhøj =

- Town
- Location within Denmark
- Coordinates: 56°22′2.94″N 9°12′32.66″E
- Country: Denmark
- Region: Central Denmark (Midtjylland)
- Municipality: Viborg
- Founded: 1760

Population (2010)
  - Total: 209
- Time zone: UTC+1 (CET)
  - Summer (DST): UTC+2 (CEST)
- Postal code: 7470 Karup J

Grønhøj is a small Danish town with a population of 209 (1 January 2010). It is located 15 km southwest of Viborg and 25 km south of Skive, near Alheden in central Jutland.
