= USS Nausett (1865) =

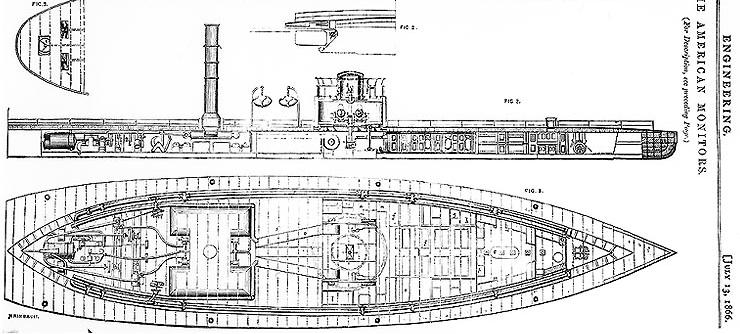
- An engraving of the USS Nausett published in the English magazine "Engineering", 13 July 1866.

History

United States
- Name: USS Nausett
- Ordered: April 1863
- Builder: Donald McKay, Boston, Massachusetts
- Launched: 26 April 1865
- Commissioned: 10 August 1865
- Decommissioned: 24 August 1865
- Fate: Broken up, August 1875

General characteristics
- Class & type: Casco-class monitor
- Displacement: 1,175 long tons (1,194 t)
- Length: 225 ft (69 m)
- Beam: 45 ft (14 m)
- Draft: 9 ft (2.7 m)
- Propulsion: Screw steamer
- Speed: 9 kn (10 mph; 17 km/h)
- Complement: 69 officers and enlisted
- Armament: 2 × 11 in (280 mm) smoothbore Dahlgren guns
- Armor: Turret: 8 in (200 mm); Pilothouse: 10 in (250 mm); Hull: 3 in (76 mm); Deck: 3 in (76 mm)

USS Nausett, a single-turreted, twin-screw monitor, was built by Donald McKay, South Boston, MA, and launched on 26 April 1865, and commissioned on 10 August 1865, Acting Master Win. U. Grozier in command. Soon after her commissioning, she steamed to New York, NY, where she decommissioned on 24 August 1865, and was laid up at the New York Navy Yard.

Nausett was a Casco-class, light-draft monitor intended for service in the shallow bays, rivers, and inlets of the Confederacy. These warships sacrificed armor plate for a shallow draft and were fitted with a ballast compartment designed to lower them in the water during battle.

== Design revisions ==
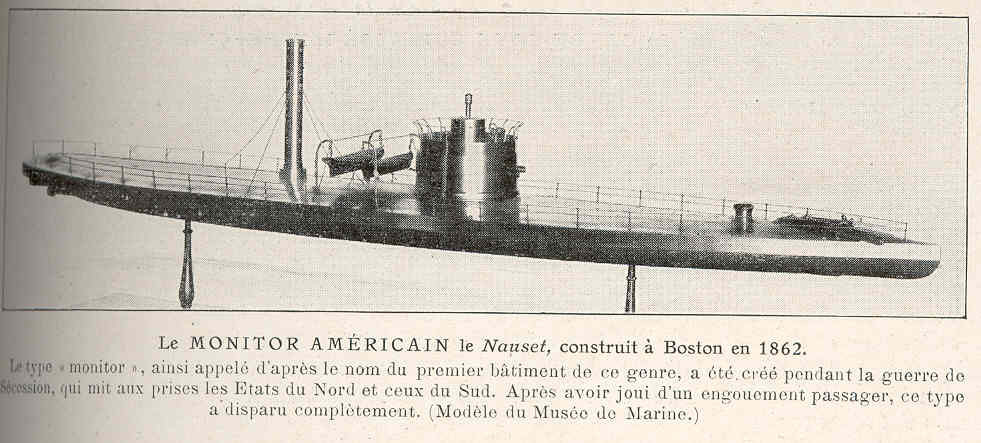
Model of the Nausett, built in Boston in 1862

The contract to Donald McKay was originally announced in 1863. Though the original designs for the Casco-class monitors were drawn by John Ericsson, the final revision was created by Chief Engineer Alban C. Stimers following Rear Admiral Samuel F. Du Pont's failed bombardment of Fort Sumter in 1863. By the time that the plans were put before the Monitor Board in New York City, Ericsson and Stimers had a poor relationship, and Chief of the Bureau of Construction and Repair John Lenthall had little connection to the board. This resulted in the plans being approved and 20 vessels ordered without serious scrutiny of the new design. $14 million US was allocated for the construction of these vessels. It was discovered that Stimers had failed to compensate for the armor his revisions added to the original plan and this resulted in excessive stress on the wooden hull frames and a freeboard of only 3 in (7.6 cm). Stimers was removed from the control of the project and Ericsson was called in to undo the damage. He was forced to raise the hulls of the monitors under construction by 22 in (56 cm) to make them seaworthy.

== Fate ==
As a result, Nausett remained in ordinary at New York for 10 years, during which time she was renamed twice: Aetna on 15 June 1869; and back to Nausett on 10 August 1869. In August 1875, she was broken up by John Roach of New York.
