= Sovereign of the Seas (clipper) =

19th c. American clipper ship

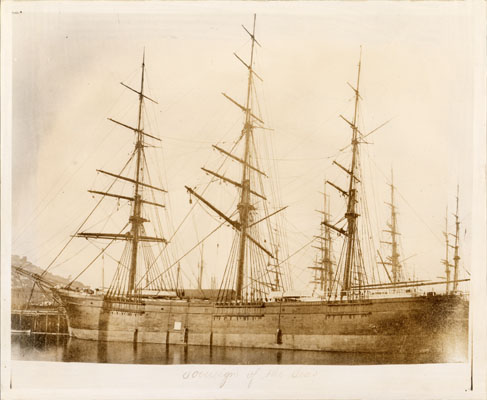
- Sovereign of the Seas

History

United States
- Builder: Donald McKay of East Boston, MA
- Launched: 1852
- Fate: Ran aground on the Pyramid Shoal in the Strait of Malacca, becoming a total loss, on voyage from Hamburg to China, 6 August 1859

General characteristics
- Class & type: Extreme clipper
- Tons burthen: 2421 tons.
- Length: 252 ft (77 m)
- Beam: 45.6 ft (13.9 m)
- Draft: 29.2 ft (8.9 m)
- Notes: Has held the record for the fastest speed ever for a sailing ship, 22 kn (41 km/h), since 1854

Sovereign of the Seas, a clipper ship built in 1852, was a sailing vessel notable for setting the world record for the fastest sailing ship, with a speed of 22 knots (41 km/h). (Note: Note that this is a very specific record. It applies to a ship in the most literal sense, a three-masted, square-rigged, sailing vessel. It has been far exceeded by multi-hulled sailing craft and modern monohulls.)

== Notable passages ==
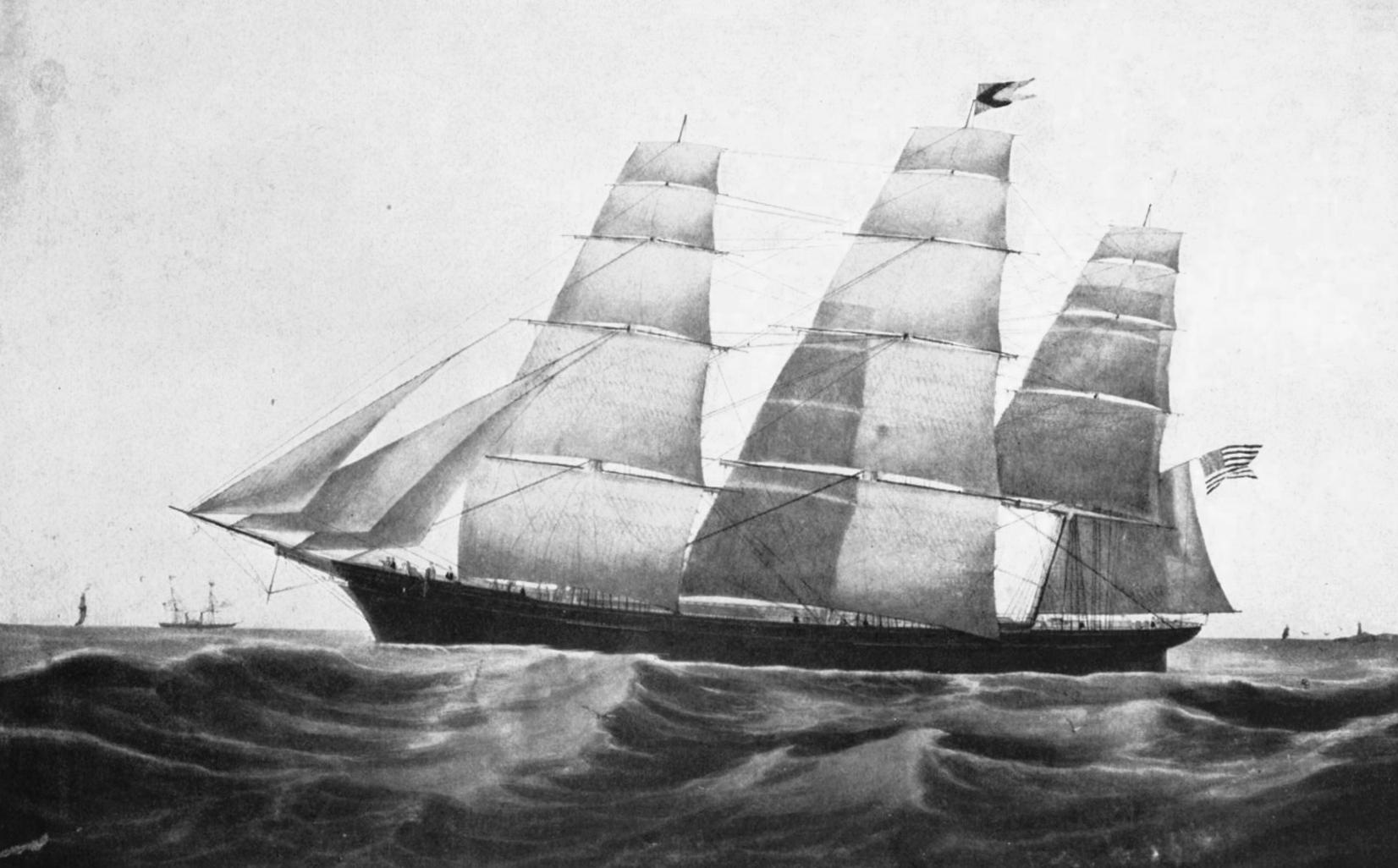
Drawing of Sovereign of the Seas from a 1910 book

Built by Donald McKay of East Boston, Massachusetts, Sovereign of the Seas was the first ship to travel more than 400 nautical miles (740 kilometres) in 24 hours. On the second leg of her maiden voyage, she made a record passage from Honolulu, Hawaii, to New York City in 82 days. She then broke the record to Liverpool, England, making the passage in 13 days 13 1/2 hours. In 1853 she was chartered by James Baines of the Black Ball Line, Liverpool for the Australia trade.

=== Record ===
In 1854, Sovereign of the Seas recorded the fastest speed for a sailing ship, logging 22 knots (41 km/h).

== See also ==
- Donald McKay
- List of large sailing vessels
- Transatlantic sailing record
