= Ocean Monarch (barque) =

Emigration barque that caught fire and sank off the coast of Wales, UK in 1848

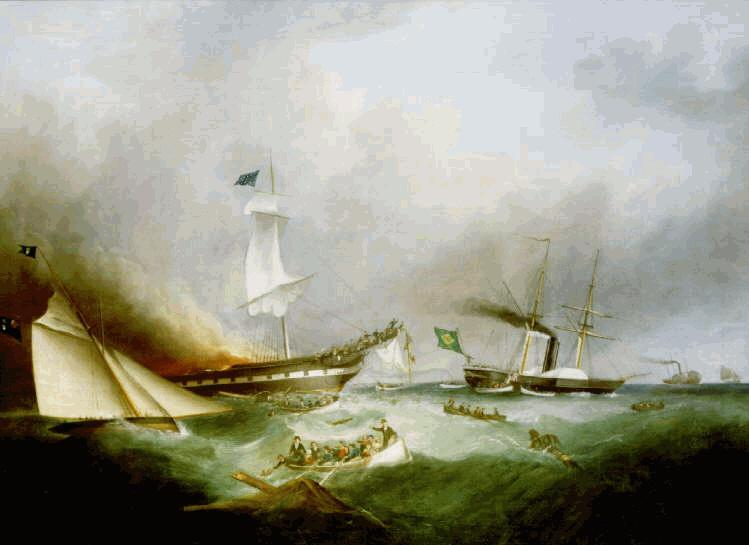
- Burning of the Ocean Monarch (1850) by Samuel Walters

History

United States
- Name: Ocean Monarch
- Operator: White Diamond Line
- Port of registry: Boston, Massachusetts
- Route: Boston-Liverpool
- Builder: Donald McKay, East Boston
- Launched: July 1847
- Fate: Caught fire and sank, 24/25 August 1848

General characteristics
- Type: Barque
- Tons burthen: 1,301 tons bm
- Length: 179 ft (55 m)

Ocean Monarch was an American emigration barque built by Donald McKay in East Boston in 1847. She is famous for her ill fate: in 1848, she caught fire at sea and sank in Llandudno, North Wales, with the loss of 178 lives.

== History ==
Ocean Monarch was launched from the East Boston shipyard of Donald McKay on 13 June 1847. With three regular decks she measured at 177 feet between uprights, 40 feet beam and 27 feet depth. She had a 7 foot tall figurehead of Neptune. Ocean Monarch was registered at 1301 tons. Her first captain was Murdoch, previously commanded James Bates. The estimate cost was reported at $80,000. She was the biggest American ship at the time and the second ship on the Atlantic route. The barque was owned by the White Diamond Line and was registered in Boston.

== Burning of Ocean Monarch ==
Ocean Monarch had left Liverpool on the morning of 24 August 1848 carrying passengers to Boston in the United States. Helmed by Captain Murdoch, Ocean Monarch was towed from the port and entered the open sea around eight o'clock in the morning. Not far from harbor, between Abergele Bay and Great Orme's Head off Llandudno, at around noon, Ocean Monarch was witnessed to put up its helm as if to return to port and then a flag of distress was raised. Within a short time flames were seen rising towards the rear of the vessel.

In an attempt to control the fire, which was now a blaze, Captain Murdoch attempted to turn the ship up wind, but in failing to do so, dropped both anchors. At this time it was apparent that the crew had lost control of the passengers who had begun fleeing the fire, rushing around deck in panic and even throwing themselves overboard. The captain ordered all movable spars overboard to give those passengers in the water an aid in flotation.

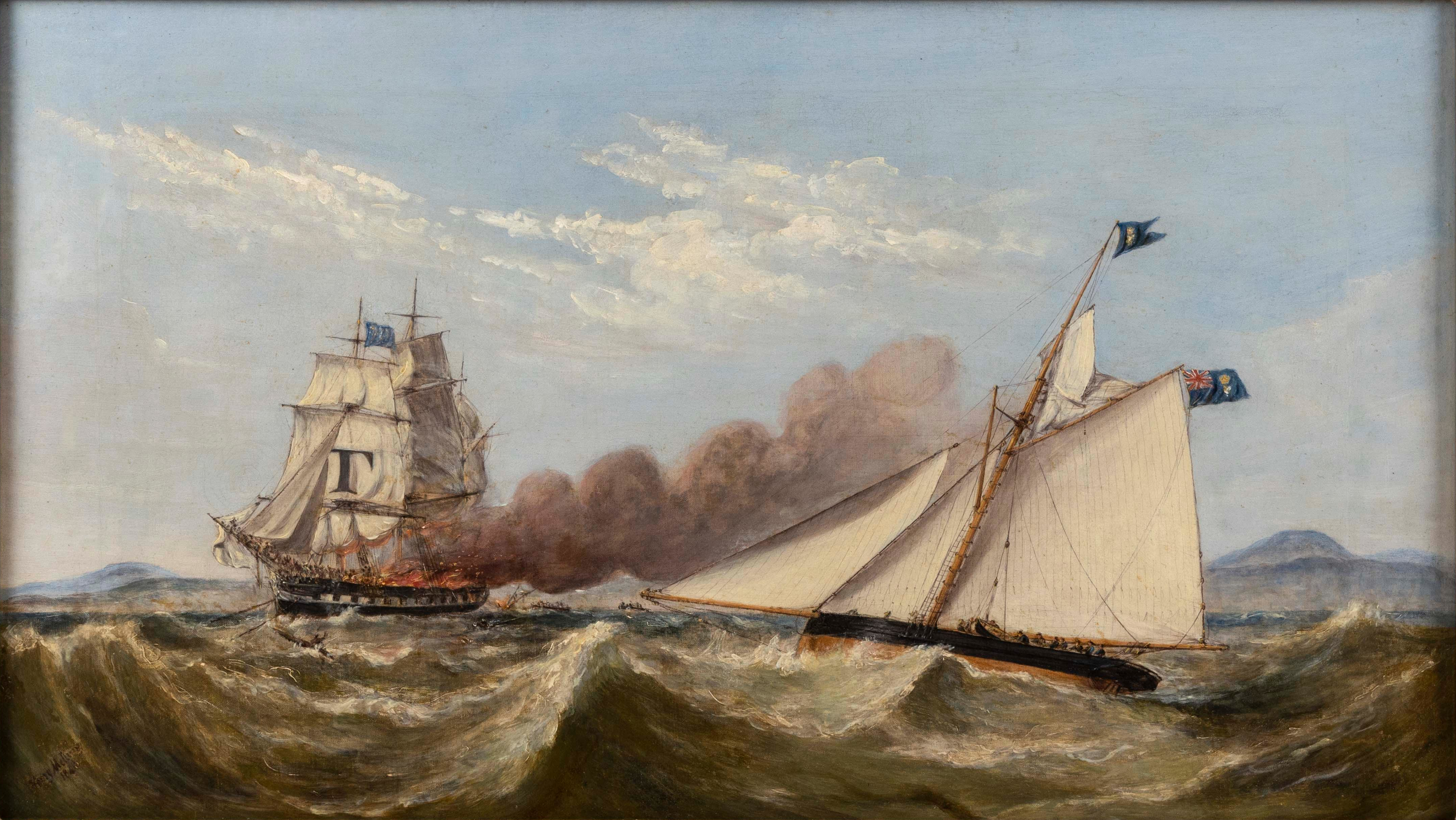
The Queen of the Ocean comes to the rescue, by Henry Melling

Two other vessels in the area, came immediately to the ships aid, they were the yacht Queen of the Ocean, captained by Mr. Thomas Littledale; and the Brazilian frigate Dom Afonso, captained by Joaquim Marques Lisboa. On board of Dom Afonso were Prince de Joinville, Duke and Duchess of Aumale, a Brazilian Minister, and Admiral John Pascoe Grenfell. The latter one and Captain Lisboa manned two of the four boats lowered from Dom Afonso to assist in rescue. Later on the American packet New World and the railway steamer Prince of Wales joined the rescue. These rescuing vessels launched boats to aid the collection of the survivors. Dom Afonso managed to get close enough to Ocean Monarch to fasten a rope to her allowing for rapid ferrying of passengers via boats.

By three o'clock the last ship at the scene, Queen of the Ocean turned and headed for Liverpool with their cargo of survivors.

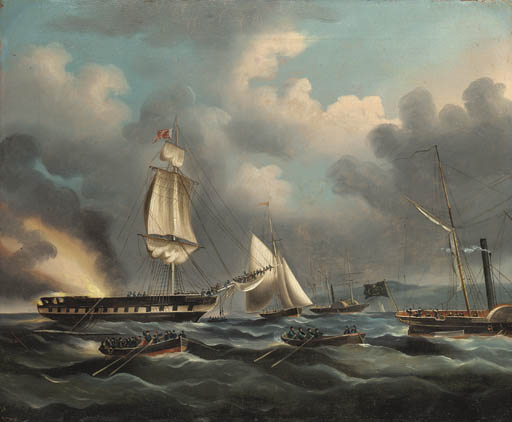
The wreck of the Ocean Monarch off Great Orme's Head, by Charles Henry Seaforth

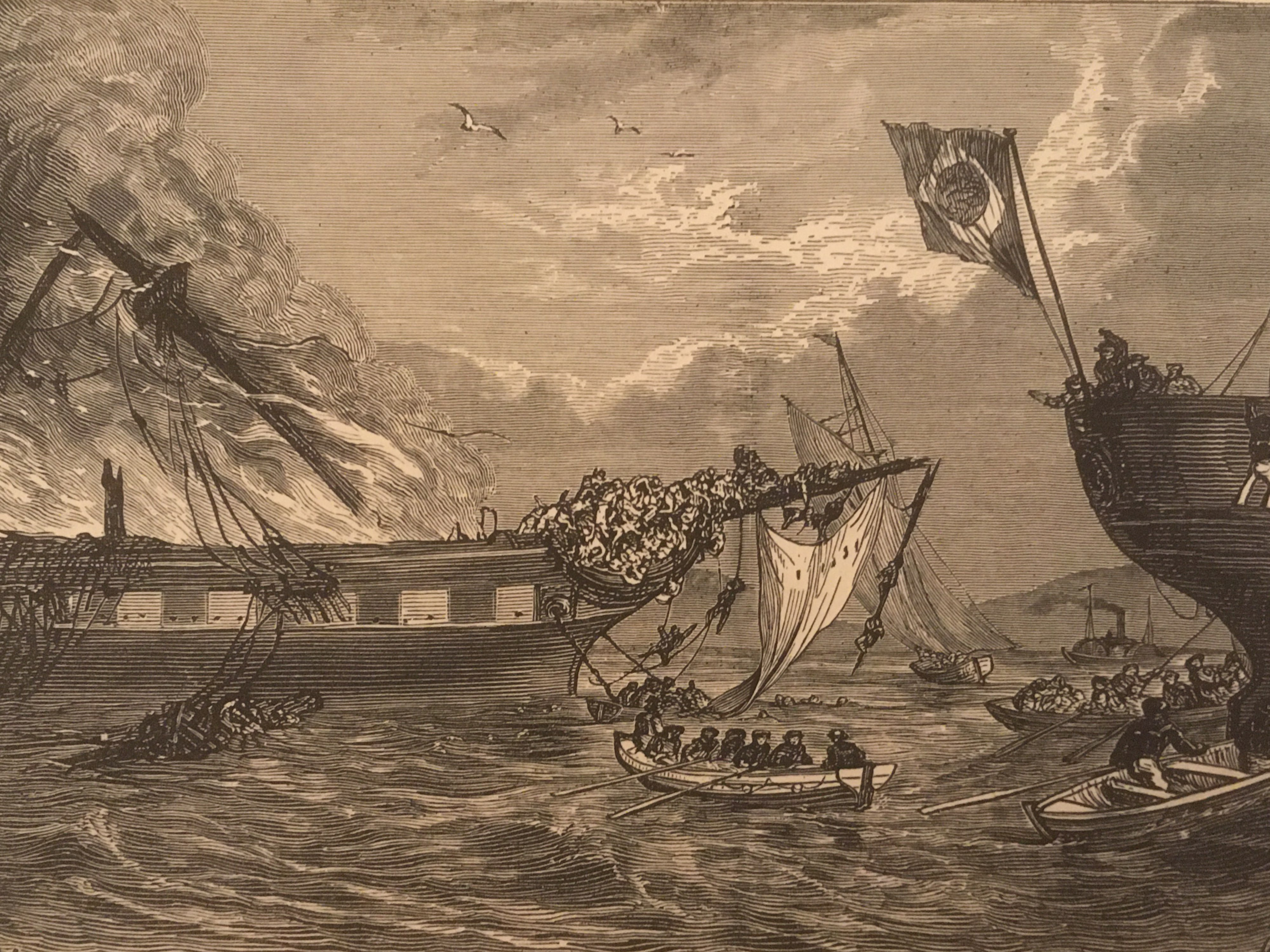
Engraving from the frontispiece of Notable Shipwrecks, by Uncle Hardy, published in London, 1879, showing the stern of the Dom Afonso, right

On 25 August 1848 Ocean Monarch went down at her anchored point to a depth of roughly 14 fathoms (26 m). Her location is listed at 53°25′40.00″N 3°35′27.00″W.

The Burning of the Ocean Monarch off the Great Orme is a series of three paintings by British artist Samuel Walters (1811–1882).

== Cause of the fire ==
It was initially reported in the Liverpool Mercury that the fire came from a wooden ventilator, which a passenger had mistaken for a chimney. This was later refuted by Captain Murdoch, stating that the craft had iron ventilators, and he believed that smoking amongst the steerage passengers, from whom he had confiscated smoking pipes earlier, was the cause.

== Frederick Jerome ==
Frederick Jerome, a sailor working aboard New World, born in Portsmouth but then a resident of New York, showed personal bravery during the rescue. He dived into the sea, swam to the burning ship and lifted more than fifteen female passengers into a rescuing boat. On his return to New York he was awarded the freedom of the city by the Common Council of New York. He also received a £50 award from Queen Victoria and another £50 from the Prince de Joinville and the Duc d'Aumale, both aboard the Dom Afonso.

== Survivor statistics ==
Almost all the cabin (1st Class) passengers were saved.

Count of persons aboard Ocean Monarch
Class	Count
Steerage passengers	322
1st Class and 2nd Class	32
Captain and crew	42
Total	398
Correct as of 2007-08-27

Lives saved by vessel
Vessel	Count
Dom Afonso	156
Queen of the Ocean	32
Prince of Wales	17
Fishing smack	13
Total saved	218
Total lives lost	178^{1}
Correct as of 2007-08-27

^{1} The figures given for the event are mathematically incorrect, but are recorded as given by the newspapers of the time.

== Burial of three supposed victims ==
The parish registers for Warton, on Morecambe Bay about 100 km (62 mi) north north east of the wreck site, include the burials on 9 September 1848 at St Oswald's Church of three people annotated as: "found dead on the shore, supposed to have been passengers in the immigrant ship the Ocean Monarch from Liverpool destroyed by fire in its passage to America Aug 24 1848". They are described as two unknown females aged "apparently between 40 and 50" and "apparently between 30 and 40" and a male child aged "apparently between 2 and 3".

== See also ==
- List of shipwrecks
- List of United Kingdom disasters by death toll
