= Van der Schuyt, Van den Boom en Stanfries NV =

Dutch transport company

Van der Schuyt, Van den Boom en Stanfries NV, or S.B.S. NV was a Dutch transport company. It was founded in 1948 in a period of change, when shipping companies were becoming trucking companies. It was a merger of three of the biggest inland shipping companies, originally offering scheduled and combined services for passengers, livestock and freight:

- N.V. Reederij Van der Schuyt
- N.V. Gebrs. Van den Boom's Stoombootreederij
- Reederij Stanfries

== Background ==
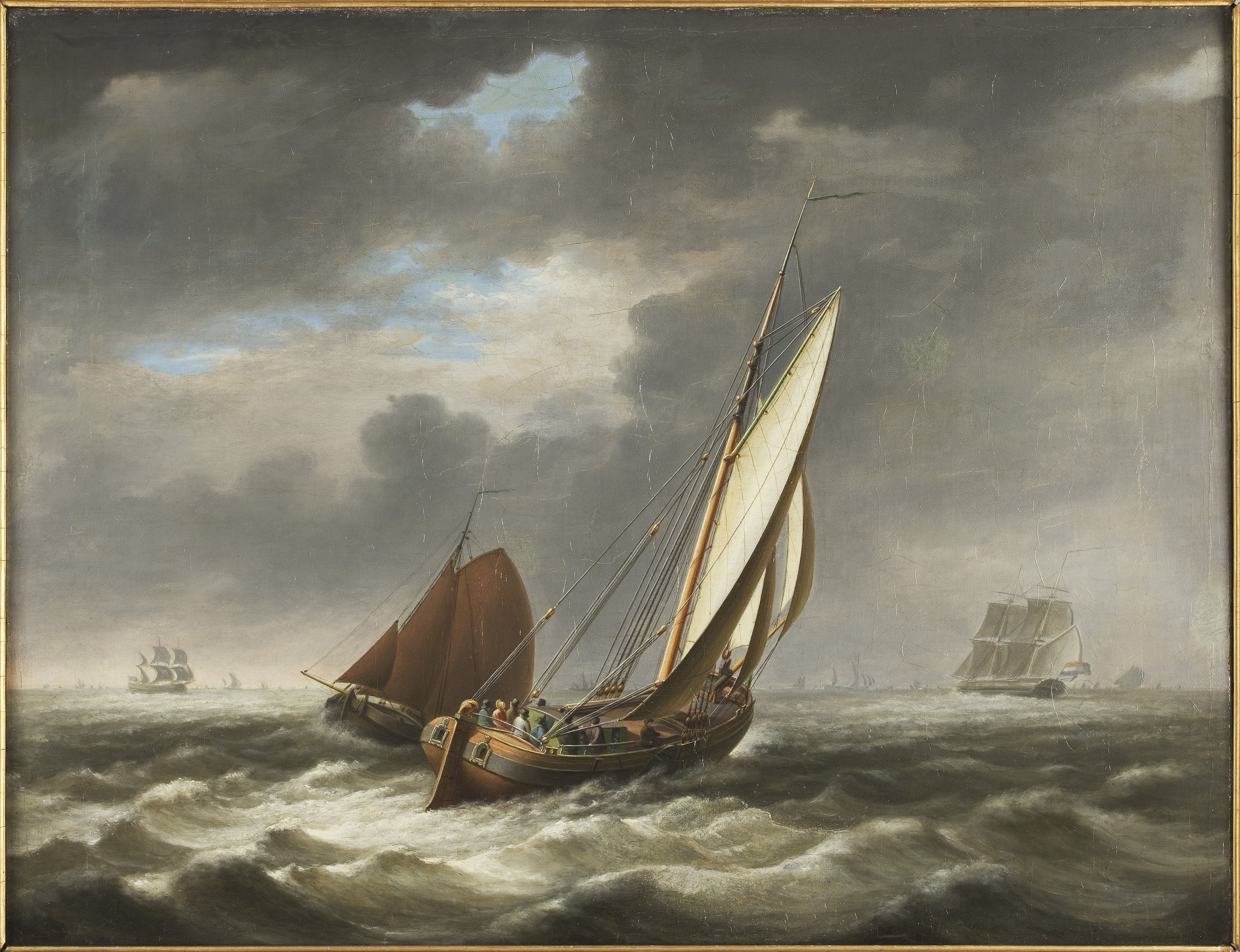
Early 19th-century painting of a beurtvaart ship en route between Amsterdam and Lemmer

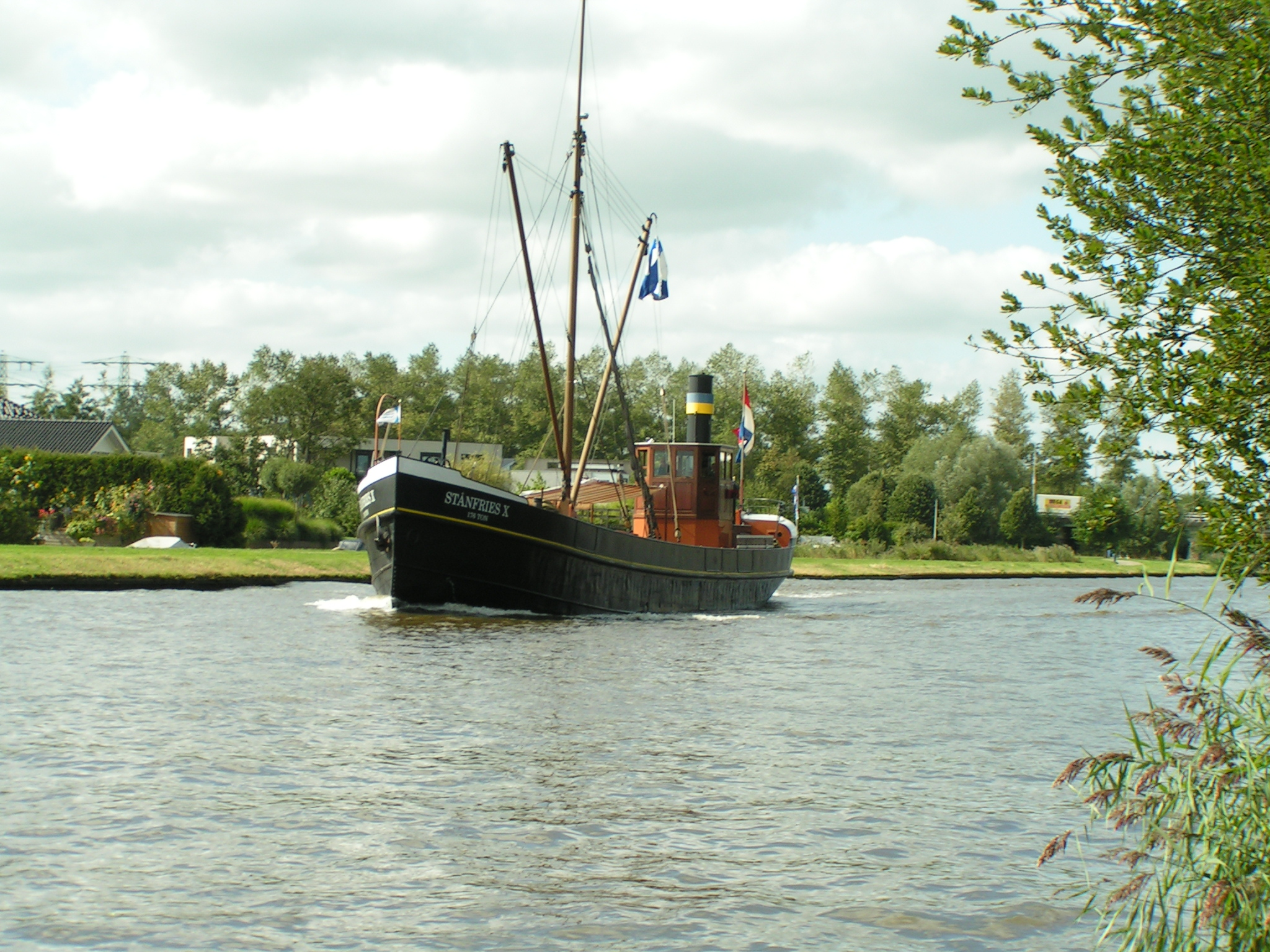
The 1912 ship Stanfries X, restored in 2002

The Netherlands are a country particularly rich in waterways. Next to many natural ones, a fair number of canals have been dug over the centuries. Between 1632 and 1665 alone, in the heyday of the Dutch Golden Age, 658 km of canal was constructed by cities and investors. Also, the Zuiderzee, a large body of water in the middle of the northern part of the country, was a major interchange for shipping. Roads on the other hand, were of poor quality if they existed at all. A road network of some significance wasn't built until the early 19th century.

The scheduled services of the beurtvaart arose in the late 15th century and became both regulated and protected by local authorities in the 16th. It grew into an extensive and reliable network, spanning the nation and abroad. The beurtvaart carried passengers, livestock and freight, the latter break bulk cargo only, and sometimes it took the mail as well. In the course of the 19th century authorities withdrew from intervening in the transport sector. Meanwhile, the steam engine came to the shipping industry and ships would be constructed of iron and steel rather than wood. In this period of changes a great number of (smaller) shipping companies sprang up. They called themselves beurtvaart companies and offered combined and scheduled transportation for travellers, livestock and cargo. Most of them did well, especially between roughly 1865 and 1895.

In the course of the first half of the 20th century the shipping companies faced growing competition from the railways and especially the truck. Owning and operating a truck is a lot cheaper than a steam (later motor) vessel. Also, ships need additional last mile transportation, which a truck does by itself. The competitive edge of the truck became painfully clear during the Great Depression of the 1930s. After 1933 the number of shipping companies and shipping lines were declining fast. Some of them started to offer trucking services, even in competition with their own shipping lines.

World War II was an outright disaster for the shipping companies, as ships were lost to acts of war or were claimed. Companies like Van der Schuyt lost ships, the yard and offices in the Rotterdam Blitz. Getting back in business after the war proved difficult for all inland shipping companies, impossible for some. Especially the years 1947 and 1948 saw many liquidations, mergers and some shipping lines becoming trucking companies. Because of the economic upheaval after the war and the shortage of means of transport, the ones that became trucking companies did reasonably or very well. By this time public passenger travel had moved to train and bus and the shipping companies moved livestock and cargo only - with a few exceptions.

== Van der Schuyt ==
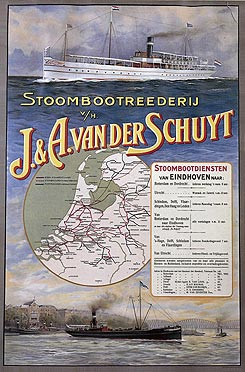
Company poster, before 1923

The shipping company Stoomboot-rederij J. & A. van der Schuyt, the family name also spelled as Van der Schuijt, was founded in 1845 by brothers Johannes (1818-1898) and Abraham (1822-1902), descendants of a Werkendam skippers family. It was based in 's-Hertogenbosch, where Johannes ran the office and operations. The company offered shipping services for livestock and cargo around 's-Hertogenbosch and to Rotterdam. Abraham moved to Rotterdam in 1862 and opened a second office there.

The company did well and expanded its number of shipping lines and services. At some point in time the company started to offer passenger services as well. Early 1875 the company was registered again, based in Rotterdam this time. In 1885 the sons of the founders joined the company and ten years later Van der Schuyt owned 9 steamers and 4 lighters. Van der Schuyt was changed into a joint-stock company in 1903 and continued to expand in the years after, especially by take-overs of competitors. The company opened a ship yard in Papendrecht in 1905. In 1917 Van der Schuyt owned 78 steamers, next to 33 lighters and tugs. By this time it was by far the largest of the shipping companies offering inland beurtvaart services. Over the next years the company changed its name a couple times an saw the founding family withdraw from management. Van der Schuyt participated financially in competitor Verschure & Co. and started to operate ferries and tourist services in the 1930s.

== Van den Boom ==
Brothers J.L. and G. Van den Boom registered the company Gebrs. Van den Boom in Rotterdam in 1857. They offered beurtvaart-like services to Helmond and Meppel with six sailing vessels. Shortly after the company started to offer services to Zutphen and Deventer. Another service was started between Amsterdam and Helmond. Next to the traditional break bulk cargo of the beurtvaart, the brothers were able to attract larger customers and they became active as shipbrokers.

In 1911 the company was changed into a joint-stock company. By this time it was one of the seven or eight biggest shipping companies offering scheduled services for passengers, cattle and cargo. In 1939 the company owned 36 steamers, motor ships and lighters.

== Stanfries ==
=== Saint-Martin and Leeuwarder ===
The Rotterdam-based trading company Saint-Martin exported flax from Friesland. In 1855 they bought two steamers for practical reasons, the Leeuwarden I and the Leeuwarden II. In 1860 the steamers started to accept freight from others, effectively becoming a 'beurtvaart' service between the northern provinces of the Netherlands and Rotterdam, via the transportation hub of Amsterdam. The company expanded, took over a competitor and bought several more ships.

Between Friesland and Amsterdam several traditionally sailing beurtvaart ships were active, next to some newly raised steam ship companies like the Friesch-Noord-Hollandsche Stoombootmaatschappij. On open water like the Zuiderzee the speed advantage of steamers over sailing vessels was limited. However, in 1898 eight 'beurtvaart' skippers founded the Leeuwarder Stoomboot Maatschappij in order to buy and operate steamers of their own. They bought two steamers of 120 ton each. After 13 years of fierce competition the two companies merged in 1911 into the Nieuwe Leeuwarder Stoomboot Maatschappij, owning some nine ships.

=== Holland-Friesland, Stanfries ===
In 1912 Saint-Martin and the Nieuwe Leeuwarder merged. The new company was named Scheepvaartmaatschappij Holland-Friesland and it owned 25 ships, making it one of the largest of the country. In 1924 company management was handed over to Petrus Verschure of Verschure & Co., who had built up large participations in the company. Because of confusion with one of Verschure's services, the Holland-Friesland Line, in 1933 the company was renamed into N.V. Reederij Stanfries. By this time the company owned 19 steamers, 7 motor vessels and 7 lighters.

Van der Schuyt had built up large participations in Verschure's companies, especially Stanfries, effectively becoming its owner in 1937. Verschure left the management of Stanfries and E. Saint-Martin took over the position, on behalf of Van der Schuyt.

== The merger ==
In 1946 Van der Schuyt and Van den Boom decided tot cooperate and in 1948 the two companies fully merged, also involving Reederij Stanfries. The company was based in Rotterdam and had a share capital of 1.5 million Dutch guilder. S.B.S. invested heavily in motorising its fleet, almost completing that by 1955. That year the company owned 44 motor ships, next to 5 steamers scheduled for a refit and 19 smaller vessels.

S.B.S. also invested in road transportation, owning 34 trucks with 25 trailers by 1955. In had a new head office built in Rotterdam in 1954. The company operated several ferries across rivers and was active in tourist travel.

== The sixties and after ==
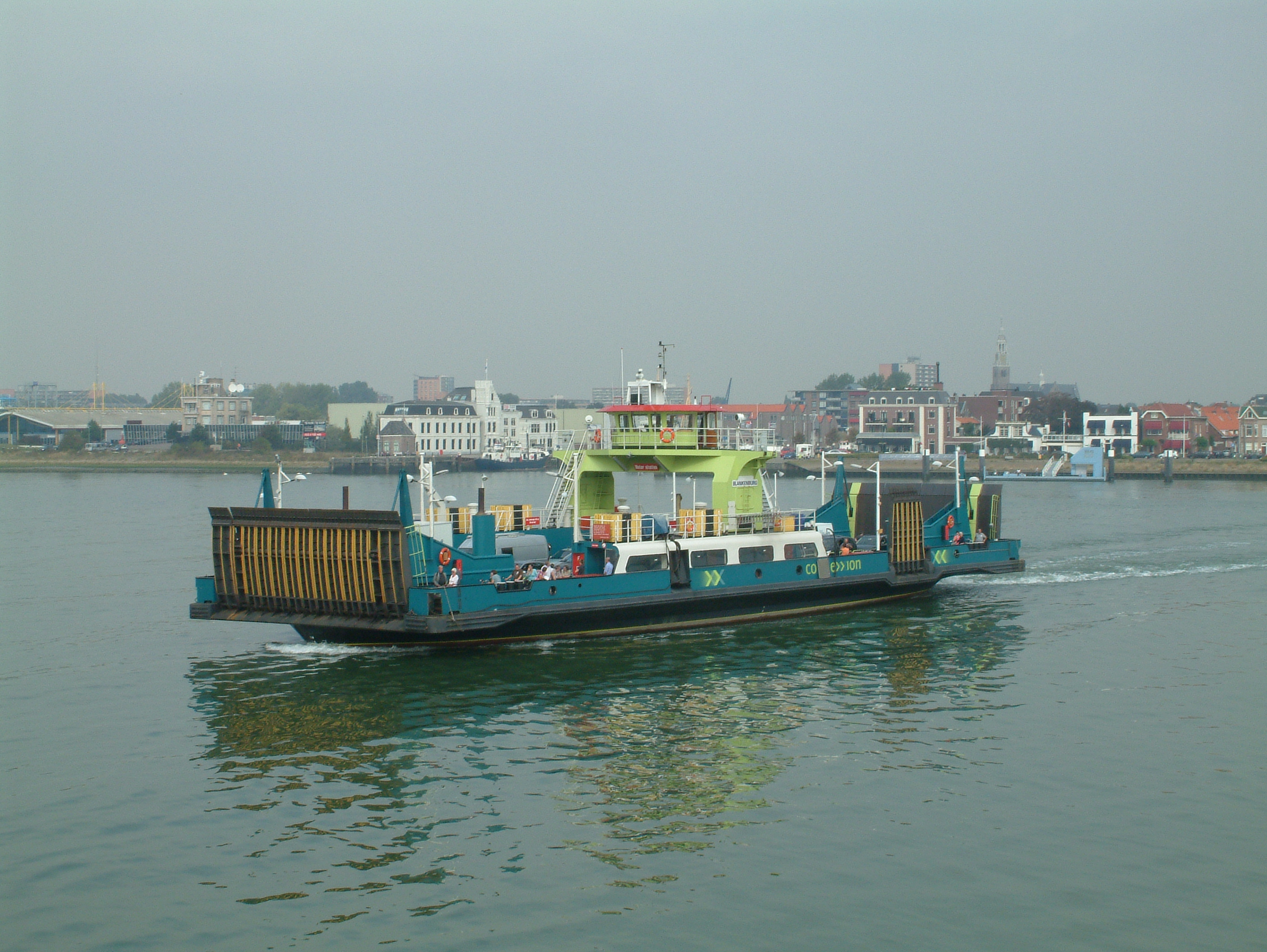
The Blankenburg ferry, in Connexxion colours

In the 1960s the company switched to road transport entirely, ending its scheduled services by boat in 1963, with the exception of a few ferries. It became a trucking company in the modern sense, owned by Damco Scheepvaart, which was acquired by Nedlloyd in 1977. The company was renamed into SBS wegtransport. Its ferries were taken over by the Dutch province of South Holland (in 2000) and by Connexxion (in 2007).

== See also ==
- Alkmaar Packet

== Sources ==
- (in Dutch) Fuchs, J.M. (1955); De beurt is aan, memorial book for 100 years Van Swieten shipping; Wormerveer.
- (in Dutch) Filarski, R. (2014); Tegen de stroom in. Binnenvaart en vaarwegen vanaf 1800, Utrecht. ISBN 9789053454770
- (in Dutch) Brouwer, P., Van Kesteren, G. and Wiersma, A. (2008); Berigt aan de heeren reizigers; 400 jaar openbaar vervoer in Nederland - Chapter 11: "Hoogtij van de stoomboot", The Hague, SDU publishers. Chapter 11 retrieved online 21 September 2015.
