= Royal TESO =

Ferry service company in the Netherlands

Texels Eigen Stoomboot Onderneming
- Industry: Shipping
- Predecessor: Nieuwe Texelsche Stoombootdienst
- Founded: 1907
- Headquarters: Den Hoorn, Netherlands
- Area served: North Sea
- Services: Passenger transportation Freight transportation
- Website: www.teso.nl

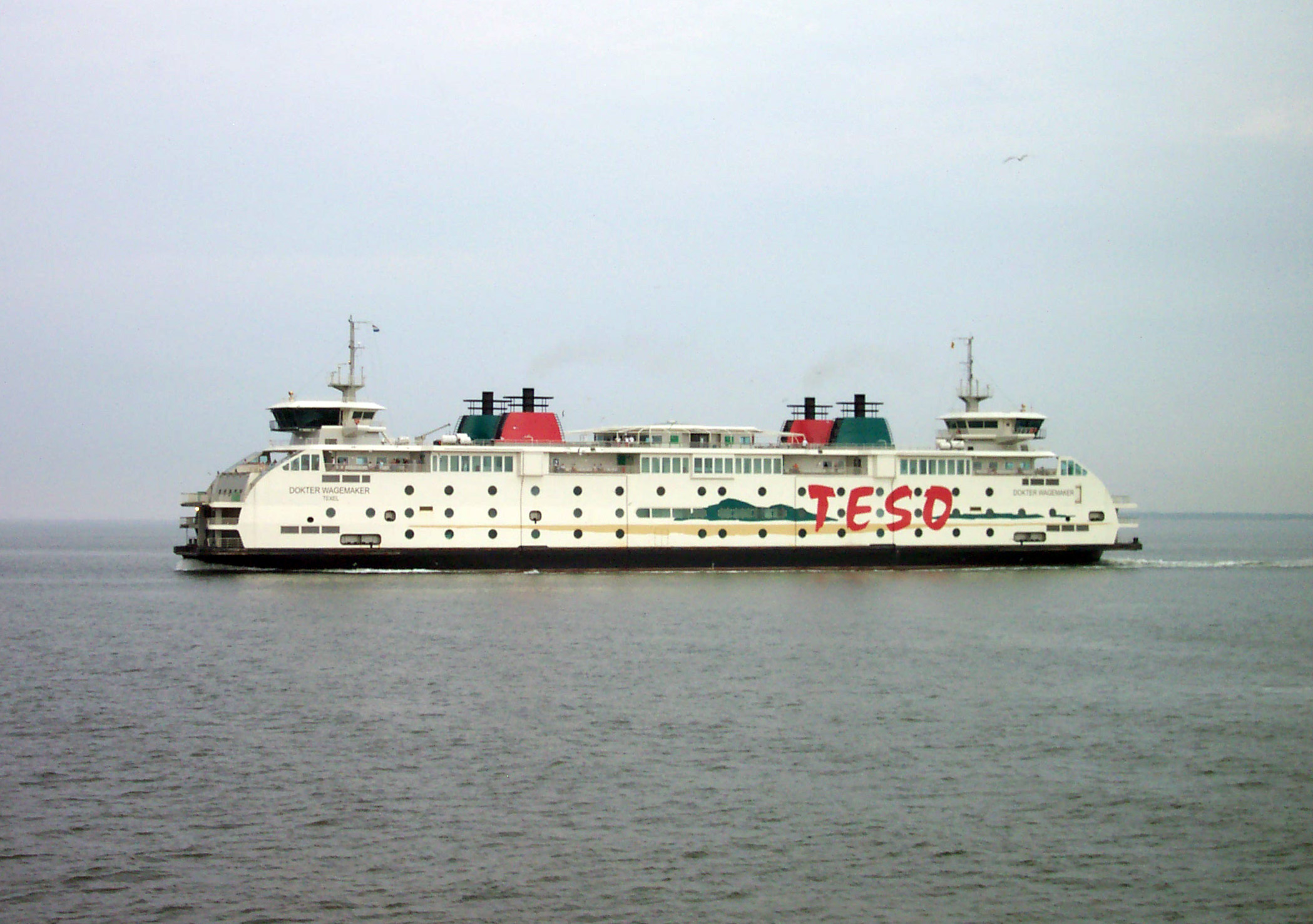
TESO's Dokter Wagemaker

The Royal TESO N.V. is a private ferry company operating the only public boat service to and from the Dutch Wadden island of Texel. TESO stands for Texels Eigen Stoomboot Onderneming (in English: Texel's Own Steamboat Company).

== History ==
Inhabitants of the island were dissatisfied with price and quality of the ferry service, as operated by the company Alkmaar Packet since 1882. In 1907 some of them formed an association, led by local physician Adriaan Wagemaker, to operate a (hired) ferry of their own. In 1908 the association was changed into a public company and islanders raised 75.000 guilders to build its first ship, which went into service in August that year. A nearly complete boycott of the services of Alkmaar Packet by the locals made that company withdraw in 1909.

3650 privately traded shares are held by 3100 shareholders, mostly residents of Texel. In 2007, TESO celebrated its centennial anniversary, and therefore was conferred the 'Royal' designation on Texel by Queen Beatrix.

== Fleet ==
Currently, the TESO operates a fleet of two ships, both able to carry 1750 passengers and up to 300 cars. They cross the Marsdiep, a deep-tide race between Den Helder and Texel in about 20 minutes.

Ship	Years of service	Capacity
Texelstroom	2016–present	1,750 passengers, 350 cars
Dokter Wagemaker	2005–present (Note: In reserve since 2016)	1,750 passengers, 320 cars
Schulpengat	1990–2018	1,750 passengers, 242 cars
Molengat	1980–2006	1,200 passengers, 190 cars
Texelstroom	1966–1991	750 passengers, 70 cars
Marsdiep	1964–1991	750 passengers, 70 cars
Koningin Wilhelmina	1960–1967	750 passengers, 40 cars
De Dageraad	1955–1965	1,000 passengers, 25 cars
Dokter Wagemaker	1952–1963	1,000 passengers, 16 cars
Zeemeeuw	1947–1965	90 passengers
Voorwaarts	1940–1967	300 passengers
Dokter Wagemaker	1934–1952	1,000 passengers, 8 cars
Marsdiep	1926–1956	600 passengers, 4 cars
Ada van Holland	1909–1922	200 passengers
De Dageraad	1908–1934	450 passengers, 2 cars
