= Alkmaar Packet =

Dutch shipping company (1864–1950)

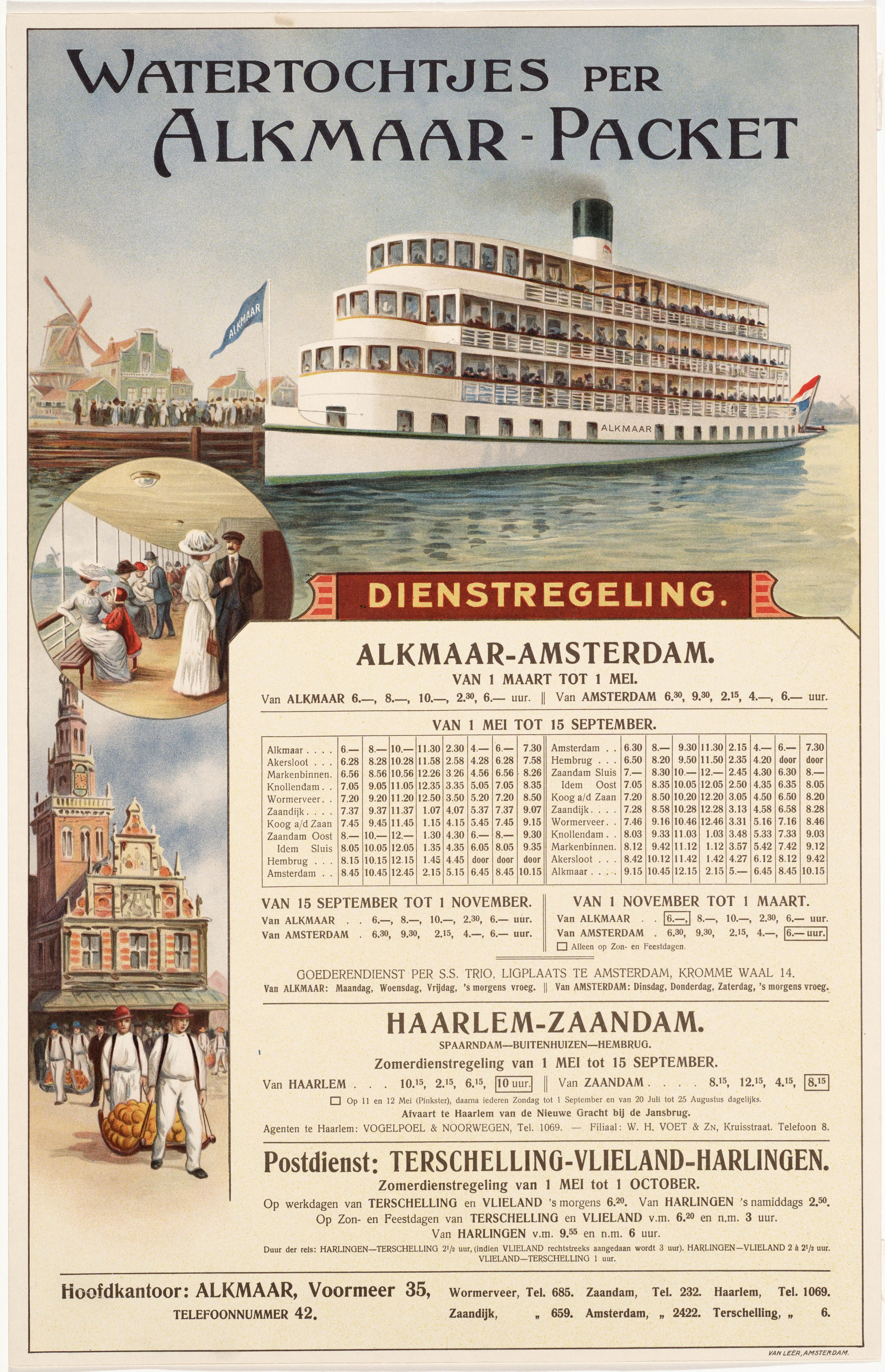
Company poster and schedule, 1913

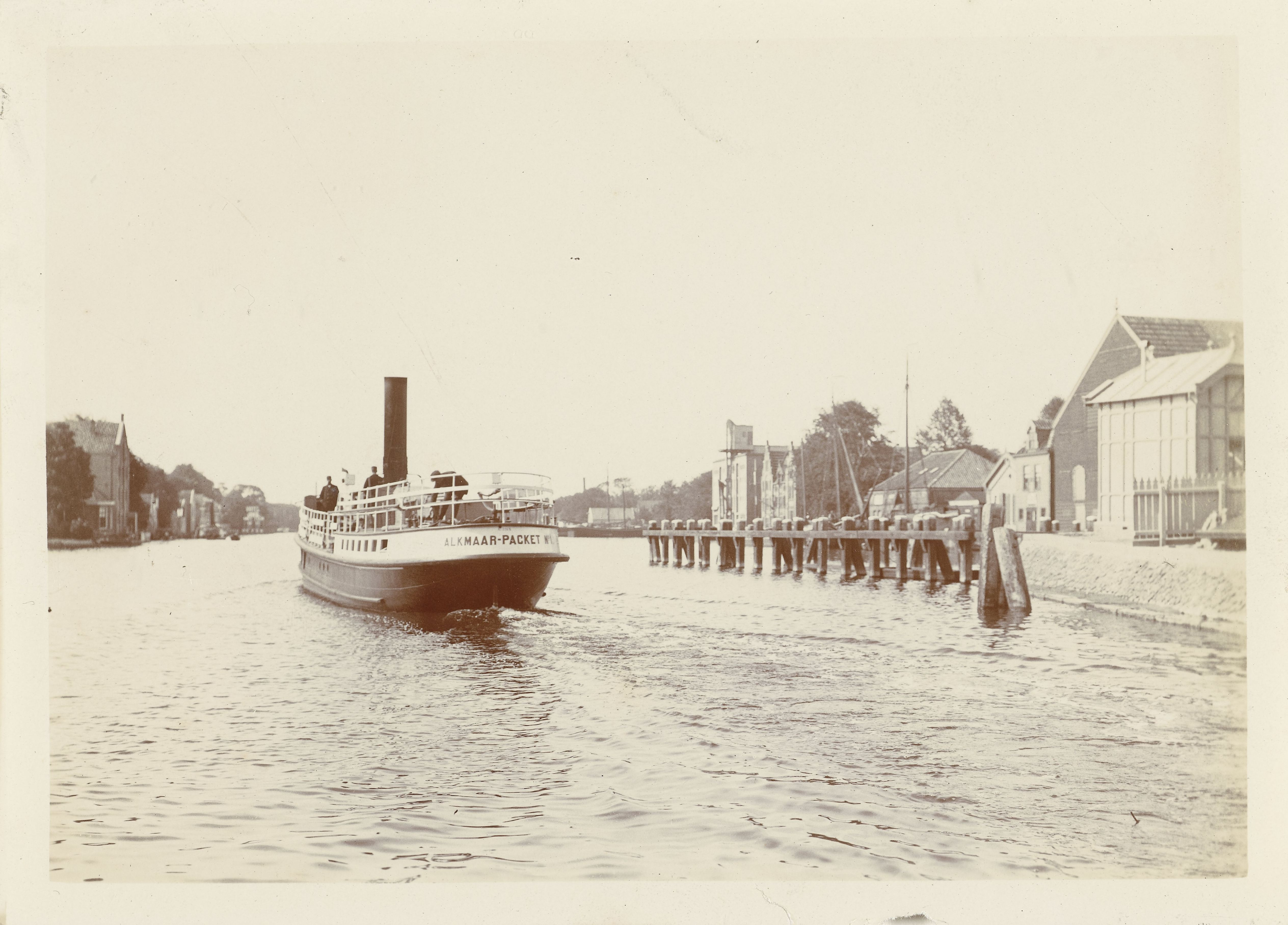
The Alkmaar Packet 1 on the Zaan river, 1904

Alkmaar Packet was a shipping company that operated scheduled passenger and freight services in the northern part of the Netherlands between 1864 and 1950. The services the company provided were a kind of beurtvaart, which at the time had become a forerunner of modern public transport. At its height Alkmaar Packet owned more than 20 ships.

== Early years ==
In 1864 Cornelis Bosman (1830-1911) established the company as a limited partnership and it was located in Alkmaar in the Dutch province of North Holland. Operations started 1 July 1864, with the steamer Alkmaar Packet 1 sailing over the Noordhollandsch Kanaal between Alkmaar and Zaandam. In between the ship stopped at Akersloot, Markenbinnen, Oostknollendam, Wormerveer and Koog aan de Zaan. Passengers travelling onwards to Amsterdam had to change ship in Zaandam as the Alkmaar Packet 1 was not seaworthy and the IJ was connected to the still open Zuiderzee. Later ships could sail on to the capital, making a trip from Alkmaar to Amsterdam in just under three hours.

== Expansion ==
Alkmaar Packet did well, and soon expanded its services with more ships and extra departures on the main route. It introduced new lines, like Zaandam - Haarlem and Zwolle - Kampen - Amsterdam. In 1882 it was granted the license for the ferry connecting the island of Texel with the mainland. In 1886 it was chosen to operate the ferry between the cities (and railway stations) of Enkhuizen and Stavoren, which it continued to do until 1938.

In the twentieth century passenger transport grew rapidly with river cruises and day trippers, like inhabitants of Amsterdam going to the Zaandam fair. Alkmaar Packet was also the mode of transport for many school trips, with Zaandam children visiting Artis, the Amsterdam Zoo. The locks at Zaandam, a bottleneck for decades, were replaced with the much larger Wilhelminasluis in 1903.

In the 1910s Alkmaar Packet ordered the construction of much larger saloon ships than previously in use. Also, they weren't steamers but the company's first motor vessels. The Alkmaar of 1912 could carry up to 1300 passengers on three decks.

== Competition ==
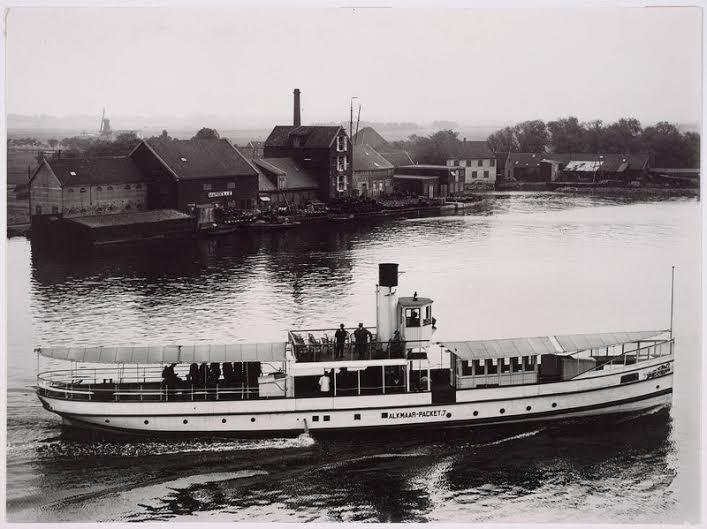
The Alkmaar Packet 7 on the river Zaan, around 1915

While the company had a virtual monopoly on some lines, it faced fierce competition on others, mainly by other shipping companies operating (inland) steam liners. In 1902 some locals of the Zaan area established the Zaandamsche Stoomvaart Maatschappij because they were dissatisfied with price and performance of Alkmaar Packet. Later that year the Zaandamsche joined six other shipping companies to form Verschure & Co., which became a major competitor of AP, operating in mostly the same part of the Netherlands. The two shipping companies started a tariff war on AP's traditional route, which would last more than two decades.

In 1907 islanders of Texel, also dissatisfied with Alkmaar Packet, established an association which the next year became the Royal TESO. A virtually complete boycott by the locals, in favour of the TESO ship, made Alkmaar Packet withdraw from the Texel ferry service in 1909.

== Decline ==
The first half of the twentieth century meant a decline for most of the inland (steam) shipping companies. An ever expanding and improving road network with buses and trucks on it defeated the steamers on their two strong points: intricacy and cost. The first World War was bad for inland shipping, the great depression even worse, but the second World War outright disastrous. Materiel was claimed or lost to acts of war and large exclusion zones meant a lot less demand for transport. After the war some companies struggled to survive, some joined with others or became trucking companies or both. Alkmaar Packet was one that never quite recovered. It terminated freight transport in 1948 and was disbanded in 1950.

== Sources ==
- (in Dutch) Brouwer, P., Van Kesteren, G. and Wiersma, A. (2008); Berigt aan de heeren reizigers; 400 jaar openbaar vervoer in Nederland - Chapter 11: "Hoogtij van de stoomboot", The Hague, SDU publishers. Chapter 11 retrieved online 20 September 2015.
