= Markenbinnen =

- Village
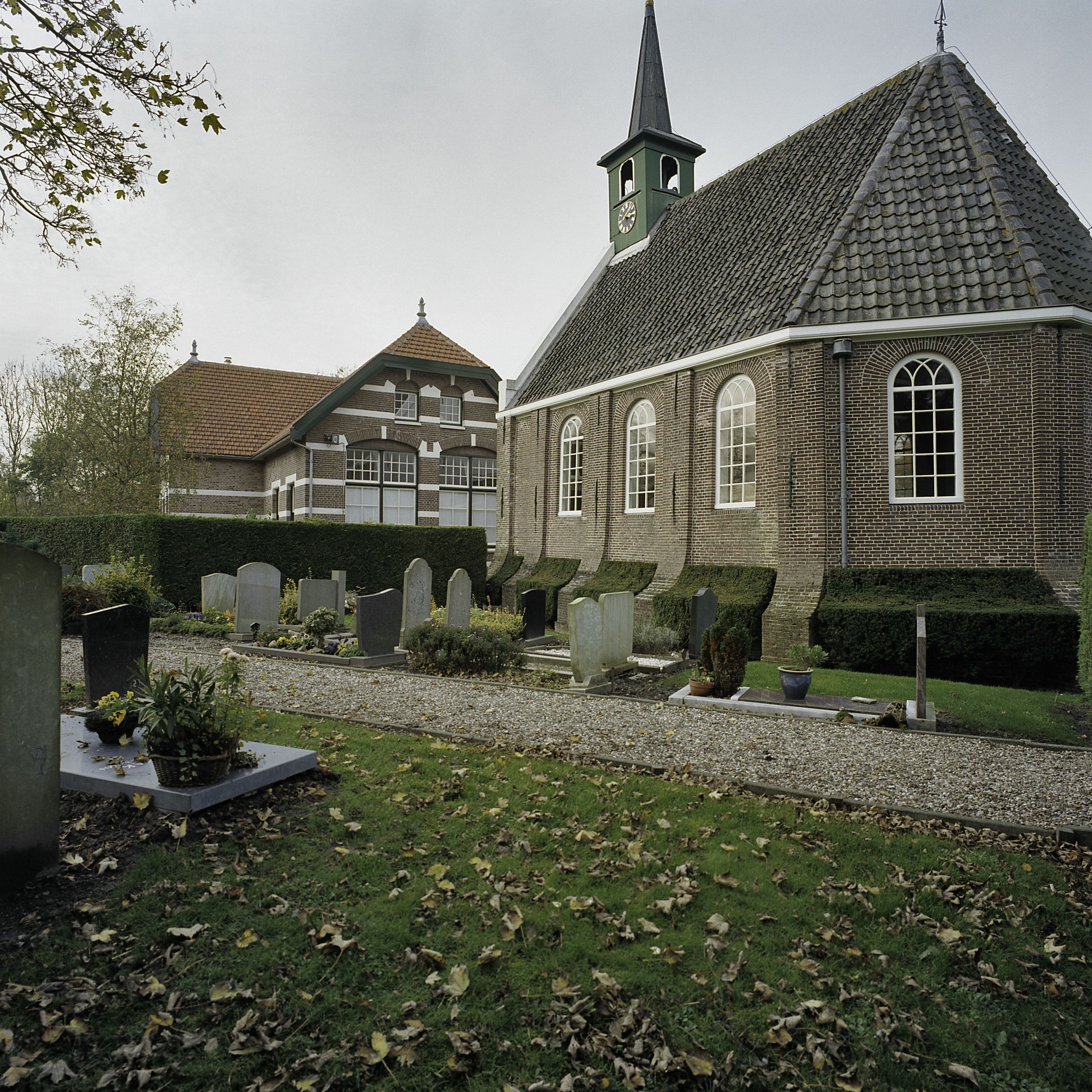
- Dutch Reformed church of Markenbinnen

- Location in the Netherlands Location in the province of North Holland in the Netherlands
- Coordinates: 52°32′N 4°47′E
- Country: Netherlands
- Province: North Holland
- Municipality: Alkmaar

Area
  - Total: 1.46 km^{2} (0.56 sq mi)
- Elevation: −0.8 m (−2.6 ft)

Population (2021)
  - Total: 325
  - Density: 223/km^{2} (577/sq mi)
- Time zone: UTC+1 (CET)
  - Summer (DST): UTC+2 (CEST)
- Postal code: 1536
- Dialing code: 075

Markenbinnen is a village in the Dutch province of North Holland. It is a part of the municipality of Alkmaar, and lies about 10 km north of Zaandam.

The village was first mentioned in 1395 or 1396 as Marken, and means "border line". It was earlier located on a little island. "Binnen" (inside) has been added to distinguish from Marken. Markenbinnen developed in the Late Middle Ages as a peat excavation settlement. Around 1644, the Markervaart was dug separating the Markerpolder from the Oostwouderpolder.

The Dutch Reformed church is an aisleless church with wooden tower built 1704 as a replacement for its medieval predecessor. Markenbinnen was home to 183 people in 1840.

The Fort Marken-Binnen was constructed as part of the Stelling van Amsterdam and was completed in 1905. It was used during World War I and II as barracks, but became military obsolete after the World War II.

== Gallery ==
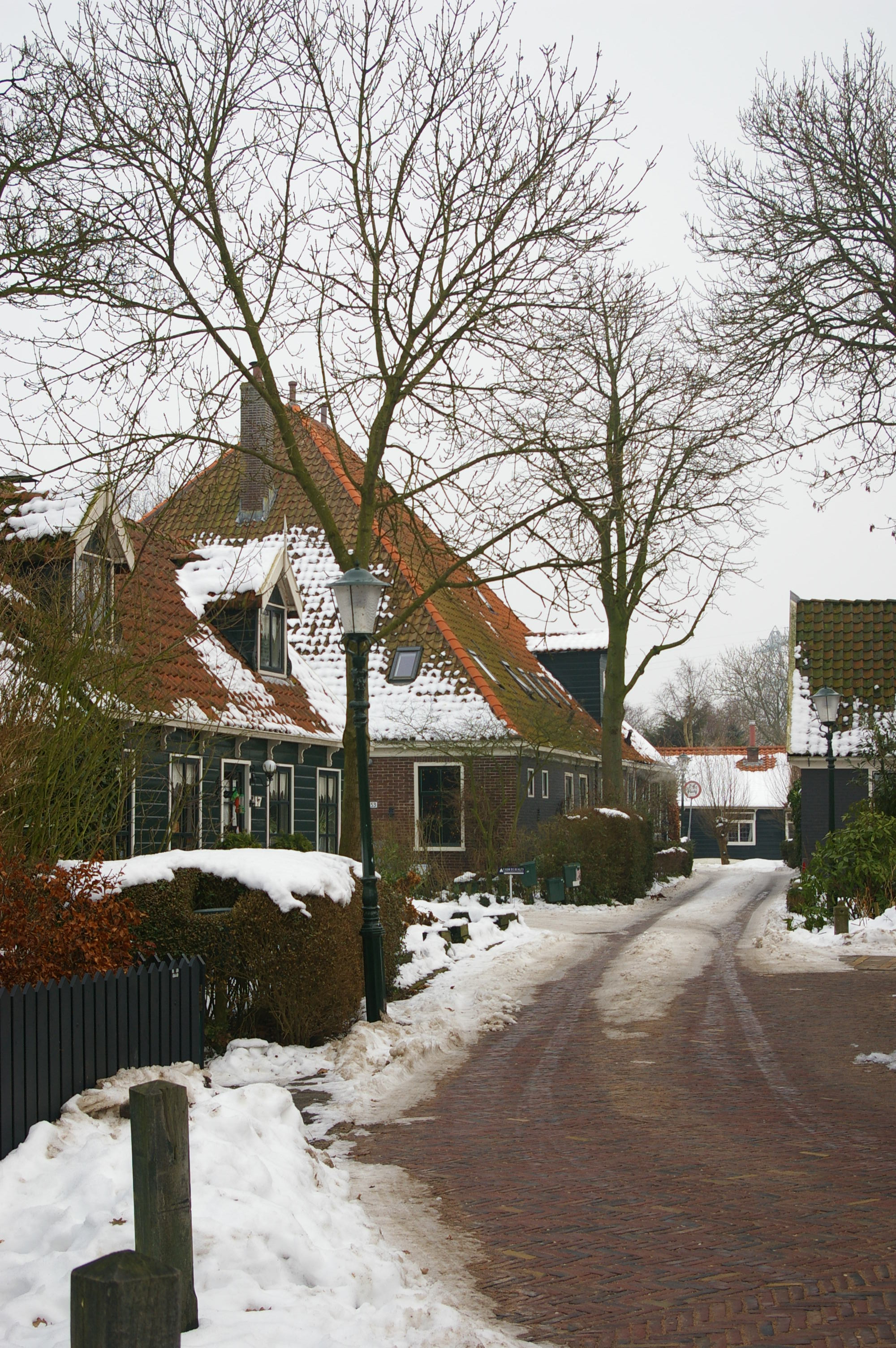
Village street in winter

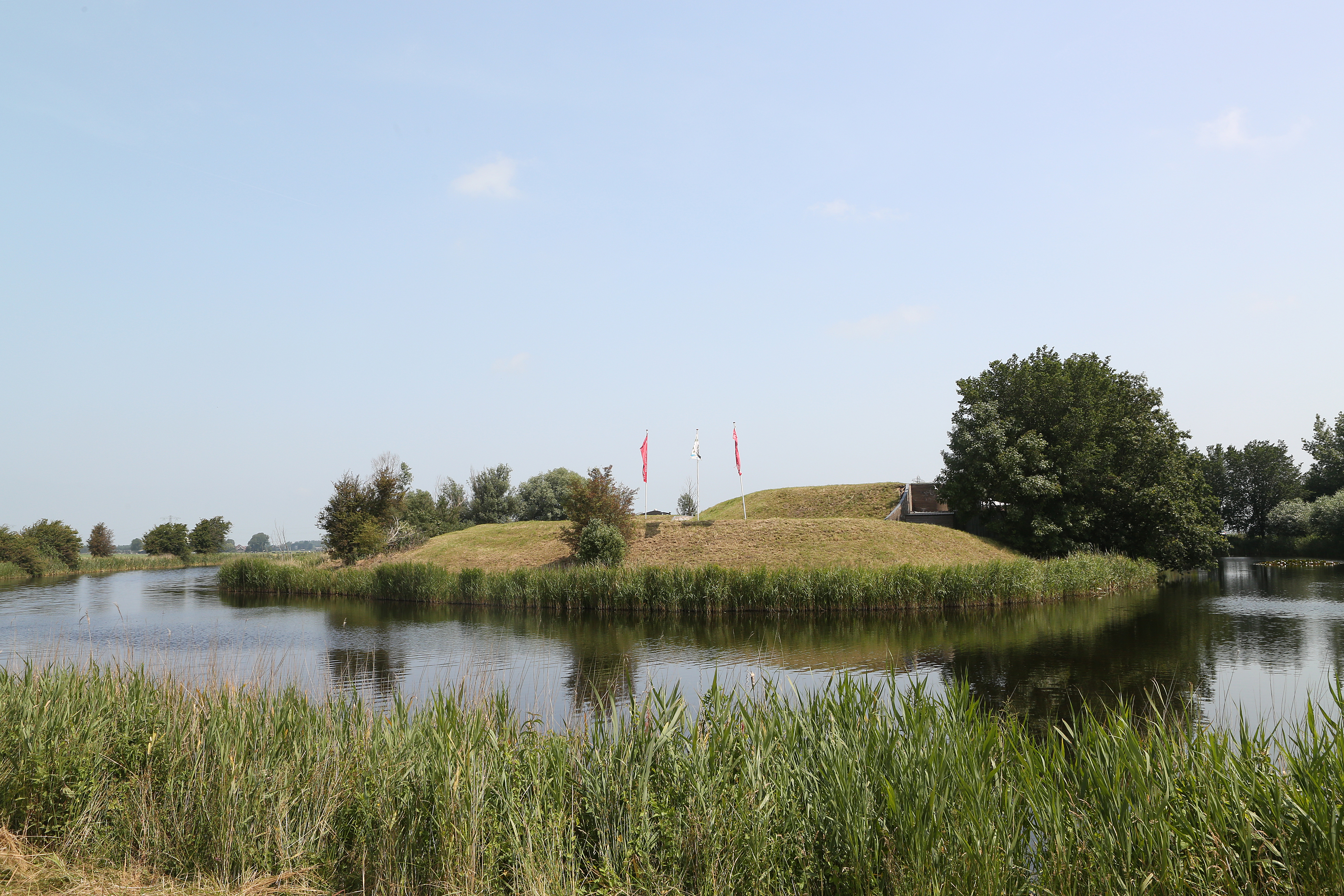
Fort Marken-Binnen

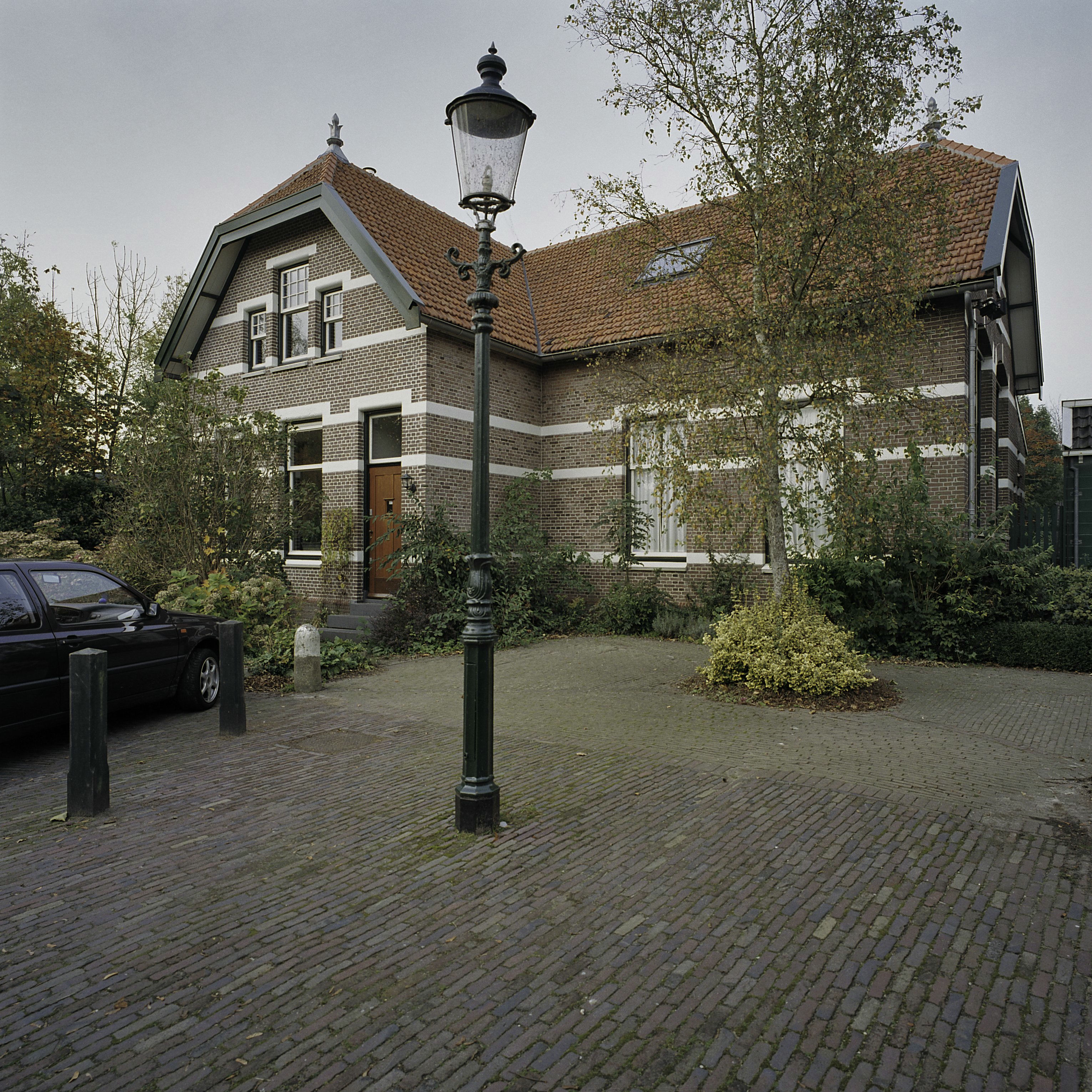
Teacher's house
